= Joseph LaPalombara =

American political scientist (1925–2026)

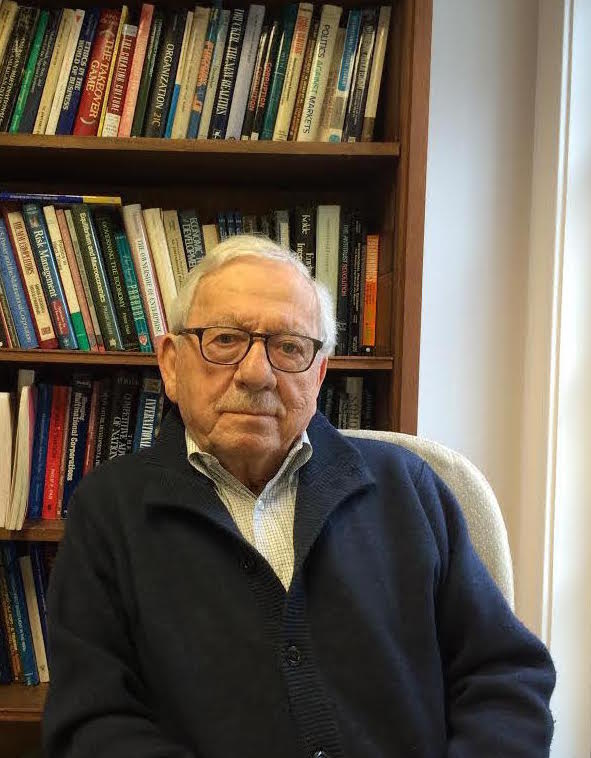
- LaPalombara in 2015
- Born: May 18, 1925; Chicago, Illinois, U.S.
- Died: June 12, 2026 (aged 101); Hamden, Connecticut, U.S.
- Education: Princeton University (A.M. 1952, Ph.D. 1954); University of Illinois (B.A. 1947, A.M. 1950)
- Scientific career
- Fields: Comparative politics; Italian politics; Interest-group theory; International management; Multinational corporations
- Institutions: Yale University (Arnold Wolfers Professor of Political Science and Management, 1968–2001); Michigan State University; Oregon State University; University of Bergamo (visiting); LUISS, Rome (visiting); Columbia University (visiting); University of California, Berkeley (visiting); University of Florence (visiting)

Joseph LaPalombara (May 18, 1925 – June 12, 2026) was an American political scientist who specialized in comparative politics, interest-group theory, and the foreign investments made by global firms. He was the Arnold Wolfers Professor Emeritus of Political Science and Management at Yale University, where he taught for more than fifty years. LaPalombara twice chaired the political science department at Yale and directed its Institution for Social and Policy Studies. Before joining Yale in 1964, he taught for three years at Oregon State University and eleven years at Michigan State University, where he chaired the political science department. He was widely regarded as the leading American scholar of Italian politics, and his books included the textbook Politics Within Nations (1974) and Democracy, Italian Style (1987).

For his scholarship on Italy, LaPalombara was made a Knight and later a Knight Commander of the Order of Merit of the Italian Republic. He was a vice-president of the American Political Science Association, president of the Conference Group for the Study of Italian Politics and Society, and a member of the American Academy of Arts and Sciences.

== Early life and education ==
The son of Italian immigrants Luigi LaPalombara and Helen Teutonico, LaPalombara grew up in Chicago's Near West Side during the Great Depression. He left high school at the age of sixteen and worked in a variety of industrial plants, learning specialized trades that included the heat treatment of steel, and held defense-industry jobs during World War II.

A wartime admissions program allowed LaPalombara to enroll at the University of Illinois, from which he graduated with highest honors in 1947; he was elected to Phi Beta Kappa and served as president of both the Student Senate and his senior class. He taught briefly at Oregon State University and was a teaching assistant at Princeton University, where he earned a Ph.D. in political science in 1954. He held a Fulbright scholarship in Italy in 1957–1958.

== Career ==
LaPalombara's career combined teaching, research, consulting and diplomacy. In the United States he held visiting professorships at the University of California, Berkeley and Columbia University, and in Italy at the universities of Florence, Catania and Bergamo and at the Free International University of Social Studies (LUISS) in Rome.

Early in his career LaPalombara consulted for government agencies, including the Foreign Service Institute, the Agency for International Development and the Central Intelligence Agency, and for the Ford and Rockefeller foundations and the Social Science Research Council. He later moved into corporate consulting, beginning as a senior adviser to the National Industrial Conference Board of New York. He advised U.S. firms including IBM, General Electric, ExxonMobil, Union Carbide, Alcoa and Praxair, and European companies including ICI, Ciba-Geigy, Fiat, Montedison and ENI, and became a founder and first president of the New York consultancy Multinational Strategies, Inc.

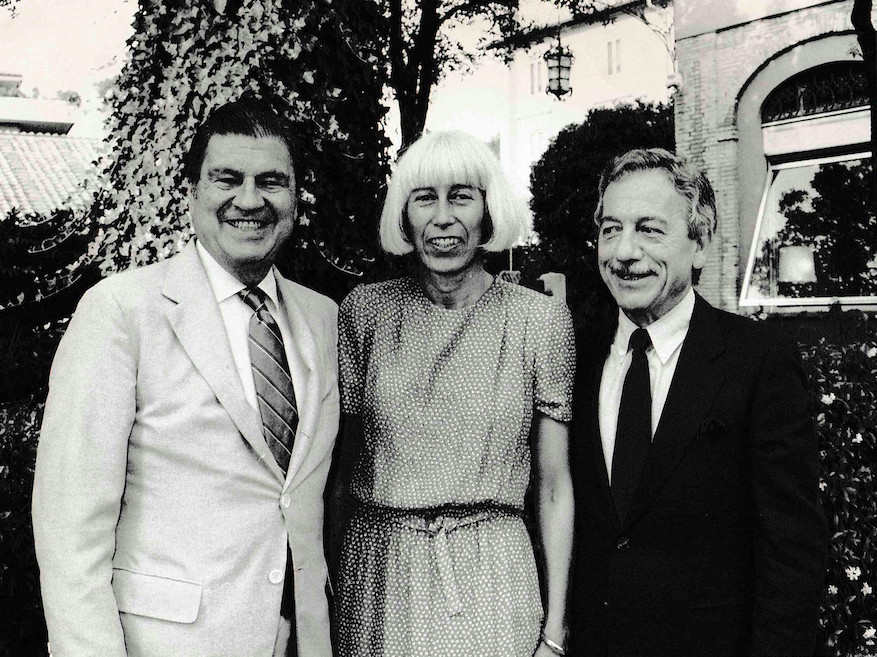
LaPalombara (left) with his wife and Maxwell M. Rabb, United States Ambassador to Italy, at the U.S. Embassy in Rome, 1981

In diplomacy, LaPalombara served in 1980–1981 as First Secretary in charge of the cultural section of the U.S. Embassy in Rome. At Yale, LaPalombara twice chaired the Department of Political Science and served a term as director of the Institution for Social and Policy Studies. He was also among the faculty who helped establish the Yale School of Management in the 1970s and taught there for several years. After his retirement from Yale in 2001, he continued to teach one undergraduate seminar each year, on the overseas investments of global firms.

== Scholarship and research ==
LaPalombara was a leading figure in comparative politics and, for many years, a member of the Social Science Research Council's Committee on Comparative Politics, part of a mid-20th-century movement that pushed the comparative study of political systems in a more empirical direction. His textbook Politics Within Nations (1974) applied that approach to the politics of many countries.

Much of his work concerned interest-group theory and its application inside and outside the United States. His 1960 article in The Journal of Politics, "The Utility and Limitations of Interest Group Theory in Non-American Field Situations", examined the theory beyond the American context—a subject he revisited in a 2017 article in the Rivista Italiana di Politiche Pubbliche.

LaPalombara was widely regarded as the leading American scholar of Italian politics; the political scientist Robert D. Putnam called him "the dean of the study of Italian politics in America". His Democracy, Italian Style (Yale University Press, 1987) was among his best-known works. For Prentice Hall he edited a series of short books on comparative politics whose contributors included Robert D. Putnam, Jean Blondel and James C. Scott.

In his later work LaPalombara turned to the role of multinational corporations in the international economy and in the development of less-developed countries. He co-authored several studies with Stephen Blank for the National Industrial Conference Board on the problems created by foreign direct investment. He wrote or co-edited more than a dozen books and published numerous journal articles and book chapters. He served on the editorial board of The Yale Review and as an editor of the Journal of International Business Education, and was a founding member of the Italian Social Science Council (CSS).

== Journalism ==
LaPalombara also worked in journalism to reach a wider audience. For many years he was editor-in-chief of the magazine Italy Italy and a columnist for the Italian-American daily La Voce di New York.

== Honors and accolades ==
LaPalombara was named a Knight of the Order of Merit of the Italian Republic during his first year at Yale, in 1964, and was elevated to Commendatore (Knight Commander) ten years later. He also received medals from the Italian Senate and Constitutional Court, and Yale's DeVane Medal for teaching and scholarship.

LaPalombara received a Guggenheim Fellowship in 1971, and held fellowships from the Fulbright Program, the Center for Advanced Study in the Behavioral Sciences and the Ford, Rockefeller and Twentieth Century funds and foundations. He was a member of the Council on Foreign Relations and the Connecticut Academy of Arts and Sciences, served on the National Committee on American Foreign Policy and the Board of Trustees of the American Academy in Rome, and chaired the SSRC's Foreign Area Fellowship Program. He was president of Reset Dialogues U.S.A. and served on the board of the Center for American Studies in Rome.

== Personal life and death ==
LaPalombara was married twice; his first wife was Lyda, and his second wife, Constance, predeceased him in 2023. He died at the Whitney Center in Hamden, Connecticut, on June 12, 2026, at the age of 101.

== Selected publications ==
=== Books ===
- The Initiative and Referendum in Oregon, 1938–1948. Oregon State College. 1950.
- The Italian Labor Movement: Problems and Prospects. Cornell University Press. 1957.
- Interest Groups in Italian Politics. Princeton University Press. 1964.
- Joseph LaPalombara; Myron Weiner (1966). Political Parties and Political Development. Princeton University Press.
- Italy: The Politics of Planning. Syracuse University Press. 1966.
- Leonard Binder; James S. Coleman; Joseph LaPalombara; Lucian Pye; Sidney Verba; Myron Weiner (1971). Crises and Sequences in Political Development. Princeton University Press.
- Politics Within Nations. Prentice-Hall. 1974. ISBN 0136878148.
- Multinational Corporations and National Elites: A Study in Tensions. The Conference Board. 1976. ISBN 0823701360.
- Multinational Corporations in Comparative Perspective. The Conference Board. 1977. ISBN 082370159X.
- Multinational Corporations and Developing Countries. The Conference Board. 1979. ISBN 0823702030.
- A Política no Interior das Nações [Politics Within Nations] (in Portuguese). Universidade de Brasília. 1982.
- Democracy, Italian Style. Yale University Press. 1987. ISBN 0300039131.
- LaPalombara, Joseph (2009). Stati uniti? Italia e USA a confronto (in Italian). Rubbettino.

=== Articles and chapters ===
- "Political Party Systems and Crisis Governments", Midwest Journal of Political Science, Vol. 2 (May 1958).
- "Conceptual and Operational Shortcomings of the Political Elite Model", in Political Sociology, Fourth World Congress of Sociology Proceedings, Associazione Italiana di Scienze Sociali, 1959.
- LaPalombara, Joseph (1960). "The Utility and Limitations of Interest Group Theory in Non-American Field Situations". The Journal of Politics. 22 (1): 29–49. doi:10.2307/2126587. JSTOR 2126587. S2CID 144457905.
- "The Comparative Roles of Groups in Political Systems", SSRC Items, Vol. 15 (June 1969).
- "Italy: Fragmentation, Isolation and Alienation", in L. Pye and S. Verba (eds.), Political Culture and Political Development (Princeton, 1965), chapter 8.
- "Decline of Ideology: A Dissent and an Interpretation", American Political Science Review, Vol. 60 (March 1966).
- LaPalombara, Joseph (1968). "Macro-Theories and Micro-Applications in Comparative Politics: A Widening Chasm". Comparative Politics. 1 (1): 52–78. doi:10.2307/421375. JSTOR 421375.
- "Political Power and Political Development", Yale Law Journal, Vol. 78 (July 1969), pp. 1253–1275.
- "Values and Ideologies in the Administrative Evolution of Western Constitutional Systems", in R. Braibanti (ed.), Political and Administrative Development (Durham, 1969).
- "Parsimony and Empiricism in Comparative Politics: An Anti-Scholastic View", in R. Holt and J. Turner (eds.), Methodology of Comparative Political Research (New York, 1969).
- "Political Participation as an Analytical Concept in Comparative Politics", in L. Pye and S. Verba (eds.), The Citizen and Politics: A Comparative Perspective (Stamford, CT: Greylock, 1978).
- LaPalombara, Joseph (1980). "The Assessment and Evaluation of the Non-Economic Environment in American Firms". Journal of International Business Studies.
- "Political Analysis and Forecasting in the Private Sector", Vierteljahresberichte (December 1982).
- "Totalitarianism: Some Enduring Conceptual Muddles", Global Perspectives, Vol. 2 (Fall 1984).
- Dierkes, Meinolf; et al., eds. (2001). "Power and Politics in Organizations: Public and Private Sector Comparisons". Handbook of Organizational Learning and Knowledge. Oxford University Press.
- "Anti-Americanism in Europe: Corporate and National Dimensions", American Foreign Policy Interests, Vol. 26 (August 2004).
- LaPalombara, Joseph (2007). "Reflections on Political Parties and Political Development, Four Decades Later". Party Politics. 13 (2): 141–154. doi:10.1177/1354068807073851.
- "The Organization 'Gap' in Political Science", in G. King, K. L. Schlozman and N. Nie (eds.), The Future of Political Science: 100 Perspectives (New York and London: Routledge, 2009).
- "Italy, It's That Way If You Think So", Italian Politics and Society, Spring 2012.

== See also ==
- Comparative politics
- Politics of Italy
