= Case study =

In-depth, detailed examination of a particular case

A case study is an in-depth, detailed examination of a particular case (or cases) within a real-world context. For example, case studies in medicine may focus on an individual patient or ailment; case studies in business might cover a particular firm's strategy or a broader market; similarly, case studies in politics can range from a narrow happening over time like the operations of a specific political campaign, to an enormous undertaking like world war, or more often the policy analysis of real-world problems affecting multiple stakeholders.

Generally, a case study can highlight nearly any individual, group, organization, event, belief system, or action. A case study does not necessarily have to be one observation (N=1), but may include many observations (one or multiple individuals and entities across multiple time periods, all within the same case study). Research projects involving numerous cases are frequently called cross-case research, whereas a study of a single case is called within-case research.

Case study research has been extensively practiced in both the social and natural sciences.

== Definition ==
There are multiple definitions of case studies, which may emphasize the number of observations (a small N), the method (qualitative), the thickness of the research (a comprehensive examination of a phenomenon and its context), and the naturalism (a "real-life context" is being examined) involved in the research. There is general agreement among scholars that a case study does not necessarily have to entail one observation (N=1), but can include many observations within a single case or across numerous cases. For example, a case study of the French Revolution would at the bare minimum be an observation of two observations: France before and after a revolution. John Gerring writes that the N=1 research design is so rare in practice that it amounts to a "myth".

The term cross-case research is frequently used for studies of multiple cases, whereas within-case research is frequently used for a single case study.

John Gerring defines the case study approach as an "intensive study of a single unit or a small number of units (the cases), for the purpose of understanding a larger class of similar units (a population of cases)". According to Gerring, case studies lend themselves to an idiographic style of analysis, whereas quantitative work lends itself to a nomothetic style of analysis. He adds that "the defining feature of qualitative work is its use of noncomparable observations—observations that pertain to different aspects of a causal or descriptive question", whereas quantitative observations are comparable.

According to John Gerring, the key characteristic that distinguishes case studies from all other methods is the "reliance on evidence drawn from a single case and its attempts, at the same time, to illuminate features of a broader set of cases". Scholars use case studies to shed light on a "class" of phenomena.

== Research design ==
As with other social science methods, no single research design dominates case study research. Case studies can use at least four types of designs. First, there may be a "no theory first" type of case study design, which is closely connected to Kathleen M. Eisenhardt's methodological work. A second type of research design highlights the distinction between single- and multiple-case studies, following Robert K. Yin's guidelines and extensive examples. A third design deals with a "social construction of reality", represented by the work of Robert E. Stake. Finally, the design rationale for a case study may be to identify "anomalies". A representative scholar of this design is Michael Burawoy. Each of these four designs may lead to different applications, and understanding their sometimes unique ontological and epistemological assumptions becomes important. However, although the designs can have substantial methodological differences, the designs also can be used in explicitly acknowledged combinations with each other.

While case studies may be intended to provide bounded explanations of individual cases or phenomena, they are often intended to generate theoretical insights into the characteristics of a broader population.

=== Case selection and structure ===
Case selection in case study research is generally intended to find cases that are representative samples and which have variations on the dimensions of theoretical interest. Using that is solely representative, such as an average or typical case is often not the richest in information. In clarifying lines of history and causation it is more useful to select subjects that offer an interesting, unusual, or particularly revealing set of circumstances. A case selection that is based on representativeness will seldom be able to produce these kinds of insights.

While a random selection of cases is a valid case selection strategy in large-N research, there is a consensus among scholars that it risks generating serious biases in small-N research. Random selection of cases may produce unrepresentative cases, as well as uninformative cases. Cases should generally be chosen that have a high expected information gain. For example, outlier cases (those which are extreme, deviant or atypical) can reveal more information than the potentially representative case. A case may also be chosen because of the inherent interest of the case or the circumstances surrounding it. Alternatively, it may be chosen because of researchers' in-depth local knowledge; where researchers have this local knowledge they are in a position to "soak and poke" as Richard Fenno put it, and thereby to offer reasoned lines of explanation based on this rich knowledge of setting and circumstances.

Beyond decisions about case selection and the subject and object of the study, decisions need to be made about the purpose, approach, and process of the case study. Gary Thomas thus proposes a typology for the case study wherein purposes are first identified (evaluative or exploratory), then approaches are delineated (theory-testing, theory-building, or illustrative), then processes are decided upon, with a principal choice being between whether the study is to be single or multiple, and choices also about whether the study is to be retrospective, snapshot or diachronic, and whether it is nested, parallel or sequential.

In a 2015 article, John Gerring and Jason Seawright list seven case selection strategies:

1. Typical cases are cases that exemplify a stable cross-case relationship. These cases are representative of the larger population of cases, and the purpose of the study is to look within the case rather than compare it with other cases.
2. Diverse cases are cases that have variations on the relevant X and Y variables. Due to the range of variation on the relevant variables, these cases are representative of the full population of cases.
3. Extreme cases are cases that have an extreme value on the X or Y variable relative to other cases.
4. Deviant cases are cases that defy existing theories and common sense. They not only have extreme values on X or Y (like extreme cases) but defy existing knowledge about causal relations.
5. Influential cases are cases that are central to a model or theory (for example, Nazi Germany in theories of fascism and the far-right).
6. Most similar cases are cases that are similar on all the independent variables, except the one of interest to the researcher.
7. Most different cases are cases that are different on all the independent variables, except the one of interest to the researcher.

For theoretical discovery, Jason Seawright recommends using deviant cases or extreme cases that have an extreme value on the X variable.

Arend Lijphart, and Harry Eckstein identified five types of case study research designs (depending on the research objectives), Alexander George and Andrew Bennett added a sixth category:

1. Atheoretical (or configurative idiographic) case studies aim to describe a case very well, but not to contribute to a theory.
2. Interpretative (or disciplined configurative) case studies aim to use established theories to explain a specific case.
3. Hypothesis-generating (or heuristic) case studies aim to inductively identify new variables, hypotheses, causal mechanisms, and causal paths.
4. Theory testing case studies aim to assess the validity and scope conditions of existing theories.
5. Plausibility probes, aim to assess the plausibility of new hypotheses and theories.
6. Building block studies of types or subtypes, aim to identify common patterns across cases.

Aaron Rapport reformulated "least-likely" and "most-likely" case selection strategies into the "countervailing conditions" case selection strategy. The countervailing conditions case selection strategy has three components:

1. The chosen cases fall within the scope conditions of both the primary theory being tested and the competing alternative hypotheses.
2. For the theories being tested, the analyst must derive clearly stated expected outcomes.
3. In determining how difficult a test is, the analyst should identify the strength of countervailing conditions in the chosen cases.

In terms of case selection, Gary King, Robert Keohane, and Sidney Verba warn against "selecting on the dependent variable". They argue for example that researchers cannot make valid causal inferences about war outbreaks by only looking at instances where war did happen (the researcher should also look at cases where war did not happen). Scholars of qualitative methods have disputed this claim, however. They argue that selecting the dependent variable can be useful depending on the purposes of the research. Barbara Geddes shares their concerns with selecting the dependent variable (she argues that it cannot be used for theory testing purposes), but she argues that selecting on the dependent variable can be useful for theory creation and theory modification.

King, Keohane, and Verba argue that there is no methodological problem in selecting the explanatory variable, however. They do warn about multicollinearity (choosing two or more explanatory variables that perfectly correlate with each other).

== Uses ==
Case studies have commonly been seen as a fruitful way to come up with hypotheses and generate theories. Case studies are useful for understanding outliers or deviant cases. Classic examples of case studies that generated theories includes Darwin's theory of evolution (derived from his travels to the Galapagos Islands), and Douglass North's theories of economic development (derived from case studies of early developing states, such as England).

Case studies are also useful for formulating concepts, which are an important aspect of theory construction. The concepts used in qualitative research will tend to have higher conceptual validity than concepts used in quantitative research (due to conceptual stretching: the unintentional comparison of dissimilar cases). Case studies add descriptive richness, and can have greater internal validity than quantitative studies. Case studies are suited to explain outcomes in individual cases, which is something that quantitative methods are less equipped to do. Case studies have been characterized as useful to assess the plausibility of arguments that explain empirical regularities. By emphasizing context across cases, case studies can be useful in identifying scope conditions and evaluating to what extent concepts and theories apply across cases.

Through fine-grained knowledge and description, case studies can fully specify the causal mechanisms in a way that may be harder in a large-N study. In terms of identifying "causal mechanisms", some scholars distinguish between "weak" and "strong chains". Strong chains actively connect elements of the causal chain to produce an outcome whereas weak chains are just intervening variables.

Case studies of cases that defy existing theoretical expectations may contribute knowledge by delineating why the cases violate theoretical predictions and specifying the scope conditions of the theory. Case studies are useful in situations of causal complexity where there may be equifinality, complex interaction effects and path dependency. They may also be more appropriate for empirical verifications of strategic interactions in rationalist scholarship than quantitative methods. Case studies can identify necessary and insufficient conditions, as well as complex combinations of necessary and sufficient conditions. They argue that case studies may also be useful in identifying the scope conditions of a theory: whether variables are sufficient or necessary to bring about an outcome.

Qualitative research may be necessary to determine whether a treatment is as-if random or not. As a consequence, good quantitative observational research often entails a qualitative component.

== Limitations ==
Designing Social Inquiry (also called "KKV"), an influential 1994 book written by Gary King, Robert Keohane, and Sidney Verba, primarily applies lessons from regression-oriented analysis to qualitative research, arguing that the same logics of causal inference can be used in both types of research. The authors' recommendation is to increase the number of observations (a recommendation that Barbara Geddes also makes in Paradigms and Sand Castles), because few observations make it harder to estimate multiple causal effects, as well as increase the risk that there is measurement error, and that an event in a single case was caused by random error or unobservable factors. KKV sees process-tracing and qualitative research as being "unable to yield strong causal inference" because qualitative scholars would struggle with determining which of many intervening variables truly links the independent variable with a dependent variable. The primary problem is that qualitative research lacks a sufficient number of observations to properly estimate the effects of an independent variable. They write that the number of observations could be increased through various means, but that would simultaneously lead to another problem: that the number of variables would increase and thus reduce degrees of freedom. Christopher H. Achen and Duncan Snidal similarly argue that case studies are not useful for theory construction and theory testing.

The purported "degrees of freedom" problem that KKV identify is widely considered flawed; while quantitative scholars try to aggregate variables to reduce the number of variables and thus increase the degrees of freedom, qualitative scholars intentionally want their variables to have many different attributes and complexity. For example, James Mahoney writes, "the Bayesian nature of process of tracing explains why it is inappropriate to view qualitative research as suffering from a small-N problem and certain standard causal identification problems." By using Bayesian probability, it may be possible to make strong causal inferences from a small sliver of data.

KKV also identify inductive reasoning in qualitative research as a problem, arguing that scholars should not revise hypotheses during or after data has been collected because it allows for ad hoc theoretical adjustments to fit the collected data. However, scholars have pushed back on this claim, noting that inductive reasoning is a legitimate practice (both in qualitative and quantitative research).

A commonly described limit of case studies is that they do not lend themselves to generalizability. Due to the small number of cases, it may be harder to ensure that the chosen cases are representative of the larger population.

As small-N research should not rely on random sampling, scholars must be careful in avoiding selection bias when picking suitable cases. A common criticism of qualitative scholarship is that cases are chosen because they are consistent with the scholar's preconceived notions, resulting in biased research. Alexander George and Andrew Bennett also note that a common problem in case study research is that of reconciling conflicting interpretations of the same data. Another limit of case study research is that it can be hard to estimate the magnitude of causal effects.

== Teaching case studies ==
Teachers may prepare a case study that will then be used in classrooms in the form of a "teaching" case study (also see case method and casebook method). For instance, as early as 1870 at Harvard Law School, Christopher Langdell departed from the traditional lecture-and-notes approach to teaching contract law and began using cases pled before courts as the basis for class discussions. By 1920, this practice had become the dominant pedagogical approach used by law schools in the United States.

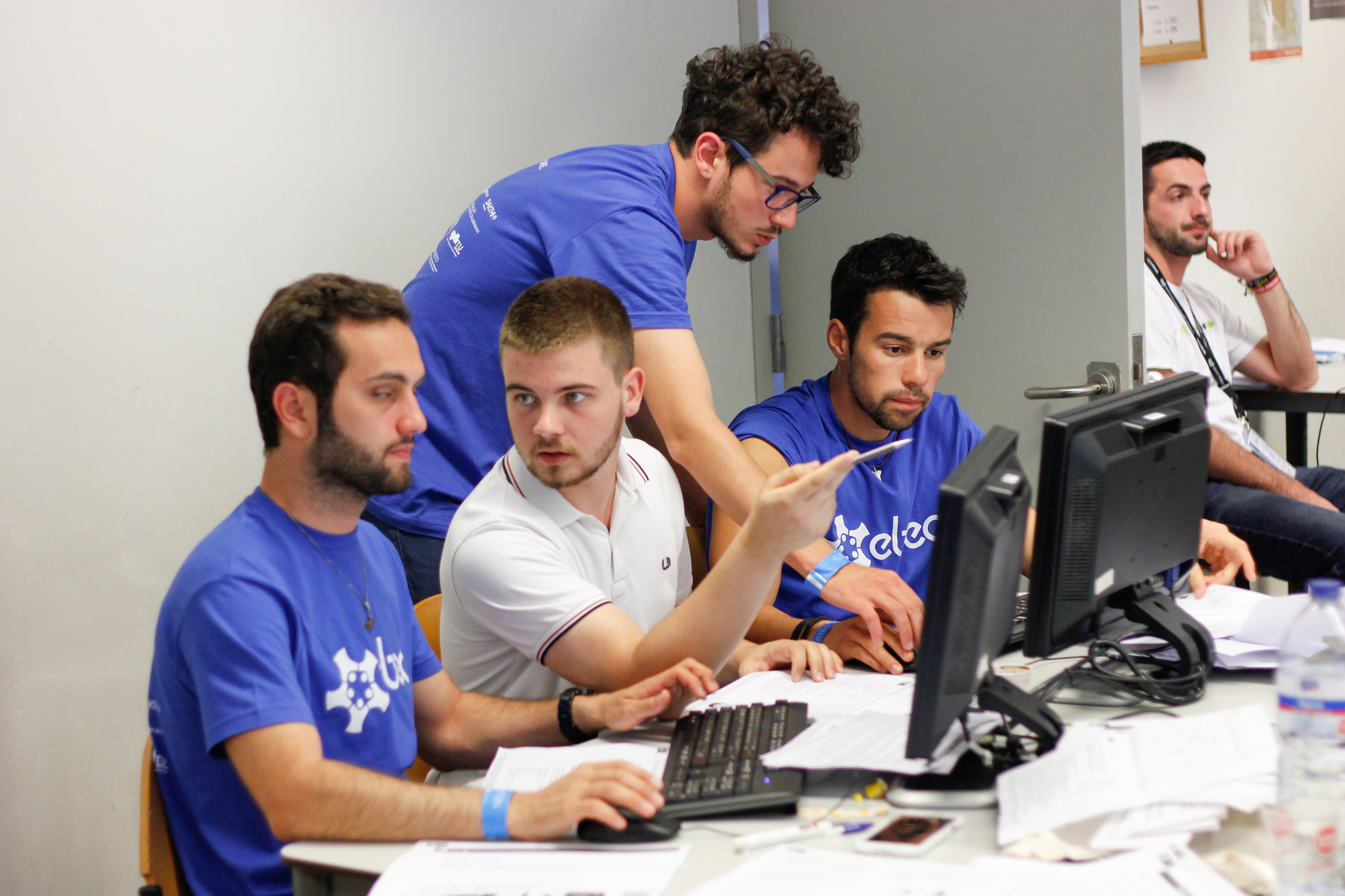
Engineering students participate in a case study competition.

Outside of law, teaching case studies have become popular in many different fields and professions, ranging from business education to science education. The Harvard Business School has been among the most prominent developers and users of teaching case studies. Teachers develop case studies with particular learning objectives in mind. Additional relevant documentation, such as financial statements, time-lines, short biographies, and multimedia supplements (such as video-recordings of interviews) often accompany the case studies. Similarly, teaching case studies have become increasingly popular in science education, covering different biological and physical sciences. The National Center for Case Studies in Teaching Science has made a growing body of teaching case studies available for classroom use, for university as well as secondary school coursework.

== See also ==
- Analytic narrative
- Casebook method
- Case method
- Case competition
- Case report
- Process tracing
