= Deductive pragmatism =

Deductive pragmatism is a research method aiming at helping researchers communicate qualitative assumptions about cause-effect relationships (causality), elucidate the ramifications of such assumptions and drive causal inferences from a combination of assumptions, experiments, observations and case studies.

Deductive pragmatism was invented in 2000 by Khaled Yassin at Bielefeld University during his study of the public health impact of the World Bank's structural adjustment programs in developing countries. The methodology came basically as a response to the fact that conventional epidemiological models for causation have serious limitations as a source of causal inference. This is particularly true for complex situations such as the impact of structural adjustment on health. Such an issue involves several reciprocally interacting variables that cannot be accurately accounted for by conventional correlational or associational approaches. Furthermore, a big part of the literature on the impact of structural adjustment encompasses subjective and qualitative assumptions, which lack a sound empirical base in most of the cases.

This unique methodology couples the affirmative nature of causal effects tracing measures (such as correlational or associational studies) with the interpretive nature of process tracing schemes usually found in case studies and other qualitative methods. Furthermore, it bridges the gap between the academic interests of research and the prescriptive demands of policy-making.

Deductive pragmatism consists of three basic steps; 1) Hypothesization of causal relations, 2) Verification of causal effects, and 3) Tracing of causal processes.

The invention of this new methodology represented a watershed for research into complicated public health issues. It liberated health research from medical and clinical research methods that had been restricted to situations of single or few etiological factors and single or few outcomes. It has, therefore, opened the door wide for public health research to conveniently and accurately assess the complexities of health-related phenomenon and dilemmas.
