= Sidney Verba =

American political scientist (1932–2019)

- Born: May 26, 1932; New York City, New York, U.S.
- Died: March 19, 2019 (aged 86); Cambridge, Massachusetts, U.S.
- Education: Harvard University (BA); Princeton University (MA, PhD)
- Scientific career
- Fields: Political science
- Workplaces: Harvard University

Sidney Verba (May 26, 1932 – March 4, 2019) was an American political scientist, librarian and library administrator. His academic interests were mainly American and comparative politics. He was the Carl H. Pforzheimer University Professor at Harvard University and also served Harvard as the director of the Harvard University Library from 1984 to 2007.

Verba was educated at Harvard College and Princeton University, and served on the faculty of Princeton, Stanford University, and the University of Chicago, before returning to Harvard, where he would spend the rest of his career. As he gave notice of his intention to retire in 2006, Verba observed: "Academics are the only people I can think of for whom this sentence makes sense: 'I'm hoping to get some time off so that I can get some work done.'"

== Early life and education ==
Verba grew up in Brooklyn, New York, where his family ran a "small mom-and-pop dry goods store and always worried about money." After high school he attended Harvard College, where he earned a degree in History and Literature. He began graduate school in the Woodrow Wilson School of Public and International Affairs at Princeton University, intending to join the foreign service, but transferred to Princeton's politics department and earned a Ph.D.

== Early career ==
After graduate school Verba stayed at Princeton as a research assistant and then assistant and associate professor. In 1964, Verba moved to Stanford University, where he was a full professor for four years, and the University of Chicago for another four years.

== Harvard faculty ==
As a member of the Harvard faculty, Verba's contributions to the life of the scholarly community extended beyond the realm of his academic discipline or his administrative title. For example, even though he "retired" in 2007, he continued to chair a University Committee on Calendar Reform which had begun its work in 2003. This committee was composed of students (undergraduate and graduate) and faculty members drawn from across the University’s Schools and Faculties. In 2008, the Committee's efforts reached fruition as Harvard President Drew Faust announced the adoption of a coordinated academic calendar that synchronizes the academic schedules of Harvard’s 13 Schools. Verba's committee managed to preserve the traditional eight-day reading periods for undergraduates, one of the best features of the former calendar, while eliminating impediments to student cross-registration. No less important, the Verba committee's work helped to align Harvard’s calendar with those of most colleges and universities in the U.S., making it easier for Harvard students to compete for internships, study-abroad experiences, and work opportunities during breaks and summer vacation.

== Librarian ==
Harvard President Derek Bok named Verba to be director of Harvard University Library in 1984; and when news of Verba's retirement was received in Massachusetts Hall, Bok observed:

"Professor Verba has led the Harvard libraries during one of their most transformative periods in University's history. ... When I appointed him more than 20 years ago, we were only beginning to realize what the revolution in information technology would mean. Sid's foresight has helped to preserve our valuable collections and opened Harvard's vast resources to scholars, researchers, and students throughout the world. I believe that generations of students will benefit from the doors that Sid has opened." -- Derek Bok.

When Verba retired from the post, he had served longer than anyone else who had held the title of director of the University Library; and not since Thaddeus Harris, whose tenure (1831–1856) straddled the card catalog revolution of the 19th century, had anyone spent so long at the top of Harvard's libraries.

Four specific areas in which Verba's contributions at Harvard have become the model for other academic and research libraries:

- HUL's "Harvard Depository" (HD) -- a "sophisticated way" of addressing the problem of needing to send books off campus.
  - With a fully digitized collection, "Harvard users gain online access to the full text of out-of-copyright books stored at HD. For books still in copyright, Harvard users could gain the ability to search for small snippets of text and, possibly, to view tables of contents. In short, the Harvard student or faculty member would gain some of the advantages of browsing that remote storage of books at HD cannot currently provide.
- HUL's Digital Initiative—influencing the ways libraries see themselves as responsible for creating and managing digital content.
  - "Plans call for the development of a unique union catalog linking the Google search engine with the online HOLLIS (Harvard Online Library Information System) catalog (http://holliscatalog.harvard.edu), thus furthering retrieval of information on the location and availability at Harvard of works identified through a Google search. This would merge the search capacity of the Internet with the deep research collections at Harvard into one seamless resource-a development especially important for undergraduates who often see the library and the Internet as alternative and perhaps rival sources of information.
- HUL's Open Collections Program -- something of a counterpart to the Google project, though less well known, it aims to digitize and make available university resources on a given topic.
  - Women Working, 1800–1930.
  - Immigration to the United States, 1789–1930.
  - Contagion: Historical Views of Diseases and Epidemic.
- HUL's preservation staff, facilities, and program.
  - "The possibility of a large-scale digitization of Harvard’s library books does not in any way diminish the University’s commitment to the collection and preservation of books as physical objects. The digital copy will not be a substitute for the books themselves. We will continue actively to acquire materials in all formats and we will continue to conserve them. In fact, as part of the pilot we are developing criteria for identifying books that are too fragile for digitizing and for selecting them out of the project."—Sidney Verba.

=== Harvard-Google digitization partnership ===
Verba was ultimately responsible for Harvard's participation in the Google Books Library Project, which involves a series of agreements between Google and major international libraries through which a collection of its public domain books will be scanned in their entirety and made available for free to the public online. Verba's role encompassed developing digitization protocols, addressing logistical and operations issues, and administering the project. The more difficult part of his job required moderating the institutional debate about anticipated consequences inherent in conventional content-vs.-collection strategies; and sometimes he took on the role of public spokesman.

=== Sidney Verba Endowment Fund ===
Friends and colleagues of Sidney Verba established a $2.5 million endowment fund in his honor. The Fund benefits the Harvard University Library, which provides University-wide services, including digital acquisitions and collections, information technology, high-density storage, and preservation. Under the terms creating the fund, Verba himself was given the freedom to designate the purpose of the new endowment.

== Political Scientist ==
The central focus of Verba's work as a political scientist can be summed up in one word -- "participation." Expanding the subject somewhat, that topic might be elaborated to "the issues of political participation by different groups." The great framing question of his work has been, "Whose voice is heard by the government?" Verba himself argued that issues having to do political participation have become central in America's political discourse today; but he attributes his initial interest in the subject to the prescient encouragement of his mentor, Professor Gabriel Almond at Princeton University. Verba earned his Ph.D. at Princeton in 1959; and in 1963, he was named as a co-author with Almond in The Civic Culture: Political Attitudes and Democracy in Five Nations. It popularized the idea of a political culture – a concept that includes national character and how people choose to govern themselves – as a fundamental aspect of society. Sidney Verba built on the theory of civic culture that was developed in this book with many of his students and collaborators, including Kay Lehman Schlozman and Henry E. Brady, over the following half century.

In retirement, he continued to explore his longtime interest in "the citizen voice" with a new study of interest groups in the United States, asking whom they represent—ethnic groups, women, trade associations, professions. His research goal was to produce "a kind of statistical model of what the interest groups in the U.S. look like."

== Honors ==
- American Philosophical Society (2003), member.
- Johan Skytte Prize (2002) for distinguished contribution to political science.
- American Political Science Association (APSA), president (1994).
  - APSA's Kammerer Prize (1972) for Participation in America.
  - APSA's Woodrow Wilson Prize (1976) for The Changing American Voter.
  - APSA's James Madison Prize (1993) for career contribution to the discipline.
- National Academy of Sciences (NAS), member.
  - NAS Committee on International Conflict and Cooperation, Chair.
- American Academy of Arts and Sciences (AAAS), fellow.
- Center for Advanced Study in the Behavioral Sciences (CASBS), fellow.
- Guggenheim Fellowship (1980).
- Social Science Research Council (SSRC).
  - SSRC Policy Committee, Chair.

== Selected works ==
Verba's published writings encompass 83 works in 201 publications in 8 languages and 16,633 library holdings.

- 2012 -- The Unheavenly Chorus: Unequal Political Voice and the Broken Promise of American Democracy by Kay Lehman Schlozman, Sidney Verba, and Henry E. Brady
- 2011 -- A Life in Political Science Annual Review of Political Science. DOI 10.1146/annurev-polisci-082409-094200
- 2005 -- Contest of Symbols: The Sociology of Election Campaigns through Israeli Ephemera by Hanna Herzog (Foreword by Sidney Verba). Cambridge: Harvard University Press. ISBN 978-0-674-01796-2 (paper)
- 2001 -- The Private Roots of Public Action: Gender, Equality, and Political Participation. Cambridge: Harvard University Press—with Nancy Burns and Kay Lehman Schlozman. ISBN 978-0-674-00601-0 cloth) ISBN 978-0-674-00660-7
- 1995 -- Voice and Equality: Civic Voluntarism in American Politics. Cambridge: Harvard University Press—with Kay Lehman Schlozman and Henry E. Brady. ISBN 978-0-674-94292-9 (cloth) ISBN 978-0-674-94293-6 (paper)
- 1994 -- Designing Social Inquiry: Scientific Inference in Qualitative Research Princeton: Princeton University Press—with Gary King and Robert Keohane. ISBN 978-0-691-03470-6 (cloth) ISBN 978-0-691-03471-3 (paper)
- 1987 -- Elites and the Idea of Equality: A Comparison of Japan, Sweden, and the United States. Cambridge: Harvard University Press—with Steven Kelman, Gary R. Orren, Ichiro Miyake, Joji Watanuki, Ikuo Kabashima, and G. Donald Ferree. ISBN 978-0-674-24685-0 (cloth) ISBN 978-0-674-24686-7; ISBN 978-0-674-24686-7 (paper)
- 1985 -- Equality in America: A View from the Top Cambridge: Harvard University Press—with Gary R. Orren. ISBN 978-0-674-25960-7 (cloth) ISBN 978-0-674-25961-4 (paper)
- 1972 -- Participation in America: Political Democracy and Social Equality. New York: Harper & Row—with Norman H. Nie. ISBN 978-0-06-046823-1; ISBN 978-0-06-046823-1 (cloth). [reprinted by The University of Chicago Press, Chicago. ISBN 978-0-226-85296-6 (paper)]
- 1963 -- The Civic Culture: Political Attitudes and Democracy in Five Nations. Princeton: Princeton University Press—with Gabriel Almond. [reprinted by Little, Brown, Boston, 1980. ISBN 978-0-316-03490-6 (cloth)], [reprinted by SAGE Publications, London ISBN 978-0-8039-3558-7 (paper)]
- 1961 -- Small Groups and Political Behavior: A Study of Leadership. Princeton: Princeton University Press. ISBN 978-0-691-09333-8 (cloth)
