= Ronald Rogowski =

Political scientist and professor

Ronald Rogowski (born May 16, 1944) is a political scientist who focuses on comparative politics and international political economy. He is a professor in UCLA's department of Political Science where he has taught since 1981. He has also taught at Duke University and Princeton University, and teaches in a visiting capacity at New York University Abu Dhabi. He obtained his PhD in Political Science in 1970 from Princeton.

He has written 12 peer-reviewed articles, mostly on international trade and electoral and political institutions, as well as two books, two monographs, three edited volumes and numerous other reviews. His most recent book Commerce and Coalitions "explores how international trade shapes domestic political coalitions."

== Select bibliography ==
- Rational Legitimacy: A Theory of Political Support (1974)
- Commerce and Coalitions: How Trade Affects Domestic Political Alignments (1989)
