= Kay Lehman Schlozman =

American political scientist

- Born: 23 December 1946
- Education: Wellesley College; University of Chicago
- Scientific career
- Fields: Political science
- Workplaces: Boston College
- Doctoral advisor: Sidney Verba

Kay Lehman Schlozman (born 23 December 1946) is an American political scientist, currently the J. Joseph Moakley Professor of Political Science at Boston College. Schlozman has made fundamental advancements to the study of participation in American politics, and was a pioneer in the field of gender and politics. Her contributions include the theory of civic voluntarism, several landmark studies on the relationship between access to resources and different types of political participation, and related investigations into the nature of civic culture. Schlozman has one of the highest citation counts of any political scientist, including being among the top 50 most cited active political scientists and top 10 most cited women in the discipline. She worked closely with Sidney Verba for nearly 50 years, first as his student and then as his collaborator.

== Early life and education ==
Schlozman was born on 23 December 1946 in Chicago, Illinois to Elliot Lehman and Frances Lehman. Schlozman majored in sociology and minored in English at Wellesley College, graduating with a BA in 1968. She then completed an MA and a PhD in political science at the University of Chicago in 1973 under the supervision of Sidney Verba.

== Career and contributions ==
Schlozman became a political science professor at Boston College in 1974. When she arrived at Boston College, Schlozman was the only woman in the department (and only one of 7 woman professors then working at Boston College), soon becoming the first woman in that department to receive tenure. She has been a visiting professor at Wellesley College, Harvard University, and Paris Diderot University, as well as a Fulbright Lecturer at Aix-Marseille University.

Schlozman has published widely on the causes of participation or non-participation in American politics, and the political mechanisms and institutions that enable and hinder civic engagement in America. She has focused particularly on gender and politics, the roles of interest groups in political processes, and political parties and elections in the United States. Schlozman is the coauthor of six books, and the editor of two more. She has also been noted for innovative teaching, and for unusually high departmental and professional service.

=== Political participation and institutions ===
Schlozman has contributed to the theory of political participation for four decades. Her first book was Injury to Insult: Unemployment, Class and Political Response, coauthored with Sidney Verba, which surveyed unemployed Americans to address the paradox that the unemployed, who appear to have the most to gain from political engagement, are also disproportionately politically inactive. Schlozman turned her attention to political structures and institutions in her second book, Organized Interests and American Democracy, in which she and her coauthor John T. Tierney used extensive interviews to document the expansion of interest groups in Washington, D.C. during the 1980s.

In 1995 Schlozman wrote perhaps her most important work, Voice and Equality: Civic voluntarism and American politics, with Sidney Verba and Henry E. Brady. This book develops a three-factor model of political engagement that the authors call "civic voluntarism". They develop and test the claim that citizens can only become political participants if they possess all three of the following conditions: the resources to engage in politics, a psychological engagement in politics, and some connection to a political recruitment network. John Aldrich reviewed Voice and Equality positively, writing that while it is not a complete theory of political participation in itself, it "will be a component of all kinds of theories of political behavior", while Jane Mansbridge described it as a fundamental advance in the theory of political participation that "documents how even in the realm of citizen participation liberal democracies fail to live up to the norm of equal responsiveness to the interests of each citizen".

Schlozman, Verba, and Brady further developed and tested their resource theory for several decades, and in 2012 they analyzed the implications of wealth inequality on political participation under the resource model in a book called The unheavenly chorus: Unequal political voice and the broken promise of American democracy. The book was noted for compiling and presenting data from throughout the authors' half-century of data collection. In 2018 the authors followed this analysis with a final book, Unequal and unrepresented: Political inequality and the peoples' voice in the new gilded age, but the nearly half century-long collaboration between Schlozman, Verba, and Brady ended with Verba's death in 2019.

=== Gender and politics ===
In addition to being a central scholar in the study of political participation, Schlozman was a pioneer in the study of gender and politics. One of her first works to explicitly engage with gender was an early article on campus sexual harassment; in 1991, prompted by allegations of sexual harassment against another member of her department at Boston College, Schlozman wrote an academic article investigating the sexual harassment of students by faculty members.

Most of Schlozman's work relating to gender, however, has also been connected to her interests in political participation. Her 2001 book The Private Roots of Public Action: Gender, Equality and Political Participation, coauthored with Nancy Burns and Sidney Verba, adds another dimension to the three requirements for participation that Verba, Schlozman, and Brady had studied in Voice and Equality: they now consider the influences on participation of citizens' private lives through mechanisms like domestic power relations and differential treatment in the workplace. They show that a small gender gap persisted in American political participation in the early 1990s even when political participation is understood quite broadly, with men performing slightly more political actions than women, but they argue that even a very small gap on an individual level can produce real differences in representation and policy outcomes in the aggregate. The book tests the hypothesis that individuals' private (and necessarily gendered) experiences affect their level of public political participation, using the theory of civic voluntarism. This addition to the theory was well received.

=== Impact ===
Schlozman is one of the most-cited scholars in political science. In 2019, she was ranked as the 45th most cited active political scientist in the world in a citation analysis by the political scientists Hannah June Kim and Bernard Grofman. This made her the 8th most cited woman who was actively conducting research in political science, as well as one of the 25 most-cited scholars who obtained their PhD between 1970 and 1974, and one of the 25 most-cited researchers of American politics. Many of her books and articles are considered landmark developments in the study of political participation, gender and politics, and civic culture.

Kay Schlozman is married to Stanley Schlozman. Schlozman's son, Daniel Schlozman, is also a professor of political science at Johns Hopkins University, and her daughter, Julia Schlozman, is an attorney.

== Awards and recognition ==
In 2003, Schlozman was named a member of the American Academy of Arts and Sciences. Some of her major awards include:

- Rowman and Littlefield Award for Innovative Teaching in Political Science from the American Political Science Association, 2004
- Frank Goodnow Award for Distinguished Service to the Profession of Political Science from the American Association of Political Science, 2006
- PROSE Awards, Government and Politics and Excellence in Social Sciences, from the American Association of Publishers, 2012
- Samuel Eldersveld Career Achievement Award, 2016
- Warren E. Miller Lifetime Achievement Award from the American Political Science Association, 2018
