= Analytic narrative =

Research method in social science

An analytic narrative is a social science research method seeking to combine historical narratives with the rigor of rational choice theory, particularly through the use of game theory.

The goal of analytic narratives is to provide several forms of discipline on the structure of case studies, such as a game, out of sample tests, and additional predictions that can be tested even if the main assertion about the case cannot.

Analytic narratives (Bates et al. 1998, 2000; Levi 2002, 2004) involve choosing a problem or puzzle, then building a model to explicate the logic of an explanation for the puzzle or problem, often in the context of a unique case. The method involves: the use of narrative to elucidate the principal players, their preferences, the key decision points and possibilities, and the rules of game in a textured and sequenced account; and the evaluation of the model through comparative statics and the testable implications the model generates. The analytic narrative approach is most attractive to scholars who seek to evaluate the strength of parsimonious causal mechanisms in the context of a specific and often unique case. The requirement of explicit formal theorizing (or at least theory that could be formalized) compels scholars to make causal statements and to identify a small number of variables as central to understanding the case.

This approach provides two methods for establishing the generalizability of the theory. First, the model in an analytic narrative often affords a range of explanations and predictions. Although the main account of a unique case may not be testable, the model may yield other predictions that can be tested, either in this case or in other cases. Second, as with other methods, out-of-sample tests constitute an important route to generalization. The presumption today in social science research is that the authors will provide those tests themselves. However, seldom does the level of knowledge for the out of sample case rival the detailed understanding of the original case that puzzled the author. The demonstration of generalizability must rest on a larger community of scholars who take the findings applicable to one place and time to illuminate a very different place and time.
