= Barbara Geddes =

American political scientist

- Born: October 15, 1944 (age 81)

Academic background
- Education: University of California, Berkeley

Academic work
- Discipline: Political science
- Institutions: University of California, Los Angeles

Barbara Geddes (born October 15, 1944) is an American political scientist. One of the primary theorists of authoritarianism and empirical catalogers of authoritarian regimes, she is currently a Professor Emeritus at the Department of Political Science at the University of California, Los Angeles. Her 2003 book Paradigms and Sand Castles is an influential research design book in comparative politics.

== Research ==
Geddes studies various authoritarian regimes and classifies them in five typologies: Military Dictatorships, Single-party Dictatorships, Personalist Dictatorships, Monarchies, and Hybrid Dictatorships. "Geddes' (1999) categorization of personalist, party, and military regimes and her use of this classification to examine theories regarding the survival of dictatorships and the likelihood of democratic transitions have been path breaking." In a 2014 article, the classification had seven typologies: dominant party regimes, military regime, personalist regimes, monarchies, oligarchic regimes, indirect military regimes, or hybrids of the first three. Thomas Pepinsky has described Geddes's work on authoritarianism as "path-breaking."

She is also interested in collapse of and transition between regimes. Her earlier work, "investigated bureaucratic reform and corruption in Brazil, the politics of economic policy making in Latin America, and political bargaining over institutional choice." Geddes has a regional focus on Latin America.

== Major works ==
- Geddes, Barbara (1994). Politician's Dilemma: Building State Capacity in Latin America. University of California Press. ISBN 978-0520207622.
- Geddes, Barbara (2003). Paradigms and Sand Castles: Theory Building and Research Design in Comparative Politics. University of Michigan Press. ISBN 978-0472068357.
- Geddes, Barbara; Wright, Joseph; Frantz, Erica (2018). How Dictatorships Work: Power, Personalization, and Collapse. Cambridge University Press. ISBN 9781107115828.

== Awards ==
In 2014, the Comparative Politics Section of the American Political Science Association awarded Geddes the Bingham Powell Graduate Mentoring Award. "The Autocratic Regimes Data Set" that Geddes created with Joseph G. Wright and Erica Frantz, political scientists at Penn State University and Michigan State University, respectively, garnered the Lijphart/ Przeworski/ Verba Data Set Award in 2015, also awarded by the Comparative Politics Section of the American Political Science Association.
