= Lyn Ragsdale =

American political scientist

- Died: 13 December 2020 (aged 66)
- Education: Arizona State University; University of Wisconsin–Madison
- Awards: Betty Moulds Lifetime Achievement Award, WPSA
- Scientific career
- Fields: Political science
- Workplaces: University of Arizona; University of Illinois at Chicago; Rice University; University of Iowa; Russell Sage Foundation

Lyn Ragsdale was an American political scientist. She was the Radoslav A. Tsanoff professor of public affairs, professor of political science, and Dean of Social Sciences at Rice University. She specialized in the American presidency, the United States Congress, and electoral behavior. Ragsdale died suddenly at the age of 66 on December 13, 2020.

== Early work and education ==
Ragsdale grew up in Milwaukee, Wisconsin. She studied political science at Arizona State University, graduating with a BA in 1974. She attended the University of Wisconsin–Madison, obtaining an MA in 1978 and a PhD in 1982, both in political science.

In 1983, Ragsdale joined the political science faculty at the University of Arizona. In 2001, she moved to the University of Illinois at Chicago; in 2006 she became a professor at Rice University. She has also held positions at the University of Iowa and the Russell Sage Foundation.

== Career ==
Ragsdale has co-authored two books: The Elusive Executive: Discovering Statistical Patterns in the Presidency with Gary King (1988), and The American Nonvoter with Jerrold G. Rusk (2017). She has also been the sole author of two books. She published Presidential Politics in 1993, and in 1996 she published Vital Statistics on the Presidency, which has been published in four editions. The book is a reference text of data regarding the institution of the President of the United States. Vital Statistics on the Presidency won the American Library Association's Choice Award and the Richard Neustadt Best Reference Book Award from the American Political Science Association.

Ragsdale was the Dean of the Rice University School of Social Sciences from 2006 until 2016. She had previously served as the head of the political science department at the University of Illinois at Chicago. Ragsdale was also the President of the Western Political Science Association in the year 1998–1999. She and William J. Dixon were the editors of Political Research Quarterly from 1996 to 2000.

Ragsdale won the 2019 Betty Moulds Lifetime Achievement Award from the Western Political Science Association.

Ragsdale has been cited in The New York Times, The Boston Globe, Bloomberg, and The Salisbury Post.

== Selected works ==
- The Elusive Executive: Discovering Statistical Patterns in the Presidency, with Gary King (1988)
- Presidential Politics (1993)
- Vital Statistics on the Presidency (1996)
- The American Nonvoter, with Jerrold G. Rusk (2017)

== Selected awards ==
- 2019 Betty Moulds Lifetime Achievement Award, Western Political Science Association (2019)
