= Georges Burdeau =

French constitutionalist (1905–1988)

Georges Burdeau (1905–1988) was a French constitutionalist.
