= Political methodology =

Subfield of political science

Political methodology is a subfield of political science that studies the quantitative and qualitative methods used to study politics and draw conclusions using data. Quantitative methods combine statistics, mathematics, and formal theory. Political methodology is often used for positive research, in contrast to normative research. Psephology, a skill or technique within political methodology, is the "quantitative analysis of elections and balloting".

Objective political research heavily relies on political methodology as it provides rigorous methods for analysis. Quantitative methods, including statistical analysis, can allow researchers to investigate large datasets and identify patterns or trends, such as to predict election outcomes. Oppositely, qualitative methods deal with deep analysis of smaller sets of data such as interviews, documents, and case studies. This methods of analysis are more specifically useful when it comes to analyzing complicated social phenomena and political behavior. By combining these two types of methods, researchers can get a more comprehensive understanding of political processes and outcomes.

== History of Political Methodology ==
=== Pre 2000s Development ===
The first steps toward developing quantitative analysis date back to the 1880s, where the first statistics course was offered at Columbia University, setting the stage for combining quantitative perspectives into politics. Then, in 1919, the first political science journal utilizing quantitative methods was published, which helped grow the development of the field. This led to the first major phase in the 1920s, where scholars such as Charles Merriam showcased the importance of incorporating statistics into various forms of analysis. Political scientists would gather diverse data, including election statistics and campaign data, in order to take the study away from simple observation and involve deep numerical input.

The second phase came about in the late 1960s with the behavioral revolution, which is characterized by the large increase in quantitative methods. By this time, over fifty percent of the American Political Science Review (ASPR) articles used these methods. In the 1970s, there was a shift towards creating original sets of data to measure specific abstract political concepts such as ideology and representation. Researchers and scholars used innovative approaches including content analysis and event counts to widen the analytical capabilities and answer previous unanswerable questions. A major development that occurred during this period was the use of advanced statistical methods from other fields, such as regression models, time series analysis, and scaling techniques. These methods, however, needed various adjustments and adaptations in order to better suite the field of political science. Development followed in the next couple of decades, notably with the addition of computational methods in the late 1980s onward. New methods using advance technology were used to perform much larger and impressive tasks such as simulation and advanced econometrics.

== Emerging Trends In Political Methodology ==
=== Big Data Usage ===
Since comparative politics is a relatively new field in the political science field, there are new trends that emerge within the subfield of political methodology. One of these new trends is the use of "Big Data". Political campaigns and political parties use complex datasets to try to push their agendas and make a better more personalized appeal towards their voter base. Usually, the origin of this data is from surveys and provided information from the voters themselves, but there are instances where these campaigns get their data from cookies or from purchasing the personal data collected by social media sites with the use of "layering data points".

The role that big data plays in the political process isn't fully understood yet since most political campaigns-especially in America- just now started to realize the power of social media, and putting effort into their own socials to target a younger audience. However, The quantitative nature of big data and how the internet influences politics in today's political atmosphere is where we can see the overlap between big data and its use in political methodology more clearly.

=== Machine Learning ===
Another big leap in political research techniques within political methodology is machine learning. Machine learning has become an increasingly interesting topic in other fields such as computer science, and even in the medical field. However, the field of political science has also been affected by this phenomenon. Most of those data sets that political campaigns use need to be sorted through, or applied to statistics in order to achieve accurate outcomes and forecasts for probabilities based on the datasets that were stored within the database. Machine learning also allows political scientists to test theories that are derived from the data, and can be put to use in their research methods. This process can narrow down the possibilities of outcomes using both hard data (quantitative) and soft data (qualitative) in simulated scenarios during the research process.

The use of Artificial Intelligence or AI is also a big component of political methodology and is becoming a huge tool for political scientists. Furthermore, more younger students use AI for a myriad of different things at an increasingly high rate already.

Since AI is being used increasingly in research and data collecting, there are some political scientists and researchers who want to find ways to increase civic engagement and information access through the use of AI.

=== AI Ethics in Political Methodology ===
There have been political analysts and pollsters that usually rely on empirical methods and statistical models in order to predict the outcome of elections, and other political scenarios. AI has already been used in political ads on a small scale, and in the US, there is not currently any rules against AI developing political ads or advertising material for political campaigns.

As mentioned before, AI mainly uses databases gathered from different methods to predict outcomes. However, at times these outcomes and as well as the way in which the data was used or stored can raise ethical concerns. Similar to how people react to other electronic devices "listening in" on them, people raise similar concerns with AI in regards to political data or personal data that identifies voters' preferences or concerns and is used by candidates for polling data. This aspect of AI transforms political research, but fails to account for the underlying biases, assumptions or privacy concerns associated with AI use in general.

== Political Methodology and Public Policy ==
=== Evidence-Based Decision Making ===
Since political methodology is heavily based in quantitative analysis political candidates tend to use these data figures to "play politics" with the opposing side, and to draw their own conclusions using this evidence. Furthermore, political researchers will often work hand in hand with political candidates or office holders to provide real-world examples as a framework for political candidates to base their policy proposals off of.

Politicians often use rhetoric that is believed to be supported by a factual basis, but often times the specific data or analysis that the candidates are referencing has been taken out of context in some regard.

== Journals ==
Political methodology is often published in the "top 3" journals (American Political Science Review, American Journal of Political Science, and Journal of Politics), in sub-field journals, and in methods-focused journals.

- Political Analysis
- Political Methodology
- Political Science Research and Methods

== Notable researchers ==
- Gary King
- Rob Franzese
- Jeff Gill
- Phil Schrodt
- Jan Box-Steffensmeier
- Simon Jackman
- Robert Abelson
- Charles Merriam
- Jonathan Nagler
- Jim Stimson
- Larry Bartels
- Donald Green
