= Harry H. Eckstein =

American political scientist (1924–1999)

Harry H. Eckstein (January 26, 1924 in Schotten, Germany – June 22, 1999) was an American political scientist. He was an influential scholar of comparative politics and political culture, as well as qualitative research methods.

== Early life and education ==
Eckstein was born on January 26, 1924, in Schotten, Germany, to a Jewish family, that was persecuted during the Holocaust. He came to the United States without his family at age 12, living in Columbus, Ohio. He was educated at Harvard University on a scholarship, earning a bachelor's degree summa cum laude in 1948, a master's degree in 1950, and a doctorate in 1953, all in Government. His undergraduate years at Harvard were interrupted by service in the United States Army in World War II, where he served in the Pacific War and attained the rank of master sergeant. His parents did not survive the war.

== Scholarly career ==
He taught at Harvard and then for 20 years at Princeton, after which he moved to the University of California, Irvine in 1980, where he held the title of Distinguished Research Professor of Political Science at his death. He taught at UC Irvine's School of Social Sciences and was the university's first faculty member with the title of Distinguished Professor.

In 1988, the journal Comparative Political Studies devoted a special issue to Eckstein. According to Gabriel A. Almond, "Few political scientists can claim to have made significant substantive as well as methodological contributions as has Harry Eckstein." Eckstein's 1975 essay on "crucial case studies" is considered influential in social science research design.

== Death and personal life ==
Eckstein lived in Orange County, California, and died there on June 22, 1999, at age 75. He was married five times; his first four marriages ended in divorce. His only child Jonathan Eckstein is a distinguished professor of Management Science and Information Systems at Rutgers University.
