= Process tracing =

Method to develop and test theories

Process tracing is a qualitative research method used to develop and test theories. Process-tracing can be defined as the "systematic examination of diagnostic evidence selected and analyzed in light of research questions and hypotheses posed by the investigator". Process-tracing thus focuses on (complex) causal relationships between the independent variable(s) and the outcome of the dependent variable(s), evaluates pre-existing hypotheses and discovers new ones. It is generally understood as a "within-case" method to draw inferences on the basis of causal mechanisms, but it can also be used for ideographic research or small-N case-studies. It has been used in social sciences (such as in psychology), as well as in natural sciences.

Scholars that use process tracing evaluate the weight of evidence on the basis of the strength of tests (notably straw-in-the-wind tests, hoop tests, smoking gun tests, double decisive tests). As a consequence, what matters is not solely the quantity of observations, but the quality and manner of observations. By using Bayesian probability, it may be possible to make strong causal inferences from a small sliver of data through process tracing. As a result, process tracing is a prominent case study method. Process tracing can be used to study one or a few cases, in order to determine the changes that have occurred over time within these cases and the causal mechanisms that are responsible for this change.

== Process tracing ==
Process-tracing can be used both for inductive (theory-generating) and deductive (theory-testing) purposes. Three variants of process tracing are "theory-testing process tracing," "theory-building process tracing," and "explaining outcome process tracing”. Among themselves, these variants differ from each other on the fact that they are theory- or case-based designs, they test or build theoretical causal mechanisms, they understand the generality of causal mechanisms differently, and they make different inferences. In 'theory-testing process tracing,' the goal is to test existing theories and the causal mechanisms assumed therein. On the contrary, 'theory-building process tracing' involves constructing a theory about a causal mechanism that can be applied to a broader population of a particular phenomenon. Through empirical evidence, a theoretical explanation is developed about causal mechanisms. In "explaining outcome process tracing," it is not about testing or building a theoretical mechanism, but it is about finding a satisfactory explanation for a given outcome. This variant constructs a detailed narrative that explains the process through which a specific outcome or series of events came to be.

Process-tracing differs from other qualitative analysis methods because of its focus on "how" causal mechanisms work; other qualitative analysis methods focuses at the correlation between the dependent and independent variable. Process-tracing looks beyond the correlation of two variables.

In terms of theory-testing, the process-tracing method works by presenting the observable implications (hypotheses) of a theory, as well as alternative explanations that are inconsistent with the theory. These observable implications and alternative explanations are based on theory-based hypotheses and key events. Once these observable implications are presented, they are then tested empirically to see which of the observable implications can be observed and which cannot. It is also important to test if alternative explanations are present. Process-tracing emphasizes the temporal sequence of events, and requires fine-grained case knowledge.

For testing the hypothetical theories, there are different types of requirements within a causal mechanism. There are necessary requirements, where the presence of one variable will always lead to the effect on the dependent variable. This means that the lack of the necessary requirement will also mean a lack of the rest of the mechanism. The second type of requirement is a sufficient requirement, where the presence of the requirement confirms the existence of a possible mechanism. Stephen Van Evera's influential typology of process-tracing tests distinguishes tests depending on how they adjudicate between theoretical expectations:

- Straw-in-the-wind tests: Failure or passage of this test neither lends strong support for or against the theory. This means that these tests only slightly weaken the rival hypotheses when the tested hypothesis gets proven. For this test, the requirements are neither necessary nor sufficient to prove the causal effects of the hypotheses.;
- Hoop tests: Failure to pass a hoop test can be disqualifying for a theory but passing the hoop test does not necessarily lend strong support for the theory. This is called a necessary condition. For the hoop test, the variable and the requirements are a necessary part to verify that part of the hypothesis. This means that a lack of the necessary requirement immediately disproves the hypothesis.;
- Smoking gun tests: Passing a smoking gun test lends strong support for theory, whereas failure does not necessarily lend strong support against the theory. This is called a sufficient condition. The requirements for the smoking gun test are sufficient but not necessary and passing the test significantly weakens rival hypotheses with different expected mechanisms.;
- Double decisive tests: Passing a double decisive test lends strong support for the theory while also lending strong support against alternative theories. For the double decisive tests both sufficient and necessary requirements are tested for the verification of the causal mechanism. When passing the test, it eliminates rival hypotheses, whilst failing strengthens the rival hypotheses substantially.

It is often used to complement comparative case study methods. By tracing the causal process from the independent variable of interest to the dependent variable, it may be possible to rule out potentially intervening variables in imperfectly matched cases. This can create a stronger basis for attributing causal significance to the remaining independent variables.

A limitation to process-tracing is the problem of infinite regress. While some influential works by methods scholars have argued that the ability of process-tracing to make causal claims is limited by low degrees of freedom, methodologists widely reject that the "degrees of freedom" problem applies to research that uses process-tracing, given that qualitative research entails different logics than quantitative research (where scholars do need to be wary of degrees of freedom). Some other disadvantages are:

- Process tracing has difficulty with probabilistic relationships, because probabilities are best expressed quantitatively. Process tracing is therefore best used when dealing with deterministic relationships which look at the requirements and different factors that are present;
- There is a risk of missing variables, because process tracing requires details about all your cases, including, for example, their history;
- Interpretation of data (i.e., choice of test) is subjective. There can be doubt about which process tracing test to use It is extra important that the researcher substantiates his or her thought process regarding the choice of a test;
- Process-tracing has low external validity because it focuses on specific cases.
- There is a requirement with process-tracing to have enough data for researching. Process-tracing requires evidence for every part of the causal mechanism within the cases, so the method can only be done when every part of the mechanism has enough evidence to research.

One advantage to process-tracing over quantitative methods is that process-tracing provides inferential leverage. In addition to aiding uncovering and testing causal mechanisms, process-tracing also contributes descriptive richness. In addition to that, process-tracing can also present the contextual conditions within certain processes take place. Another important advantage is that process tracing can deal with theoretical pluralism, which means hypotheses or conceptual models have multiple (un)dependent variables and causal relationships. This method of analysis is therefore suitable for understanding inherent complexity (Kay & Baker, 2015). The reason why process-tracing differs from other qualitative research methods is also an advantage.

By assigning probabilities to outcomes under specific conditions, scholars can use Bayesian rules in their process tracing to draw robust conclusions about the causes of outcomes. For example, if a scholar's theory assumes that a number of observable implications will happen under certain conditions, then the repeated occurrence of those outcomes under the theorized conditions lends strong support for the scholar's theory because the observed outcomes would be improbable to occur in the manner expected by the scholar if the theory were false. By using Bayesian probability, it may be possible to make strong causal inferences from a small sliver of data. For example, a video recording of a person committing a bank robbery can be very strong evidence that a particular person committed the robbery while also ruling out that other potential suspects did it, even if it is only a single piece of evidence.

Scholars can also use set theory in their process tracing.

== See also ==
- Case study
- Qualitative research
