= Henry E. Brady =

American political scientist

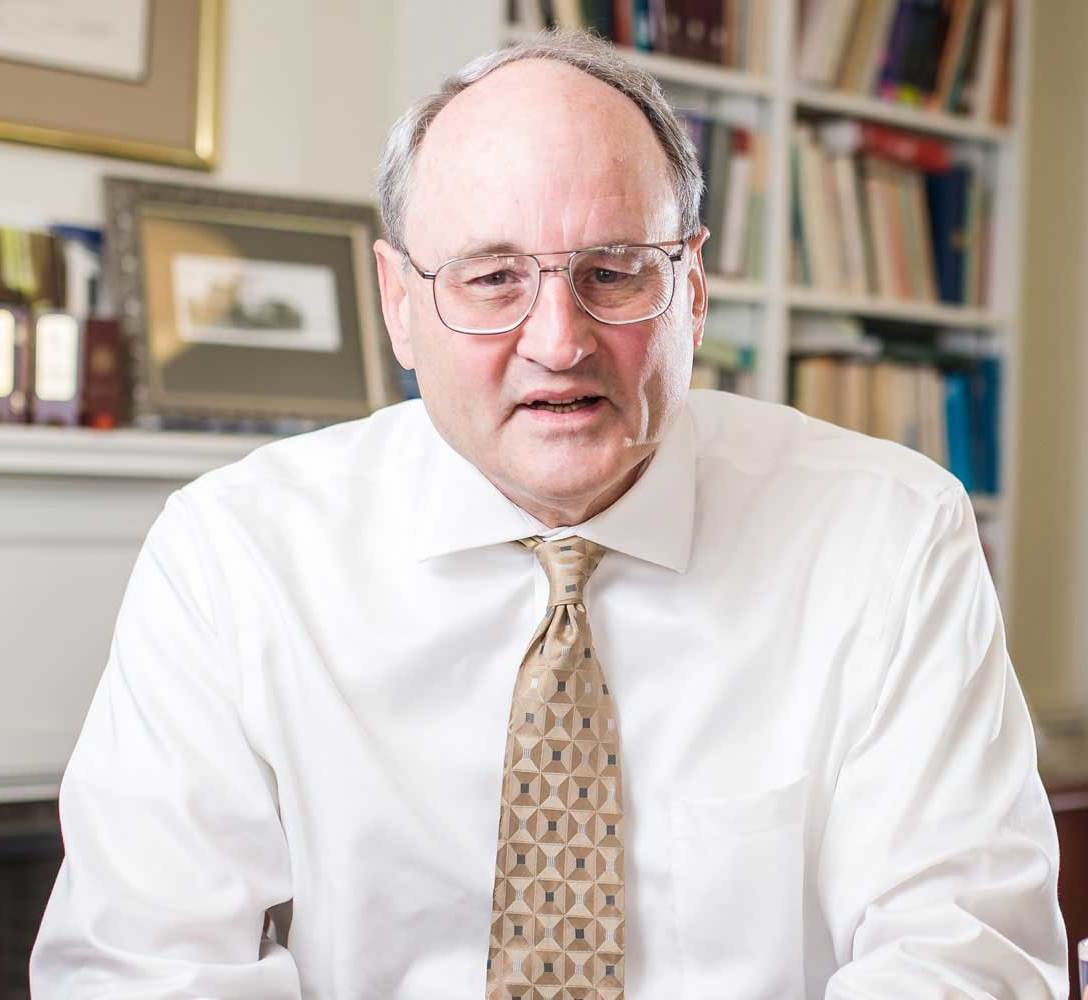
Brady in 2015

Henry Eugene Brady is an American political scientist specializing in political methodology and its application in a diverse array of political fields. He was Dean of the Goldman School of Public Policy at University of California, Berkeley from 2009–2021 and holds the Class of 1941 Monroe Deutsch Professor of Political Science and Public Policy. He was elected President of the American Political Science Association, 2009–2010, giving a presidential address entitled "The Art of Political Science: Spatial Diagrams as Iconic and Revelatory." He has published academic works on diverse topics, co-authoring with colleagues at a variety of institutions and ranks, as well as many solo authored works. His principal areas of research are on political behavior in the United States, Canada, and the former Soviet Union, public policy and methodological work on scaling and dimensional analysis. When he became President of the American Political Science Association, a number of his colleagues and co-authors contributed to his presidential biography entitled "Henry Brady, Big Scientist," discussing his work and the fields to which he has contributed and has also shaped.

== Education and career ==
Brady attended Harvey Mudd College of the Claremont Colleges, graduating in 1969 with B.S. in mathematics and physics. He attended Union Theological Seminary for a year, assisted by a fellowship, then entered the doctoral program at Massachusetts Institute of Technology. He completed doctorates in both economics and political science in 1980. He taught at University of California, Berkeley, Harvard University, University of Chicago, and returned to Berkeley in 1990.

At Berkeley, he has directed the Survey Research Center, January 1, 1999, to July 31, 2009. The Survey Research Center conducted in-person, telephone, and self-administered surveys in the United States, and California in particular. Earlier he directed the University of California Data Archive and Technical Assistance (now D-Lab) from 1992 to 2009, and served on its governing board. From 1988 to 1990, he was director of the University of Chicago, Center for the Study of Politics and Society, National Opinion Research Center (NORC). He served on the editorial boards of a number of major journals in the field, including American Journal of Political Science, Evaluation Review, American Political Science Review, and Political Analysis.

From 2000 to 2008, Brady worked to improve voting systems in the U.S. through his writing and work on legal cases. His work on voting systems includes involvement with the 2000 presidential election in Florida, Butterfly Ballot Case, and the 2003 efforts to get rid of punch card ballots, where he worked with the American Civil Liberties Union in California and Illinois to challenge their use. In the 2003 California gubernatorial recall election Brady's research on the punch card ballot was cited in the federal case seeking to postpone the special state election. Brady published an account of his role in the punch card ballot case.

== Honors and awards ==
- President, American Political Science Association, 2009–2010.
- Class of 1941 Monroe Deutsch Professor of Political Science and Public Policy, University of California, Berkeley. 2003 to present.
- PROSE Award for Excellence in the Social Sciences, Association of American Publishers for The Unheavenly Chorus: Unequal Political Voice and the Broken Promise of American Democracy
- Society for Political Methodology, Career Achievement Award, 2012.
- American Association for Public Opinion Research book award for Voice and Equality, 2012.
- Society for Political Methodology Fellow, 2008.
- Converse award (2007) for book making lasting contribution for Voice and Equality, 2007.
- Elected fellow, American Association for the Advancement of Science, 2006.
- Giovanni Sartori Book Award, American Political Science Organization 2005 for Rethinking Social Inquiry: Diverse Tools, Shared Standards (2004), with David Collier, Rowman and Littlefield.
- Harold Gosnell Prize for the best work of Political Methodology presented at a political science conference in the previous year. APSA, 2004.
- Elected member of the American Academy of Arts and Sciences
- Harold James Innis Prize 1992–1993 for Letting the People Decide: The Dynamics of a Canadian Election (September, 1992), with Richard Johnston, André Blais, and Jean Crête, Stanford University Press in the United States and McGill-Queens University Press in Canada the best book in English in Canada.

== Publications ==
=== Books ===
- Unequal and Unrepresented: Political Inequality and the People’s Voice in the New Gilded Age (May 2018), Princeton University Press, with Kay Schlozman and Sidney Verba. ISBN 978-0-691-18055-7
- The Unheavenly Chorus: Political Voice and the Promise of American Democracy (2012), Princeton University Press, with Kay Schlozman and Sidney Verba. ISBN 978-0-691-15986-7
- Rethinking Social Inquiry: Diverse Tools, Shared Standards, 2nd Edition, (2010), with David Collier. Rowman and Littlefield. Reprinted in a Japanese Edition in 2014.
- Oxford Handbook of Political Methodology (2008), Oxford University Press with Janet Box-Steffensmeir and David Collier (editors). ISBN 978-0-19-958556-4
- Capturing Campaign Effects (2006), University of Michigan Press, co-editor with Richard Johnston. ISBN 978-0-472-06921-7
- Rethinking Social Inquiry: Diverse Tools, Shared Standards (2004), with David Collier, Rowman and Littlefield. Winner of the 2005 Giovanni Sartori Best Book Award of the APSA Qualitative Methods Section. Republished in a Japanese edition, 2008.
- Voice and Equality: Civic Voluntarism in American Politics (1995), with Kay Schlozman and Sidney Verba, Harvard University Press.
- Letting the People Decide: The Dynamics of a Canadian Election (September, 1992), with Richard Johnston, André Blais, and Jean Crête, Stanford University Press in the United States and McGill-Queens University Press in Canada.ISBN 978-0-8047-2078-6 Winner of the Harold Adams Innis Award for the best book in the social sciences published in English in Canada in 1992–1993.

== Monographs ==
- "Counting All The Votes: The Performance of Voting Technology in the United States" (2001), with Justin Buchler, Matt Jarvis, and John McNulty. Berkeley: Survey Research Center and Institute for Governmental Studies.
- "Expensive Children in Poor Families: The Intersection of Childhood Disability and Welfare" (2000), with Marcia Meyers and Eva Seto. San Francisco: Public Policy Institute of California. ISBN 978-1-58213-055-2

=== Select articles, chapters, and reports ===
- "Repeated Cross-Sections in Survey Data" 2015, with Richard Johnson, in Emerging Trends in the Social and Behavioral Sciences, Robert Scott and Stephen Kossyln (eds.), Hoboken, NJ: John Wiley and Sons.
- "Political Mobility and Political Reproduction from Generation to Generation," with Kay Schlozman and Sidney Verba, The Annals, December 2014.
- "Do Two Research Cultures Imply Two Scientific Paradigms?" (2013), Comparative Political Studies, Volume 46:2, 252–265.
- "Who Speaks? Citizen Political Voice on the Internet Commons," (2011), Daedalus, Volume 140, Number 4, with Kay Schlozman and Sidney Verba.
- "The Art of Political Science: Spatial Diagrams as Iconic and Revelatory" (June 2011), Perspectives on Politics, Volume 9, Number 2. Presidential Address to the American Political Science Association.
- "Causation and Explanation in Social Science", The Oxford Handbook of Political Science (2011) DOI: 10.1093/oxfordhb/9780199604456.013.0049
- "Turning Out to Vote: the Costs of Finding and Getting to the Polling Place" (2011), American Political Science Review, Volume 105, Number 1, February, pages 115–134, with John McNulty.
- "Weapon of the Strong? Participatory Inequality and the Internet" (2010), Perspectives on Politics, Volume 8, Number 2, pages 487–510, with Kay Schlozman and Sidney Verba.
- "Political Methodology: Post-Behavioral Movements and Trends," 2009, Chapter 48 in Robert Goodin, Handbook of Political Science, Oxford University Press, with Janet Box-Steffensmeier and David Collier. (A completely revised version of the introduction to the Handbook of Political Methodology).
- "Conceptualizing and Measuring Political Identity" (2009), Chapter 2 in Rawi Abdelal, Yoshiko Herrera, Alastair Iain Johnston, and Rose McDermott, Measuring Identity: A Guide for Social Scientists, Cambridge University Press, with Cynthia Kaplan.
- "An Analytical Perspective on Participatory Inequality and Income Inequality" (2004) in Kathryn Neckerman (ed.), Social Inequality, New York: Russell Sage Foundation.
- "Refocusing the Discussion of Methodology" (2004) in Henry Eugene Brady and David Collier (eds.), Rethinking Social Inquiry: Diverse Tools, Shared Standards, Rowman and Littlefield, with David Collier and Jason Seawright pp. 3–20.
- "Defining Welfare Spells," (2003), Evaluation Review, Volume 27, Number 4:395–420. with Samantha Luks.
- "The Rolling Cross Section Design," (2001), Electoral Studies, 21(2):283–295.with Richard Johnston. Reprinted in Mark N. Franklin and Christopher Wlezien (eds.), The Future of Election Studies, Pergamon Press, 2002.
- "Law and Data: The Case of the Butterfly Ballot" (2001). PS: Political Science and Politics, 33(4):59–69. American Political Science Association. March, with Michael C. Herron, Walter R. Mebane Jr., Jasjeet Sekhon, Kenneth W. Shotts, and Jonathan Wand.
- "The Butterfly Did It: The Aberrant Vote for Buchanan in Palm Beach County, Florida." (2001), American Political Science Review, Volume 95, Number 4, December, pages 793–810, with Michael C. Herron, Walter R. Mebane Jr., Jasjeet Sekhon, Kenneth W. Shotts, and Jonathan N. Wand.
- "Trust the People: Political Party Coalitions and the 2000 Election," (2001) in Jack Rakove (ed.), The Unfinished Election of 2000: Leading Scholars Examine America's Strangest Election, New York: Basic Books.
- "Categorically Wrong? Nominal Versus Graded Measures of Ethnic Identity," (2001), Studies in Comparative International Development, Volume 35, Number 3, pages 56–91, with Cynthia Kaplan.
- "Subjects to Citizens: From Non-Voting, to Protesting, to Voting in Estonia During the Transition to Democracy" (2001), Journal of Baltic Studies, Volume 32, Number 4, pages 347–378, with Cynthia Kaplan.
- "Conceptualizing and Measuring Political Participation" (1999) John P. Robinson, Phillip R. Shaver, Lawrence S. Wrightsman (eds.), Measures of Political Attitudes, Academic Press.
- "Prospecting for Participants: Rational Expectations and the Recruitment of Political Activists" (1999) American Political Science Review, March pp. 153–168. with Kay Schlozman and Sidney Verba.
- "The Populist Right in Canada: The Rise of the Reform Party of Canada," (1998) in Hans-Georg Betz and Stefan Immerfall, The New Politics of the Right: Neo-Populist Parties and Movements in Established Democracies, St. Martin's Press: New York with Neil Nevitte, Andre Blais, Elisabeth Gidengil, and Richard Johnston.
- "Knowledge, Strategy, and Momentum in Presidential Primaries," (1996) Political Analysis, Volume 5, 1–38. University of Michigan: Ann Arbor.
- "Beyond SES: A resource model of political participation" with S Verba, KL Schlozman. American Political Science Review, (1995) vol. 89 (2) pp. 271–294.
- "Participation's Not a Paradox: The View from American Activists", British Journal of Political Science, (1995) 25(1), 1–36. With K. Scholozman and S. Verba doi:10.1017/S0007123400007043
- "Traits versus Issues: Factor versus Ideal Point Analysis of Candidate Thermometer Ratings" (1991), Political Analysis, 2:97–129.
- "The Dimensional Analysis of Ranking Data" (1990), American Journal of Political Science, 34(3):1017–1048.
- "The Nature of Utility Functions in Mass Publics" (1989) with Stephen Ansolabehere, American Political Science Review, 82(4):143–163.
- "Factor and Ideal Point Analysis for Interpersonally Incomparable Data" (1989), Psychometrika, 50(4):509–537.
- "What's the Primary Message: Horse Race or Issue Journalism" (1987) with Richard Johnston in Gary Orren and Nelson Polsby (eds.), Media and Momentum.
- "Conventions versus Primaries: A Canadian American Comparison" (1986) with Richard Johnston in George Perlin (ed.), Party Democracy: The Politics of National Party Conventions. Toronto: Prentice Hall.
- "Attitude Attribution" (1985) with Paul Sniderman, American Political Science Review, Volume 79, Number 4 pp. 1061–1078.
- "The Perils of Survey Research: Interpersonally Incomparable Responses" (1985), Political Methodology, 11.(3–4):269–291.
- "Statistical Consistency and Hypothesis Testing for Non Metric Multidimensional Scaling" (1985), Psychometrika, Volume 50, Number 4.
