= Gary King (political scientist) =

American political scientist

- Born: December 8, 1958 (age 67); New York City, New York, U.S.

Academic background
- Education: State University of New York at New Paltz (BA); University of Wisconsin–Madison (MA, PhD)
- Doctoral advisor: Leon Epstein

Academic work
- Discipline: Political science
- Sub-discipline: Political methodology
- Institutions: New York University; Harvard University
- Doctoral students: Jennifer Hill; Claudine Gay
- Notable works: Unifying Political Methodology (1989); Designing Social Inquiry (1994); A Solution to the Ecological Inference Problem (1997)
- Website: gking.harvard.edu

Gary King (born December 8, 1958) is an American political scientist, quantitative methodologist, and entrepreneur. He is the Albert J. Weatherhead III University Professor and Director for the Institute for Quantitative Social Science at Harvard University. King and his research group develop and apply empirical methods in many areas of social science research, focusing on innovations that span the range from statistical theory to practical application. He is one of the most cited political scientists of all time and the most cited political scientist of his generation.

== Biography ==
In 1980, King graduated summa cum laude with a Bachelor of Arts degree in political science from the State University of New York at New Paltz. In 1981, he earned a Master of Arts degree and, in 1984, a Doctor of Philosophy degree in political science from the University of Wisconsin–Madison in Madison. King claims that he paid for college by working as a magician.

King's career in academia began in 1984, when he became an assistant professor in the Department of Politics at New York University. He joined the faculty of Harvard's Department of Government in 1987 and has taught there since. He has also been a visiting fellow at Oxford University. To date, he has authored or coauthored eight books (six published and one forthcoming) and more than 175 journal articles and book chapters, and has won more than 55 prizes and awards for his work.

In 2009, Gary King was appointed as a University Professor at Harvard University, the institution's highest faculty honor. There are 25 such positions at Harvard, and incumbents are permitted to teach and conduct research across all 13 of the university's constituent schools.

He is the step-brother of the sociologist Mitchell Duneier.

== Business ==
King co-founded the data analytics companies Crimson Hexagon and Learning Catalytics and the educational technology companies Perusall and OpenScholar. Crimson Hexagon and its nearest competitor merged in 2018; the new company is called Brandwatch. Learning Catalytics was acquired by Pearson in April 2013. He was also part of the research team at Harvard that helped launch Perusall, an educational technology company.

== Honors ==
- Fellow, Guggenheim Foundation, 1994-5
- Fellow, American Academy of Arts and Sciences, 1998
- Fellow, American Association for the Advancement of Science, 2004
- Fellow, American Academy of Political and Social Science 2004
- Fellow, Society for Political Methodology, 2008 (Gosnell Prize from the Society in 1997 and 1999)
- Fellow, American Statistical Association 2009
- Fellow, National Academy of Sciences, 2010
- Fellow, National Academy of Social Insurance, 2014

== Selected publications ==
- Demographic Forecasting (Princeton, NJ: Princeton University Press, 2008), with Federico Girosi.
- "How Censorship in China Allows Government Criticism but Silences Collective Expression", American Political Science Review, Vol. 107, No. 2, pp. 1–18. With Jennifer Pan and Margaret E. Roberts.
- Ecological Inference: New Methodological Strategies (New York: Cambridge University Press, 2004), edited with Ori Rosen and Martin A. Tanner.
- A Solution to the Ecological Inference Problem: Reconstructing Individual Behavior from Aggregate Data (Princeton, NJ: Princeton University Press, 1997).
- Designing Social Inquiry: Scientific Inference in Qualitative Research (Princeton, NJ: Princeton University Press, 1994), with Robert Keohane and Sidney Verba.
- Unifying Political Methodology: The Likelihood Theory of Statistical Inference (Cambridge, UK and New York: Cambridge University Press, 1989; reprinted Ann Arbor, MI: University of Michigan Press, 1998).
- The Elusive Executive: Discovering Statistical Patterns in the Presidency (Washington, D.C.: Congressional Quarterly Press, 1988), with Lyn Ragsdale.
- The Presidency in American Politics (New York and London: New York University Press, 1989), with Paul Brace and Christine Harrington.

== See also ==
- Ecological validity
- Quantitative research
