= Comparative politics =

Field in political science

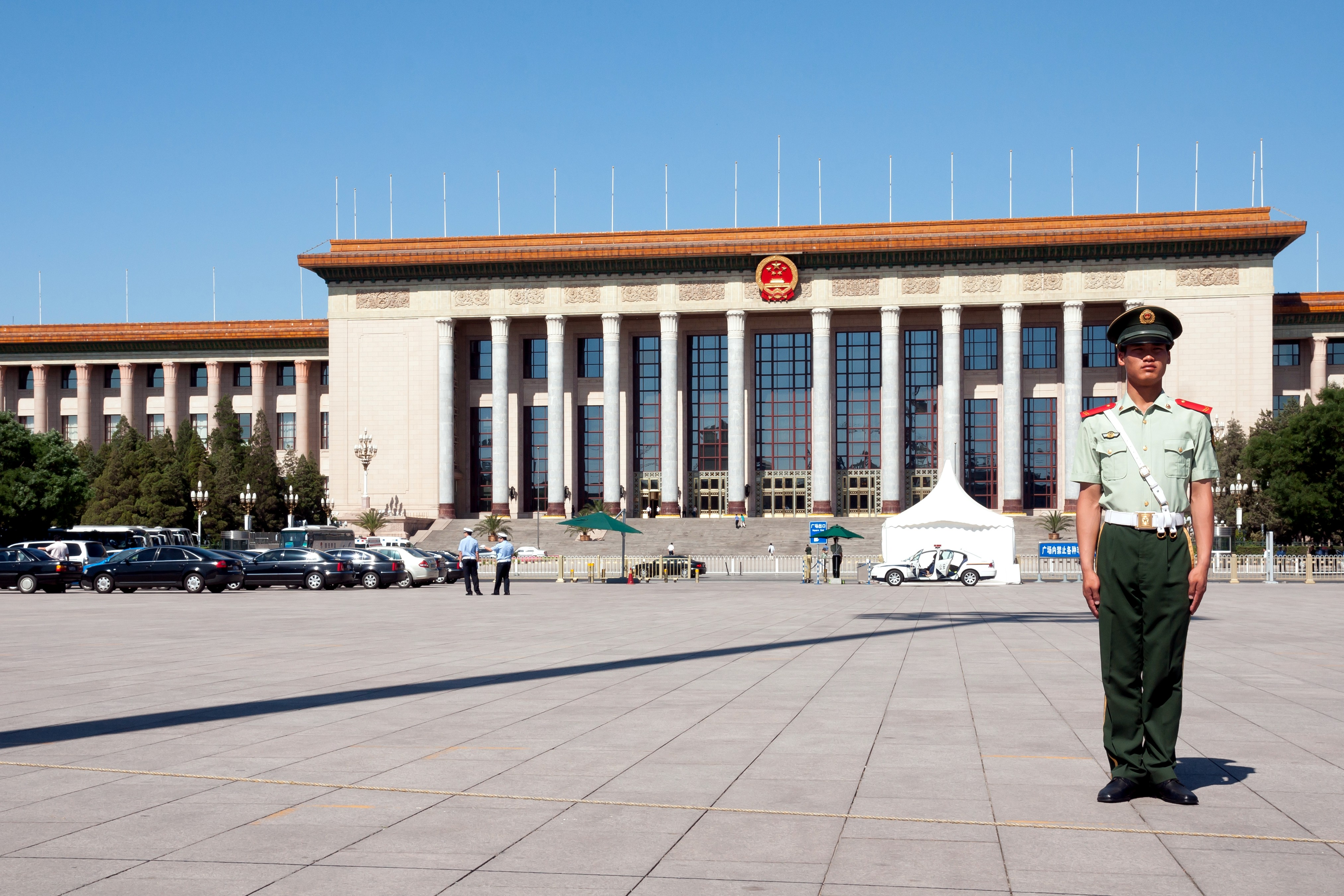
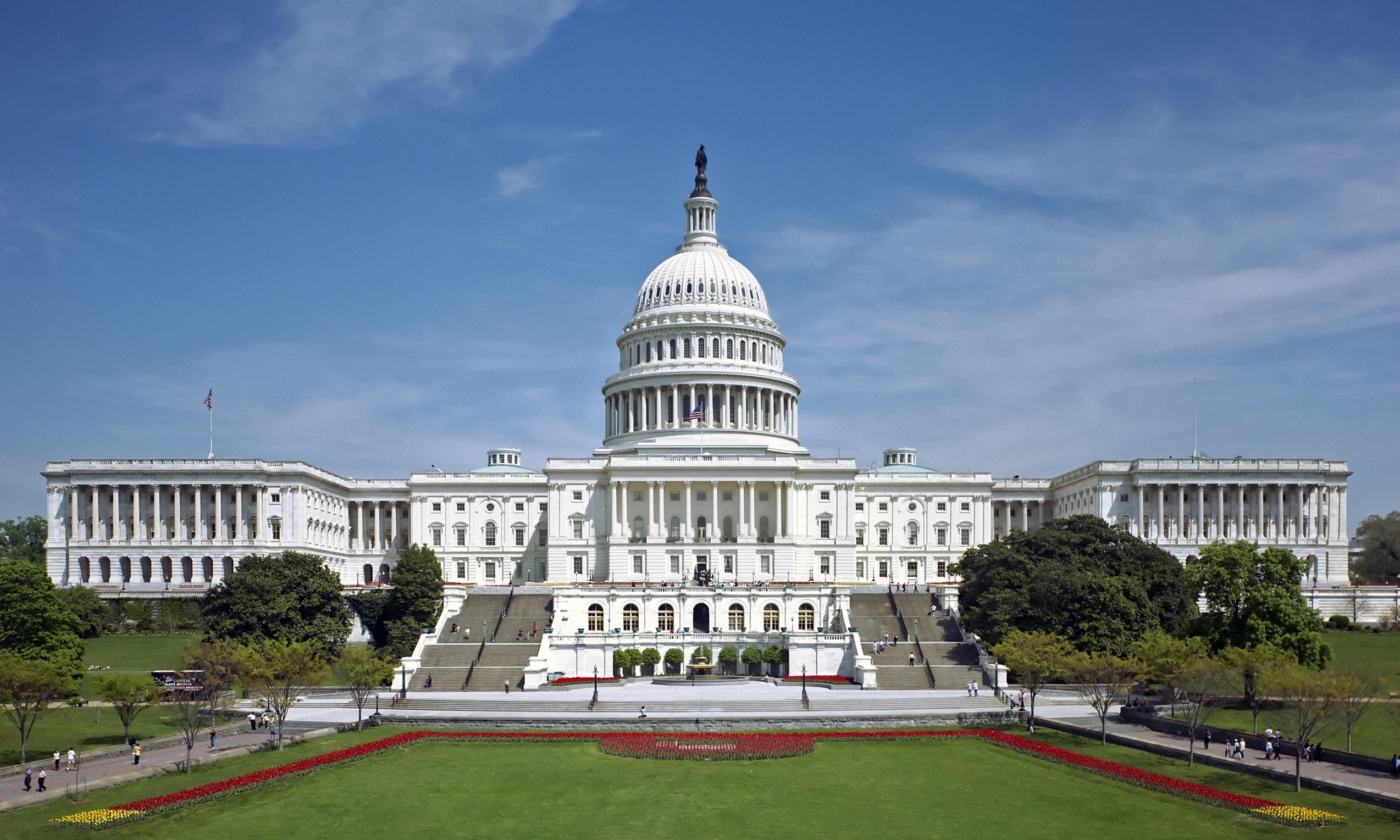
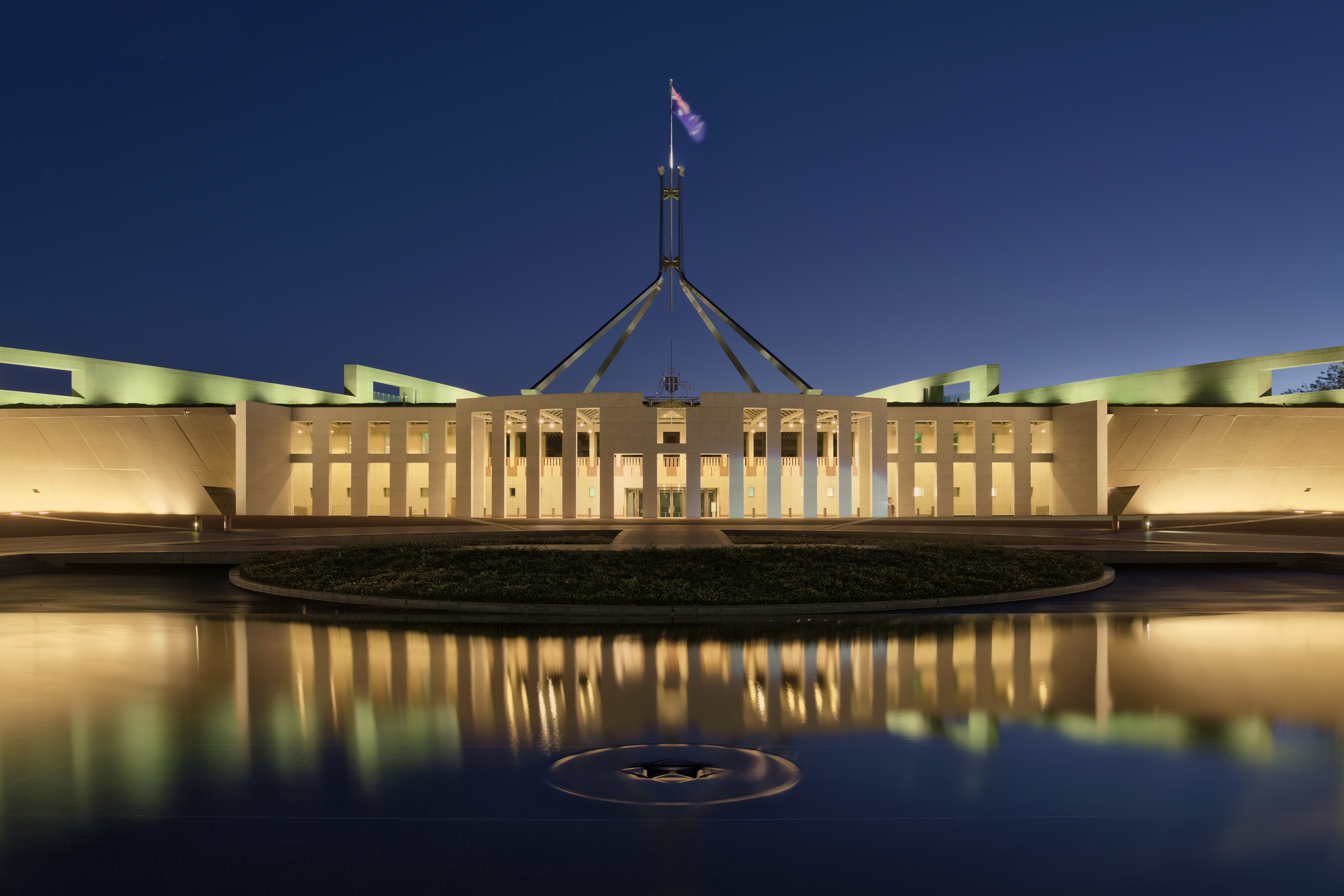
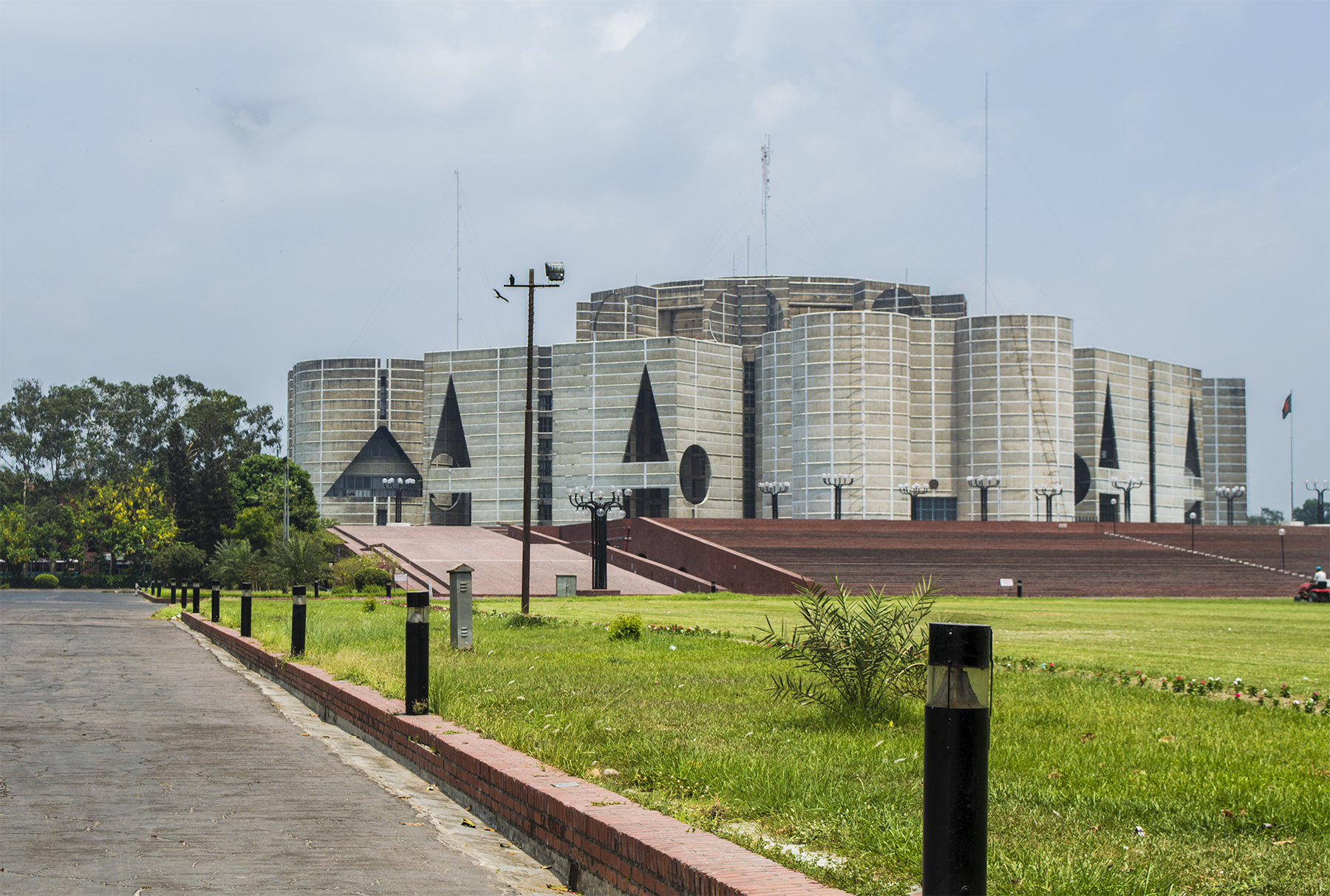
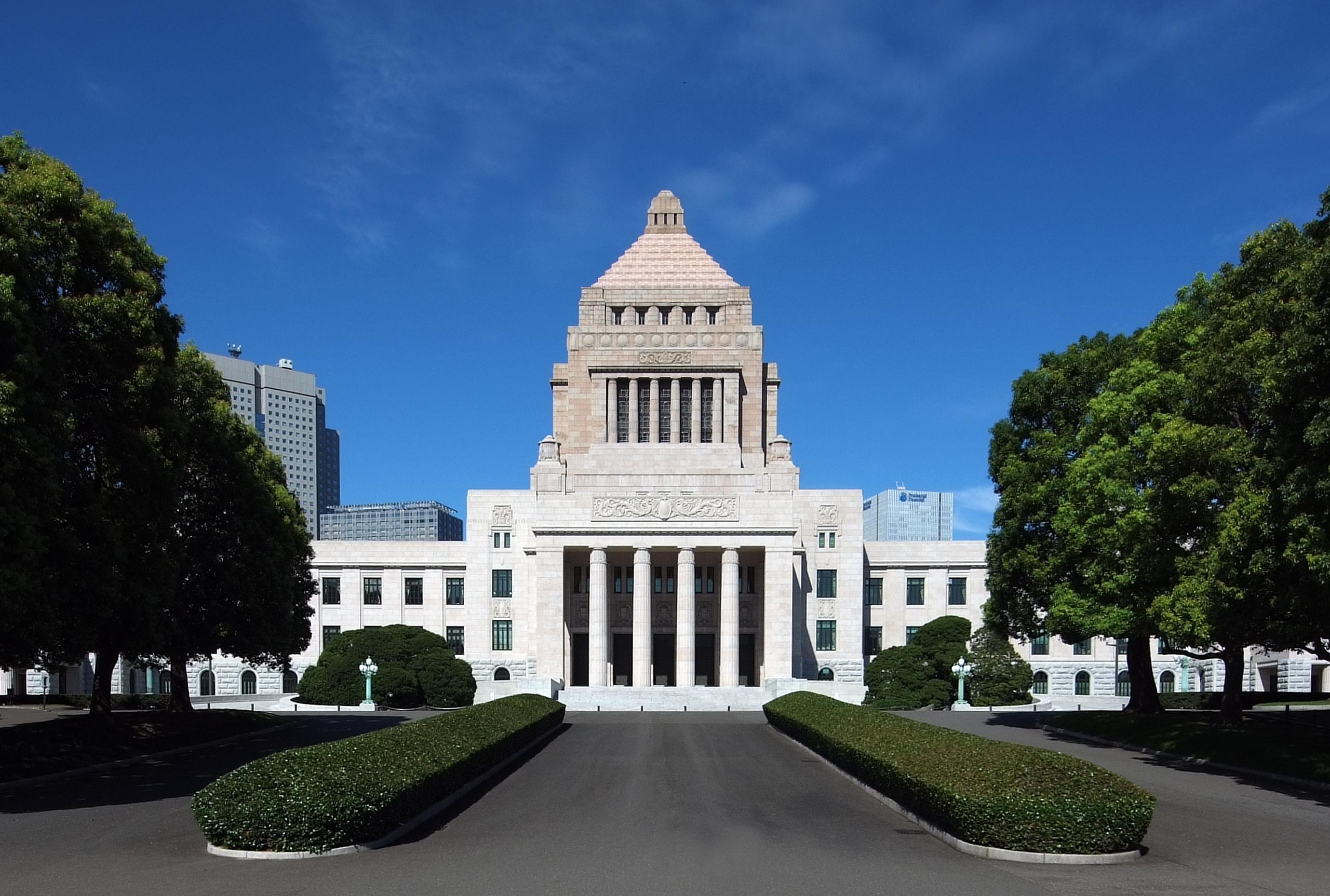
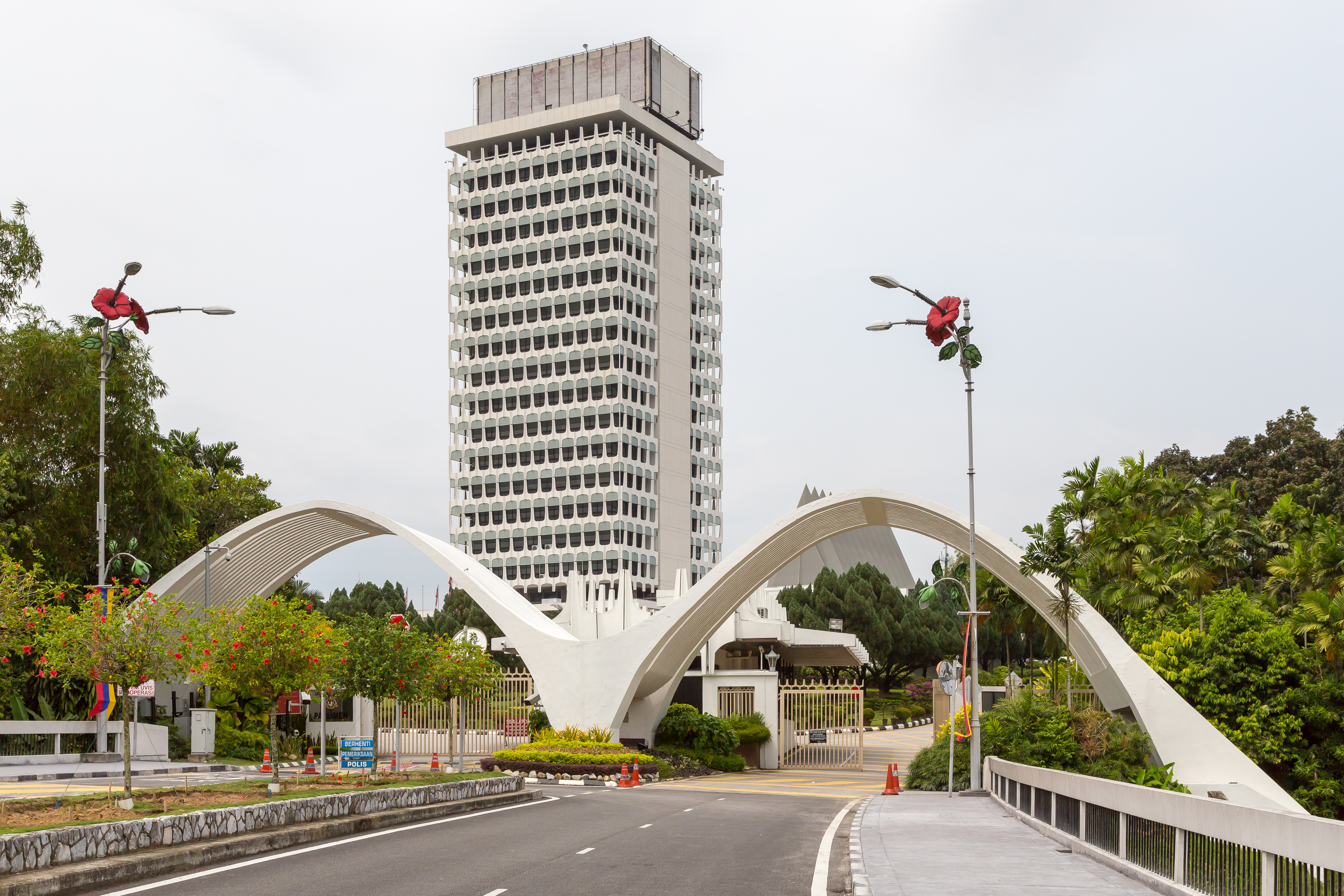
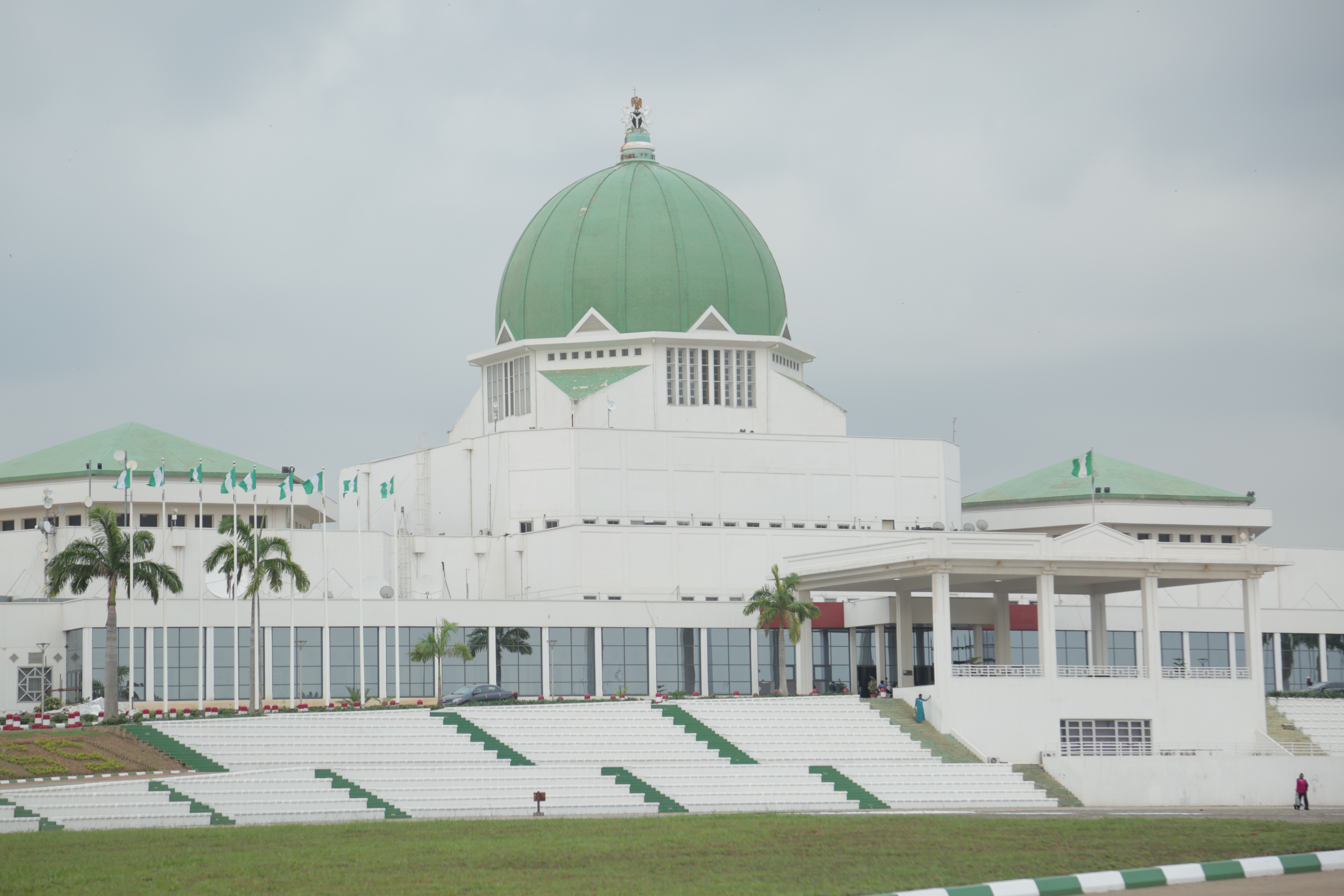
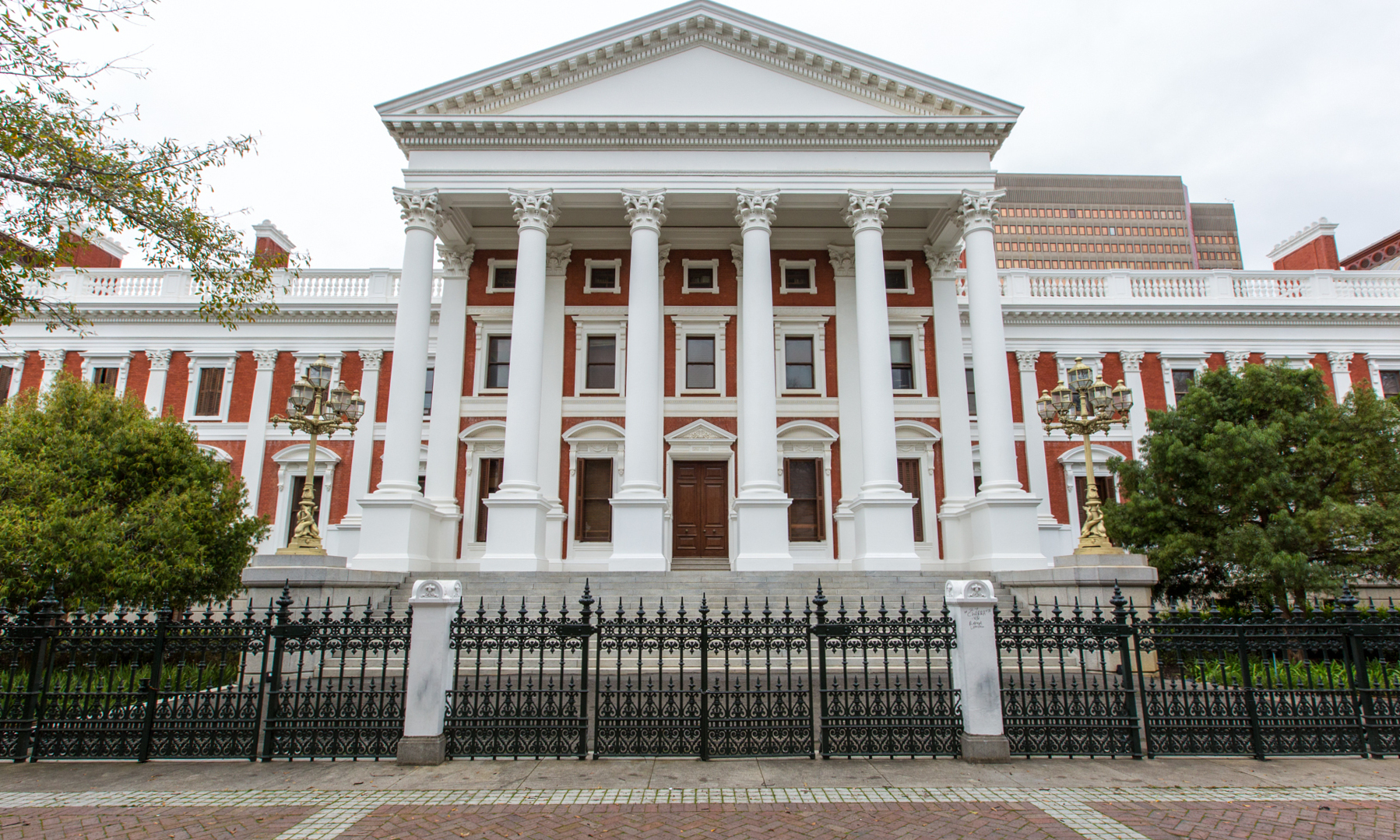
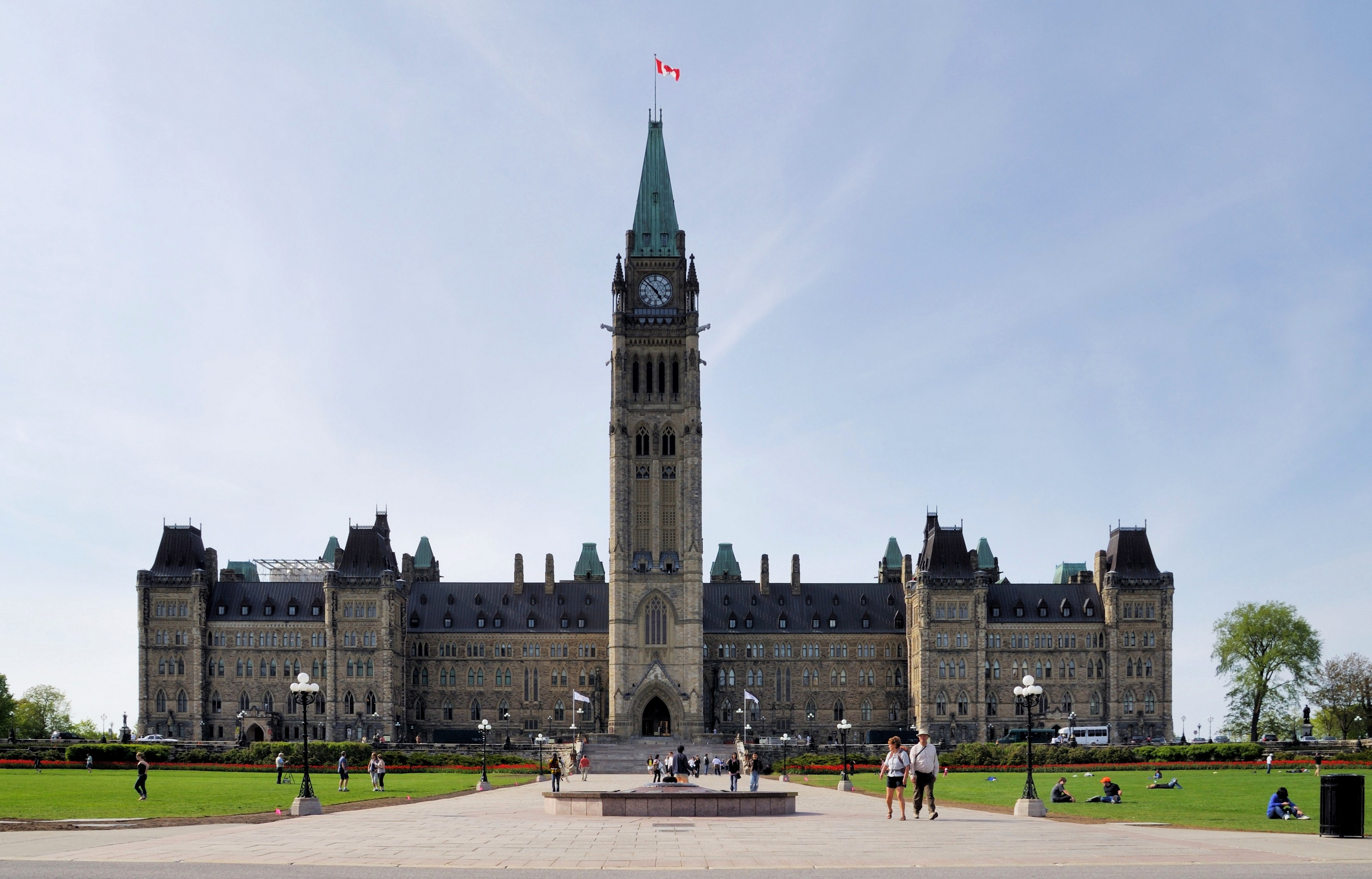
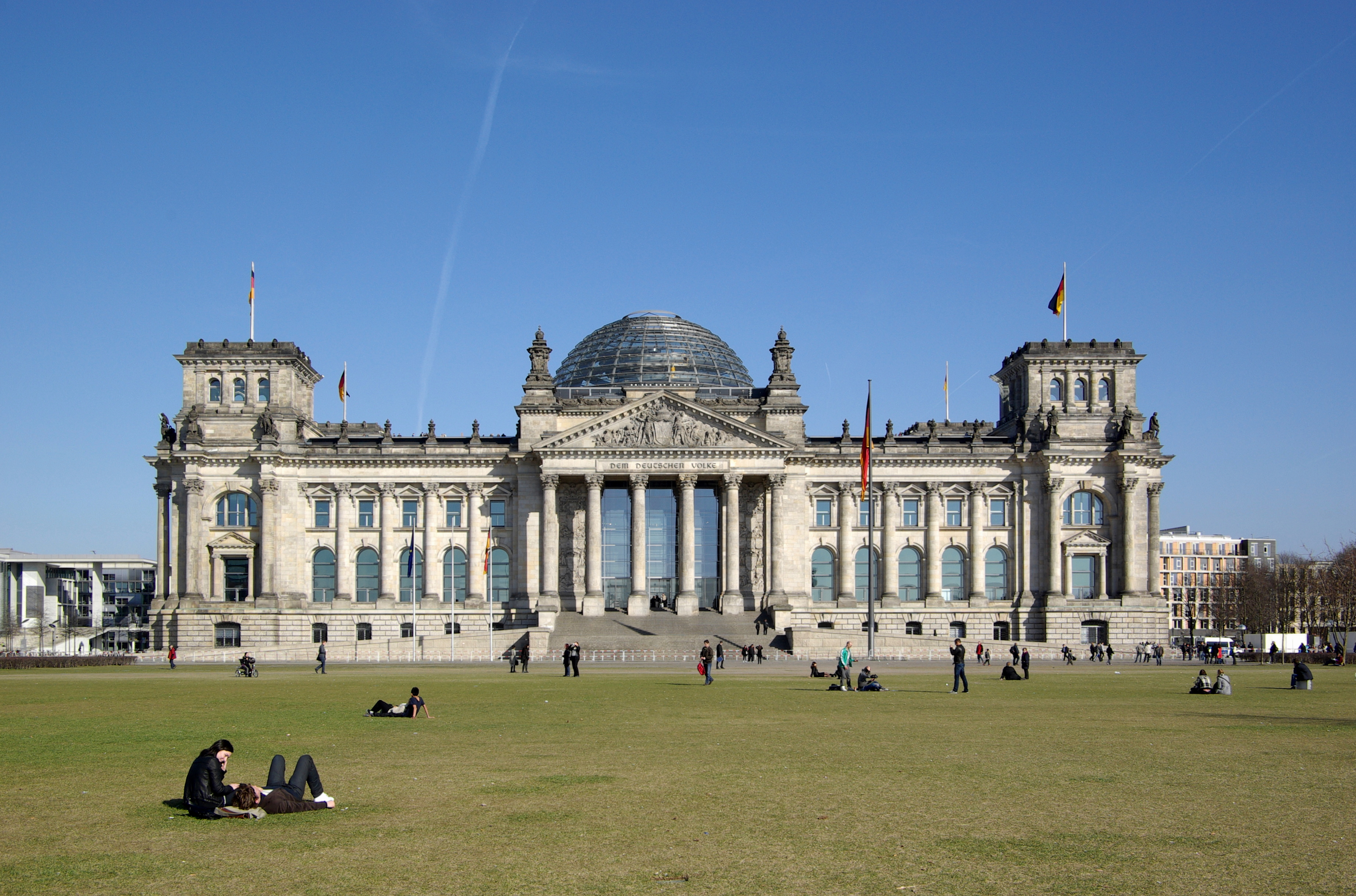
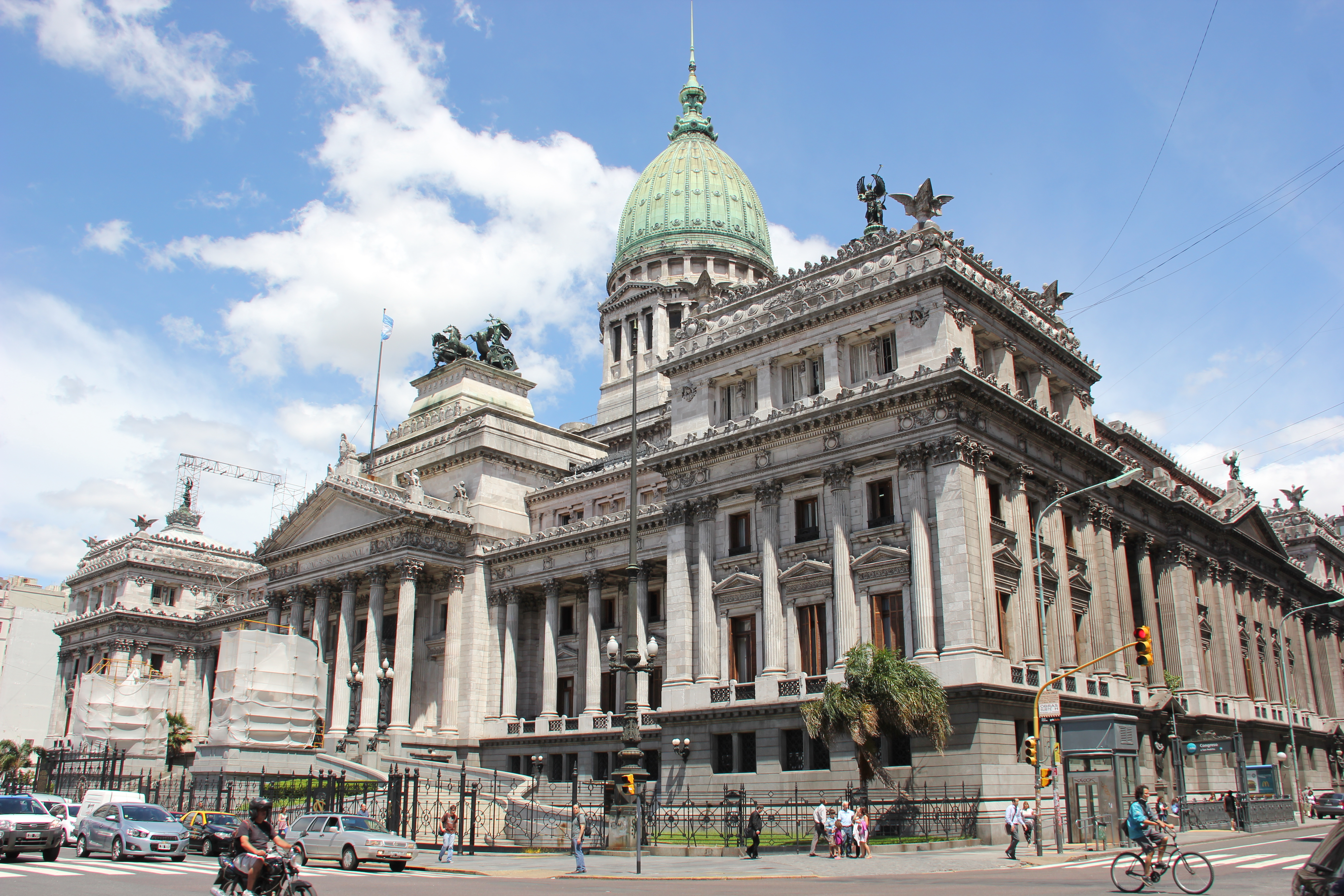
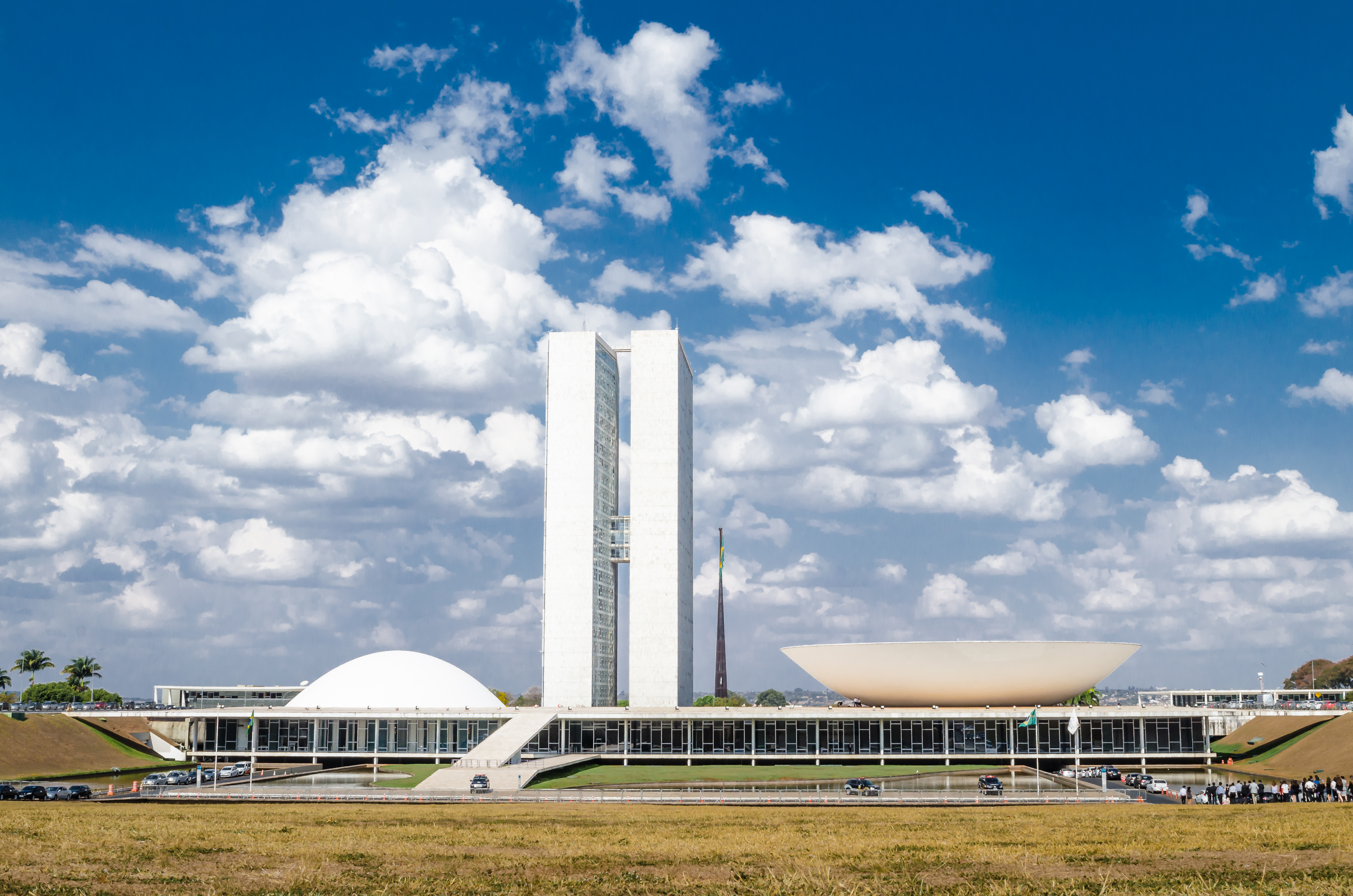
Select parliaments of the world, from top left to right: 1. National People's Congress, People's Republic of China; 2. United States Congress, United States of America; 3. Parliament of Australia, Australia; 4. Jatiya Sangsad, Bangladesh; 5. National Diet, Japan; 6. Parliament of Malaysia, Malaysia; 7. National Assembly, Nigeria; 8. Parliament of South Africa, South Africa; 9. Parliament of Canada, Canada; 10. Bundestag, Germany; 11. National Congress of Argentina, Argentina; 12. National Congress of Brazil, Brazil.

Comparative politics is a field in political science characterized either by the use of the comparative method or other empirical methods to explore politics both within and between countries. Substantively, this can include questions relating to political institutions, political behavior, conflict, and the causes and consequences of economic development. When applied to specific fields of study, comparative politics may be referred to by other names, such as comparative government (the comparative study of forms of government).

== Definition ==
Comparative politics is the systematic study and comparison of diverse political systems worldwide. Comparative politics analyzes differences in political regimes, governance structures, electoral systems, policy outcomes, and public administration across countries, regions, or time periods. It is comparative in seeking to explain why different political systems have similarities or differences and how developmental changes came to be between them. It is systematic in that it seeks trends, patterns, and regularities across these political systems. The research field examines political systems worldwide, focusing on themes such as democratization, globalization, and integration. New theories and approaches have been used in political science in the last 40 years, thanks to comparative politics. Some of these focus on political culture, dependency theory, developmentalism, corporatism, indigenous theories of change, comparative political economy, state-society relations, and new institutionalism. Some examples of comparative politics are studying the differences between presidential and parliamentary systems, democracies and dictatorships, parliamentary systems in different countries, multi-party systems such as Canada and two-party systems such as the United States. Comparative politics must be conducted at a specific point in time, usually the present. A researcher cannot compare systems across different time periods; they must be static.

While historically the discipline explored broad questions in political science through between-country comparisons, contemporary comparative political science primarily uses subnational comparisons. More recently, there has been increasing interest in subnational comparisons and their relationship to comparative politics. Subnational research contributes important methodological, theoretical, and substantive ideas to the study of politics.

The name comparative politics refers to the discipline's historical association with the comparative method, described in detail below. Arend Lijphart argues that comparative politics does not have a substantive focus in itself, but rather a methodological one: it focuses on "the how but does not specify the what of the analysis." Peter Mair and Richard Rose advance a slightly different definition, arguing that comparative politics is defined by a combination of a substantive focus on the study of countries' political systems and a method of identifying and explaining similarities and differences between these countries using common concepts.

Sometimes, especially in the United States, the term "comparative politics" is used to refer to "the politics of foreign countries." This usage of the term is disputed.

Comparative politics is essential for understanding the nature and functions of political systems worldwide. Political structures vary significantly across countries due to historical, social, ethical, and racial differences. Even political organizations that are similar operate differently from one another. For instance, India and the United States are majority-rule nations; nonetheless, the U.S. has a liberal, democratic presidential system, in contrast to India's parliamentary system. Even political decision-making is more diverse in the United States than in India's popular government. The United States has a president as its leader, while India has a prime minister. Related legislative issues prompt us to examine these central contracts and the fundamental differences between the two nations, despite both being democratic. This field of study is critical to international relations and conflict resolution. Comparative politics encourages international relations to clarify global legislative issues and the current winning conditions. Although both are subfields of political science, comparative politics examines the causes of international strategy and the effect of worldwide approaches and frameworks on domestic political conduct and functioning.

== History of the field ==
Harry H. Eckstein traces the history of the field of comparative politics back to Aristotle, and sees a string of thinkers from Machiavelli and Montesquieu, to Gaetano Mosca and Max Weber, Vilfredo Pareto and Robert Michels, on to James Bryce – with his Modern Democracies (1921) – and Carl Joachim Friedrich – with his Constitutional Government and Democracy (1937) – contributing to its history.

=== Two traditions reaching back to Aristotle and Plato ===
Philippe C. Schmitter argues that the "family tree" of comparative politics has two main traditions: one, invented by Aristotle, that he calls "sociological constitutionalism"; a second, that he traced back to Plato, that he calls "legal constitutionalism"".

Schmitter places various scholars under each tradition:

- 1. Sociological constitutionalism: Some classic scholars in this tradition are: "Polybius, Machiavelli, Montesquieu, Benjamin Constant, Alexis de Tocqueville, Lorenz von Stein, Karl Marx, Moisei Ostrogorski, Max Weber, Émile Durkheim, Robert Michels, Gaetano Mosca, Vilfredo Pareto, and Herbert Tingsten." Schmitter argues that, in the twentieth century, this tradition was known by the label of "historical political sociology" and included scholars such as "Stein Rokkan, T. H. Marshall, Reinhard Bendix, Otto Kirchheimer, Seymour Martin Lipset, Juan Linz, Hans Daalder, Mattei Dogan, Shmuel Eisenstadt, Harry H. Eckstein, and Dankwart Rustow."
- 2. Legal constitutionalism: Some classic scholars in this tradition are: "Léon Duguit, Georges Burdeau, James Bryce, A. Lawrence Lowell, and Woodrow Wilson." Schmitter argues that in the twentieth century this tradition was continued by: "Maurice Duverger, Herman Finer, Samuel Finer, Giovanni Sartori, Carl Joachim Friedrich, Samuel Beer, Jean Blondel, Ferdinand A. Hermens, and Klaus von Beyme."

=== Periodization as a field of political science ===
Gerardo L. Munck offers the following periodization for the evolution of modern comparative politics, as a field of political science - understood as an academic discipline - in the United States:

- 1. The constitution of political science as a discipline, 1880–1920
- 2. The Behavioral Revolution, 1921–1966
- 3. The Post-Behavioral Period, 1967–1988
- 4. The Second Scientific Revolution 1989–2005
- 5. Classical and early foundations (Ancient- 18th Century)
  - Comparative analysis can be traced back to Aristotle, who extensively compared various constitutions to understand political stability and governance.
  - Thinkers like Plato, Polybius, and later Montesquieu used comparison to determine and classify regimes and to study the relationship between social conditions and political organisations.
  - This era emphasises normative evaluation, putting what constitutes a just or stable government, rather than empirical testing, in the limelight.

=== Contemporary patterns, 2000–present ===
Since the turn of the century, several trends in the field have emerged.

- Decline of the dominance of rational choice theory
- Absence of a unifying metatheory
- Increased focus on causal inference and experimental methods
- Continued use of observational and qualitative methods
- Concerns about methodological dominance

== Substantive areas of research ==
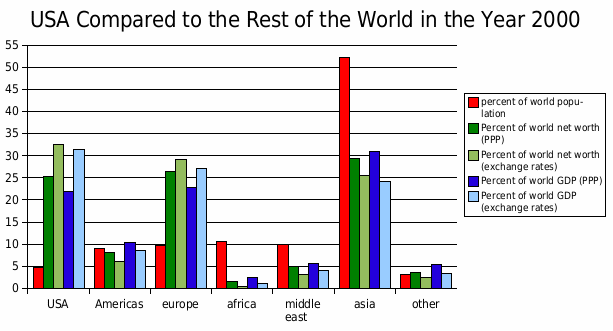
United States wealth compared to other regions of the world

By some definitions, comparative politics can be traced back to Greek philosophy, as Plato's Republic and Aristotle's The Politics.

As a modern sub-discipline, comparative politics is constituted by research across a range of substantive areas, including the study

- Politics of democratic states
- Politics of authoritarian states
- Public goods provision and distributive politics
- Political violence
- Political identity, including ethnic and religious politics
- Democratization and regime change
- Elections and electoral and party systems
- Political economy of development
- Collective action
- Voting behavior
- Origins of the state
- Comparative political institutions
- Methodologies for comparative political research
- Quantitative politics with democracy indices

While many researchers, research regimes, and research institutions are identified according to the above categories or foci, it is not uncommon to claim geographic or country specialization as the differentiating category.

The division between comparative politics and international relations is artificial, as processes within nations shape international processes, and international processes shape processes within states. Some scholars have called for an integration of the fields. Comparative Politics does not have similar "isms" as international relations scholarship.

== Super regions, regions of the world ==
Comparative politics examines various parts of the world. Political scientists refer to superregions and the key countries within them. Understanding which region is being referenced and what key nations the scientists are researching on is an essential part of comparative politics.

In political studies, identifying continents is crucial, as they encompass superregions within them, vast territories that share many similarities. For example, Latin America shares a common culture and language. Within super regions are smaller regions consisting of groups of individual countries that exhibit more closely related similarities.

== Methodology ==
While the name of the subfield suggests one methodological approach (the comparative method), political scientists in comparative politics use the same diversity of social scientific methods as scientists elsewhere in the field, including experiments, comparative historical analysis, case studies, survey methodology, and ethnography. Researchers choose a methodological approach in comparative politics driven by two concerns: ontological orientation and the type of question or phenomenon of interest.

=== (Mill's) comparative method ===
- Most Similar Systems Design/Mill's Method of Difference: This method consists of comparing very similar cases which only differ in the dependent variable, on the assumption that this would make it easier to find those independent variables which explain the presence/absence of the dependent variable.
- Most Different Systems Design/Mill's Method of Similarity: This method consists in comparing very different cases, all of which however have in common the same dependent variable, so that any other circumstance which is present in all the cases can be regarded as the independent variable.

=== Subnational comparative analysis ===
Since the turn of the century, many students of comparative politics have compared units within a country. Relatedly, there has been a growing discussion of what Richard O. Snyder calls the "subnational comparative method."

=== More methodologies and approaches ===
- Qualitative methods: Case studies, interviews, ethnography.
- Quantitative methods: Statistical analysis, large-N comparisons.
- Mixed methods: Combining both for more holistic insights.
- New methodologies: Computational methods (e.g., big data analytics, network analysis).

== Contemporary trends ==
In recent years, the field of comparative politics has evolved to address new challenges and developments in global and domestic political landscapes. Scholars have increasingly focused on the following trends:

=== Globalization and its political impacts ===
The interconnectedness of nations has transformed political systems and governance structures. Globalization has led to the diffusion of democratic norms, the rise of international organizations, and the increasing influence of transnational actors. At the same time, it has sparked debates over sovereignty and the backlash against global integration, exemplified by the rise of nationalist movements and populist leaders in various countries.

=== Digital technology and political change ===
The rapid proliferation of digital technology has revolutionized political communication, campaigning, and governance. Social media platforms have become crucial tools for political mobilization and grassroots activism. However, they have also been exploited for disinformation campaigns and cyber interference in elections, raising concerns about the impact of technology on democratic processes.

=== Rise of authoritarianism ===
While democracy has spread in many regions, there has been a concurrent resurgence of authoritarianism in others. Authoritarian regimes have employed sophisticated techniques, such as surveillance technology and media manipulation, to consolidate power. Comparative politics now examines how such regimes adapt to global pressures while maintaining domestic control.

=== Environmental politics ===
Climate change and environmental crises have become central concerns in comparative politics. Governments worldwide are addressing these issues through diverse policy approaches, ranging from international agreements such as the Paris Agreement to local initiatives. Comparative studies analyze how political systems and cultures influence the effectiveness of environmental policies.

=== Identity politics and social movements ===
Issues of identity, including race, gender, and ethnicity, have gained prominence in political discourse and policy debates. Comparative politics explores how social movements advocating for equality and justice shape political outcomes and how governments respond to them.

=== Role of international organizations ===
Institutions like the United Nations, World Trade Organization, and regional bodies such as the European Union have gained importance in shaping domestic policies. Comparative politics studies how states interact with these organizations and the implications for national sovereignty and governance.

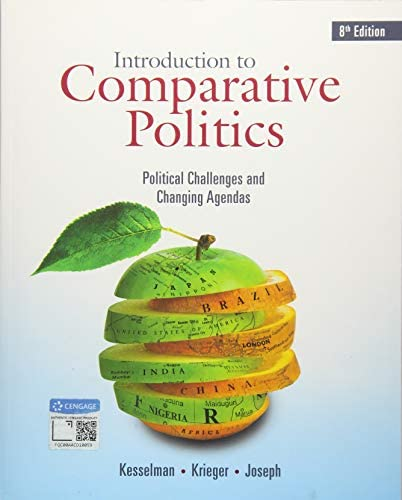

== See also ==
- Comparative historical research – Method in the social sciences
- Comparative law – Study of relationship between legal systems
- Comparative Political Studies – Academic journal
- Comparison of electoral systems – Comparative politics for electoral systems
- Critical juncture theory – Theory of large, discontinuous changes
- Historical institutionalism – Social science approach
- Historical sociology – Interdisciplinary field of research
- Institutional economics – Economics that focuses on institutions
- International relations – Study of relationships between states
- Modernization theory – Explanation for the process of modernization within societies
- Political science – Scientific study of politics and social science
- Political sociology – Interdisciplinary field of study
