= Outline of political science =

The following outline is provided as an overview of and topical guide to politics and political science:

Politics – the exercise of power; process by which groups of people make collective decisions. Politics is the art or science of running governmental or state affairs (including behavior within civil governments), institutions, fields, and special interest groups such as the corporate, academic, and religious segments of society.

Political science – the field concerning the theory and practice of politics and the description and analysis of political systems and political behavior.

== Fields of study of political science ==
- Comparative politics
  - Democratization
  - Polarization
  - Politicization
  - Multi-level governance
  - see § Electoral systems and § Political institutions
- Development studies
- Geopolitics and political geography
  - Area studies
  - Globalization studies
- Gender and politics
- Institutional theory
  - New institutionalism
- International relations
  - Security studies
    - Critical security studies
    - Copenhagen School
    - Paris school
    - Welsh school
- Nationalism studies
  - Banal nationalism
  - Diaspora politics
  - Irredentism
  - Nationalism and gender
  - Nationalist historiography
  - Postnationalism
  - Revanchism
- Political behavior
  - Political activism
    - Political movement
- Political economy
- Political fiction
  - Political satire
- Political research methodology
- Political sociology
- Political theory and philosophy
  - Political spectrum
    - Left–right political spectrum
- Positive political theory
  - Game theory
- Postcolonialism
- Psephology – study of elections
  - Voting theory
  - see § Electoral systems
- Policy analysis and Policy studies
  - Foreign policy analysis
  - Public administration and local government studies
  - Public law
- Strategic studies

== Related disciplines ==
- Anthropology
  - Political anthropology
- Economics
  - Political economy
- Geography
  - Political geography
- History
  - Political history
- Jurisprudence
  - Constitutional law
  - International legal theory
  - Political jurisprudence
- Philosophy
  - Ethics
  - Political philosophy
- Psychology
  - Political psychology
- Sociology
  - Political sociology

== Political theory ==
- Anarchist schools of thought hold that all forms of hierarchy and authority are illegitimate.
  - Social anarchism views individual freedom as interrelated with mutual aid.
  - Individualist anarchism
- Democratic theory
  - Athenian democracy a form of Greek democracy in which free male citizens had a direct vote on all government actions.
  - Republicanism a strain of political thought which was common among the city-states of the Italian Renaissance, such as the Republic of Venice.
  - Representative democracy
  - Direct democracy
    - Initiative
    - Referendum
  - Radical democracy
    - Deliberative democracy
    - Participatory democracy
  - Liberal democracy
  - Illiberal democracy
- International relations theory
  - Power in international relations
  - Realism in international relations
    - Neorealism (international relations)
  - Idealism in international relations
    - Liberalism (international relations)
    - Neoliberalism (international relations)
  - Marxist international relations theory
  - Functionalism in international relations
  - Critical international relations theory
- Majoritarianism
- Marxist schools of thought
  - Marxism-Leninism
  - Maoism
  - Trotskyism
  - Left communism
  - Anti-revisionism
  - Western Marxism
    - Structural Marxism
    - Neo-Marxism
    - The Frankfurt School
    - Autonomism
    - Analytical Marxism
    - Marxist Humanism
    - Marxist feminism
    - Post-Marxism
- Metapolitics
- Peace and conflict studies
  - Democratic peace theory
  - Power transition theory
  - Hegemonic stability theory
- Political geography
- Political symbolism
- Postcolonialism
  - Decoloniality
    - Blue water thesis
  - Three-world model
    - Third-Worldism
- Theories of state
  - Consent of the governed
    - Social contract
    - Secession
    - Right of rebellion
  - Form of government
  - Islamic state
  - Nationalism
  - Patriotism
  - Sovereignty

== Decision-making ==
=== Election ===
- Electoral systems
  - Plurality voting allows each voter to vote for a single candidate, with the candidate with most votes being the winner. It is often combined with single-member districts, resulting in a majoritarian democracy.
    - Cardinal voting systems
      - Approval voting
      - Satisfaction approval voting
      - Majority judgment
      - STAR voting
    - First-past-the-post voting
    - Single non-transferable vote
    - Limited voting
    - Plurality-at-large voting
    - General ticket
  - Proportional representation ensures that proportions of representation allocated in the elected body reflect their proportions of support among the electorate. Often combined with multi-member districts to produce consensus democracy.
    - Party-list proportional representation
      - proportionality measures
  - Mixed electoral systems
    - Mixed-member proportional representation
    - Parallel voting
    - Scorporo
    - Majority bonus system
    - Alternative vote plus
    - Dual-member proportional representation
    - Rural-urban proportional representation
- Suffrage
  - Disfranchisement
  - Right of foreigners to vote
  - Right of expatriates to vote in their country of origin
  - Youth suffrage
    - Age of candidacy
    - Demeny voting
  - Wasted vote
- Voting
  - Compulsory voting
  - Electronic voting
  - None of the above
  - Secret ballot
- Game theory
- Political campaign
- Political communications
- Political qualifications

=== Order of succession ===
- Primogeniture

=== Sortition ===
- Citizens' assembly

== Political institutions ==
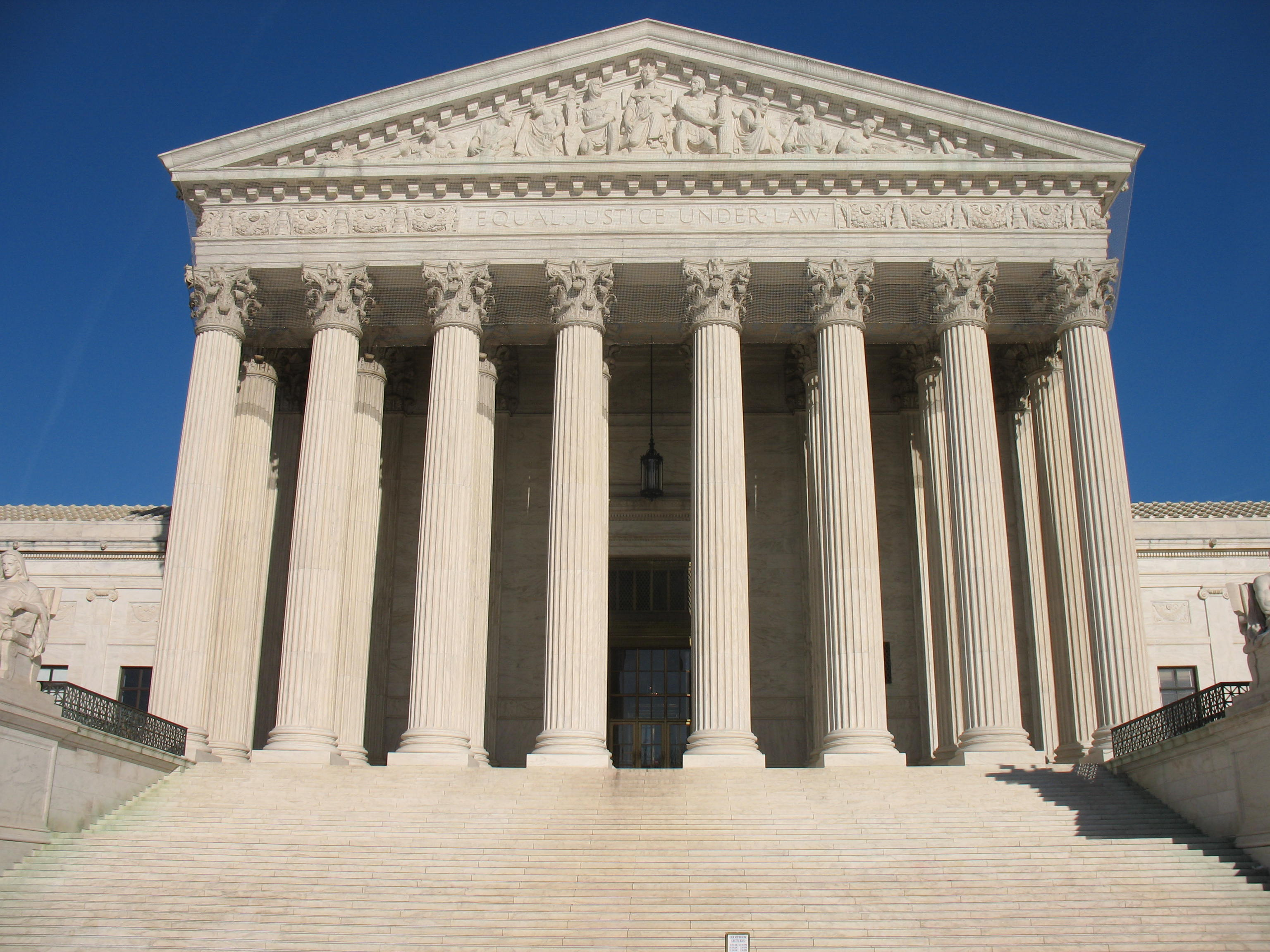
Institutions are often the framework within which politics happens. Pictured is the Supreme Court of the United States.

=== Government ===
- Government
- Legitimacy
- Authority
  - Tripartite classification of authority
    - Traditional authority
    - Charismatic authority
    - Rational-legal authority
- Rule of law
- Constitution
- State (polity), a centralized political organization that regulates law and society within a territory.
  - Sovereign state, a sovereign polity in international law, commonly referred to as a country.
    - Microstate, a sovereign state having a very small population or land area, usually both.
    - Multinational state, sovereign entity that comprises two or more nations or states.
  - Nation state, a state where the majority identify with a single nation (with shared culture or ethnic group)
  - Constituent state, a political subdivision of a state.
  - Federated state, constituent states part of a federation.
  - Fragile state, characterized by weak state capacity or weak state legitimacy leaving citizens vulnerable.
  - Failed state, a state which has lost its ability to fulfill fundamental security and development functions, lacking effective control over its territory and borders.
  - Vassal state, any state that has a mutual obligation to a superior state or empire.
  - Buffer state, a country geographically lying between two rival or potentially hostile great powers.
  - Stateless nation, an ethnic group or nation that does not possess its own sovereign state.

=== Branches of government ===
The separation of powers is typically set in the constitution or basic law in order to achieve checks and balances within government. The typical model has three branches, and is referred to as the trias politica.

- Legislature, deliberates and passes laws.
  - Unicameralism
  - Bicameralism
    - Upper house
    - Lower house
  - Tricameralism
  - Tetracameralism
  - Multicameralism
- Executive, executes laws.
  - Head of state, formal, often symbolic, leader of state. Sometimes has veto power over proposed legislation.
    - Monarch
    - President
  - Head of government, the person(s) in charge of day-to-day affairs of the state. Usually heads a cabinet, a Council of Ministers or a Council of State.
    - Chancellor
    - Chief executive
    - Chief minister
    - First minister
    - Premier
    - Prime minister
- Judiciary, often involved in politics through judicial review.
  - Supreme court
  - Constitutional court

Political parties, and their number, are important aspects of representative systems. The number of political parties in the Hellenic Parliament of Greece has varied across time.

=== Political parties ===
- Party systems
  - Nonpartisan democracy
  - One-party state
  - Dominant-party system
  - Two-party system
  - Multi-party system
  - Effective number of parties
  - Party discipline
  - Political factions
- Party coalition governments
  - Hung parliament
  - Confidence and supply
  - Minority government
  - Rainbow coalition
  - Grand coalition
  - National unity government
  - Majority government

== Political behavior ==
=== Theories of political behaviour ===
- Political culture
  - Civic political culture
  - Parochial political culture
  - Patrimonialism, a political culture which sees no difference between personal and political power.
    - Neopatrimonialism
    - Prebendalism
- Peace and conflict studies
  - Aggressionism
  - Greed versus grievance
- Political psychology
  - Impressionable years hypothesis
  - Postmaterialism
  - Right-Wing Authoritarianism
  - Social Dominance Orientation
  - System Justification Theory

=== Political strategy ===
- Accelerationism
- Political campaigning
  - Campaign advertising
  - Campaign finance
  - Campaign management tools
  - Canvassing
  - Grassroots fundraising
  - Smear campaign
  - Opposition research
  - Push poll
  - Retail politics
- Power politics
  - Balance of power
  - Bandwagoning
  - Blackmail
  - Brinkmanship
  - Buck passing
  - Coercion
  - Hard power
  - Sharp power
  - Soft power
  - Smart power
  - Power projection
  - Power vacuum
  - Realpolitik
- Cloward–Piven strategy
  - Starve the beast
- Propaganda
  - Disinformation
  - Fearmongering
  - Framing
  - Indoctrination
  - Loaded language
  - Lying press
  - National mythology
  - Rally 'round the flag effect

=== Voting behavior ===
- Abstention
- Abstentionism
  - Election boycott
- Economic voting
- Altruism theory of voting
- Coattail effect
- Split-ticket voting
  - Straight-ticket voting
- Tactical voting
  - Vote pairing
- Paradox of voting
- Protest vote
  - Spoilt vote
  - Voter apathy

== Political dysfunction ==
- Political conflict
  - Civil disobedience
    - Boycott
    - Demonstration
    - Nonviolence
    - Picketing
    - Strike action
    - Tax resistance
  - Civil war
    - Wars of national liberation
  - Insurgency
    - Asymmetric warfare
    - Assassination
    - Guerrilla warfare
  - Law of war
    - International criminal law
    - Just war theory
    - War crime
  - Revolution
    - Bourgeois revolution
    - Communist revolution
    - Democratic revolution
    - Nonviolent revolution
    - Social revolution
    - Political revolution (Trotskyism)
    - Vanguardism
    - World revolution
  - Terrorism
    - Nationalist-separatist terrorism
    - Propaganda of the deed
    - Religious extremist terrorism
    - Right-wing terrorism
    - Left-wing terrorism
- Political corruption
  - Bribery
  - Cronyism
  - Economics of corruption
  - Nepotism
  - Political patronage
    - Clientelism
    - Earmark
    - Political machine
    - Pork barrel
    - Slush fund
    - Spoils system

== Types of polities and forms of government ==
=== By level of social organisation ===
- Traditional authority, political society which has not gone through state formation.
  - Band society
  - Big man
  - Chiefdom
  - Empire (before New Imperialism).
- Local government
- Unitary state (Unitarism)
  - City-state
  - Nation state
- Federalism
  - Confederation
  - Federation
- Regional integration
  - Intergovernmental organization
  - Supranational union
    - European Union (European studies)
  - Trade bloc
- Global governance
  - World state

=== By formal power structure ===
- Feudalism
  - Chinese feudalism
  - Indian feudalism
- Monarchy/Diarchy
  - Absolute monarchy
  - Constitutional monarchy
  - Elective monarchy
  - Federal monarchy
- Republic
  - Parliamentary system
    - Westminster system
  - Presidential system
    - Semi-presidential system
    - President for life

=== By source of power ===
- Autocracy, the source of power is the leader.
- Democracy, the source of power are the people through popular sovereignty.
- Ethnocracy, the source of power is ethnicity.
- Meritocracy, the source of power is talent.
  - Noocracy, talent is measured by wisdom.
  - Technocracy, talent is measured by expertise.
- Stratocracy, the source of power is the military.
  - Military dictatorship
  - Military junta
- Theocracy, the source of power is God(s).
  - Christian republic
  - Halachic state
  - Hindu nation
  - Islamic state
- Oligarchy, the source of power is the elite.
  - Aristocracy, the elite are hereditary.
  - Gerontocracy, the elite are the elderly.
- Plutocracy, the source of power is wealth.

== Political ideologies and philosophies ==
- Authoritarianism
  - Absolutism
  - Totalitarianism
- Left-wing politics, usually focused on increasing egalitarianism.
  - Far-left politics
    - Anarchism
    - Communism
      - Autonomism
      - Dengism
      - Leninism
      - Maoism
      - Marxism–Leninism
      - Stalinism
      - Titoism
      - Trotskyism
  - Socialism
    - Agrarian socialism
    - Democratic socialism
    - Liberal socialism
    - Libertarian socialism
    - Market socialism
    - Marxist socialism (Scientific)
    - Religious socialism
    - Scientific socialism
    - Social democracy
  - Centre-left politics
    - Gradualism
    - Progressivism
    - Reformism
  - Green politics
    - Green anarchism
    - Ecofeminism
    - Eco-socialism
- Centrism, usually defined by highly pragmatic politics.
  - Radical centrism
  - Syncretic politics
  - Third Position
  - Third Way
- Liberalism, defined by high valuing of liberty.
  - Classical liberalism
  - Conservative liberalism
  - Neoliberalism
  - Social liberalism
  - Modern liberalism (in the United States)
- Right-libertarianism, often defined as high valuation of private property
  - Paleolibertarianism
  - Minarchism
  - Anarcho-capitalism
- Right-wing politics, often defined by opposition to social change, and a veneration of tradition.
  - Centre-right politics
    - Christian democracy
    - Compassionate conservatism
    - Liberal conservatism
    - One-nation conservatism
    - Progressive conservatism
  - Conservatism
    - Fiscal conservatism
    - Fusionism
    - Libertarian conservatism
    - National conservatism
    - Neoconservatism
    - Paleoconservatism
    - Social conservatism
    - Traditional conservatism
  - Far-right politics, political ideas which are described as reactionary, ultranationalist, chauvinistic, xenophobic or racist.
    - Alt-right
    - Fascism
    - Nazism
- Identity politics, political ideologies concerned with the interests of the members of a specific group.
  - Black power
  - Feminism
  - Gay pride
  - Indigenism
  - Islamism
  - Nationalism, based on the centrality of the nation.
    - Civic nationalism
    - Ethnic nationalism
    - Expansionist nationalism
    - Irredentism
    - Pan-nationalism
    - Racial nationalism
    - Left-wing nationalism
    - Liberal nationalism
    - Territorial nationalism
    - Secessionism
  - Zionism
- Environmentalism

== Political issues and policies ==
=== Rights ===
- Animal rights
- Civil and political rights, usually related to topics of negative liberty.
  - Freedom of assembly
  - Freedom of association
  - Right to asylum
  - Freedom from discrimination
  - Freedom of education
  - Freedom of information
  - Freedom of movement
  - Freedom of speech
  - Freedom of the press
  - Freedom of thought
  - Right to petition
  - Right to protest
  - Right to property
  - Freedom of religion
  - Right to life
- Economic, social and cultural rights, usually cover issues of positive liberty.
  - Digital rights
  - Labor rights
    - Equal pay for equal work
  - Right to an adequate standard of living
  - Right to clothing
  - Right to development
  - Right to education
  - Right to food
  - Right to health
  - Right to housing
  - Right to Internet access
  - Right to science and culture
  - Right to social security
  - Right to water
  - Right to work
- LGBT rights
- Minority rights
  - Affirmative action
- Women's rights
  - Abortion law

=== Economic policy ===
- Agricultural policy
  - Agricultural subsidy
  - Land reform
- Energy policy
  - Nuclear energy policy
  - Renewable energy policy
- Fiscal policy
  - Budgetary policy
- Industrial policy
  - Import substitution industrialization
- Investment policy
  - Sovereign wealth fund
- Monetary policy
  - Capital requirement
  - Central bank
  - Contractionary monetary policy
  - Expansionary monetary policy
- Tax policy
  - Internet taxation
  - Tax cut
  - Tax competition
  - Tax holiday
  - Tax reform
    - Flat tax
    - Tax harmonization

=== Foreign and security policy ===
- Arms control
  - Nuclear disarmament
    - Nuclear-free zone
    - Nuclear nonproliferation
- Criminal justice
  - Capital punishment
  - Life imprisonment
  - Mandatory sentencing
- Space policy
  - Extraterrestrial real estate
  - Militarization of space
    - Space force
- Counter-terrorism
  - Anti-terrorism legislation
- International Trade
- Military policy
  - Military recruitment
    - Conscription
  - Military-industrial complex

=== Social policy ===
- Cultural policy
  - Arts council
- Environmental policy
  - Climate change policy
  - Fisheries management
- Drug policy
  - Drug decriminalization
  - Drug policy reform
  - Harm reduction
  - Legality of cannabis
  - Legal status of cocaine
  - Legal drinking age
  - Legal status of methamphetamine
  - Legal status of psilocybin mushrooms
  - Legal status of Salvia divinorum
- Education policy and reform
  - Education reform
- Immigration
  - Family reunification
  - Immigration equality
  - Immigration of felons
  - Immigration law
  - Immigration reform
  - Open border
  - Permanent residency
  - Work permit
- Race relations
  - Affirmative action
  - Institutional racism
  - Racial profiling
  - White privilege
- Religion and politics
  - Separation of church and state
- Health policy
  - Legality of euthanasia
  - Stem cell controversy
  - Universal healthcare
  - Health care reform
- Welfare state
  - Guaranteed minimum income
  - Job guarantee
  - Welfare reform
  - Unemployment benefits
  - Universal Basic Income
  - Workfare

== History of politics ==
- History of political science
- History of political thinking
- Political history
  - List of years in politics

== Political scholars ==
- List of political scientists
- List of political philosophers
  - List of social and political philosophers
- List of political theorists

== Influential literature ==
- The Art of War – by Sun Tsu (c. 544–496 BC)
- History of the Peloponnesian War by Thucydides (c. 460 – c. 400 BC)
- The Republic and Laws – by Plato (427–347 BC)
- The Politics and Nicomachean Ethics – Aristotle (384–322 BC)
- Arthashastra – Chāṇakya (c. 350–283 BC)
- Meditations – Marcus Aurelius, Roman Emperor 161–180 CE
- The Prince – by Niccolò Machiavelli (1469–1527)
- The Book of Five Rings – Miyamoto Musashi (c. 1584––1645)
- Leviathan – Thomas Hobbes (1588–1679)
- The Wealth of Nations – by Adam Smith (1723–1790)
- On War – by Carl von Clausewitz (1780–1831)
- The Communist Manifesto – by Karl Marx (1818–1883)
- A Theory of Justice – by John Rawls (1921–2002)

== See also ==
- Anthropology
- Constitutional economics
- Debate
- Food politics
- Government simulation game
- Music and politics
- Policy
- Rule According to Higher Law
- Office politics
- Official statistics
- Organizational politics
- Political activism
- Political corruption
- Political criticism
- Political economy
- Political fiction (list)
- Political movement
- Political party (list by country)
- Political power
- Political psychology
- Theories of Political Behavior
