= Indian soft power in Africa =

In response to the limitations of hard power, some countries, including India, have increasingly incorporated soft power into their foreign policy, particularly in relations with developing nations. In 1950, Indian Prime Minister Jawaharlal Nehru advocated for the integration of the Indian diaspora into African nations; however, in the 1990s, following the end of the Cold War, India's foreign policy underwent a fundamental reassessment of the diaspora's role, utilizing these expatriate communities as a key element of soft power to elevate its global image.

== Indian cinema ==
Since the early 20th century, Indian films have helped communities, especially in Africa, connect with their culture, offering insights into social values, fashion, and food at a time when travel to India was expensive. Scholars like Daya Kishan Thussu and Shashi Tharoor discuss Indian cinema as a form of 'soft power,' using culture to engage with international audiences. This approach has been used in India's foreign policy to strengthen ties with African countries and share Indian culture.

== The Indian diaspora in Africa ==
Between 1829 and 1924, around 769,437 Indians migrated to Mauritius, South Africa, Reunion, Seychelles, and East Africa. Today, the Indian diaspora spans 46 African countries, representing 12.48% of India's total diaspora population. The widespread presence of the Indian diaspora in Africa has played a role in shaping India's influence in the region.

From 2002 to 2012, around $64 billion in investment flowed from Africa to India, with Mauritius—a nation with over 60% of its population of Indian descent—being the largest direct investor in India due to its favorable tax legislation and strong ties to the Indian diaspora. Indian-origin professionals hold important decision-making positions in African governments and businesses, such as Pravin Gordhan in South Africa and Navinchandra Ramgoolam in Mauritius, illustrating the involvement of the diaspora in New Delhi's African policy and bilateral relations.

== Cultural diplomacy ==
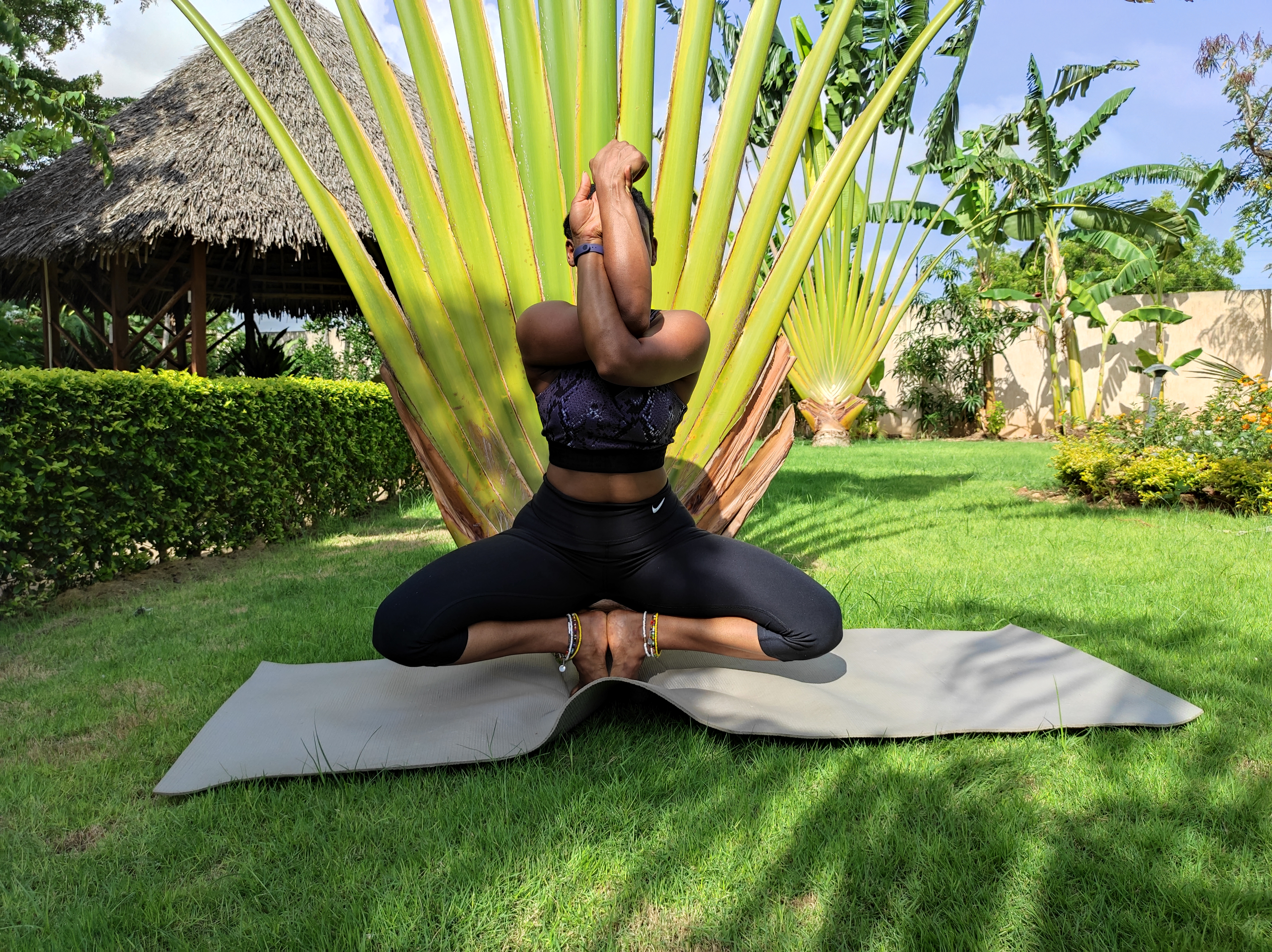
This image shows a woman practicing Gorakshasana in a garden, highlighting the practice of Yoga in Africa.

India's cultural heritage includes traditional medicine, such as Ayurveda and yoga, which are practiced in various countries.

India's soft power includes the global promotion of Yoga, reflecting its cultural heritage and contributing to international relations. The establishment of International Day of Yoga by the UN highlights Yoga's role in India's cultural diplomacy efforts. Yoga has been used in India's cultural diplomacy and recognized in both regional and international contexts.

== See also ==
- Africa–India relations
- Cultural diplomacy
