= Perestroika (disambiguation) =

Perestroika was a series of political and economic reforms of the Soviet Union in the 1980s by Soviet leader Mikhail Gorbachev.

Perestroika may also refer to:

- Angels in America: Perestroika, the title of the second part of Angels in America: A Gay Fantasia on National Themes, a 1993 play in two parts by American playwright Tony Kushner
- Perestroika (video game), a 1990 Russian video game
- Perestroika (film), 2009 drama film directed and written by Slava Tsukerman
- Perestroika Movement (political science)
- In mathematics, a perestroika is an abrupt change in a continuous system
