= Economics of corruption =

Field of study

Economics of corruption deals with the misuse of public power for private benefit and its economic impact on society. This discipline aims to study the causes and consequences of corruption and how it affects the economic functioning of the state.

Economies that are afflicted by a high level of corruption are not capable of prospering as fully as those with a low level of corruption. Corrupted economies cannot function properly since the natural laws of the economy are distorted. As a consequence, corruption, for instance, leads to an inefficient allocation of resources, poor education, and healthcare or the presence of a shadow economy - which includes illegal activities and unreported income from legal goods and services that should be taxed but are not.

One of the challenges of studying corruption lies is its definition. This might appear as a minor detail, but how we define corruption affects the way we model it and how we measure it. Although there are many definitions of what corruption is, most of them overlap over the central issue - "the misuse of public office power for personal gain in an illegal manner". Certain illegal activities such as fraud, money laundering, drug trade, and black market operations, do not necessarily amount to corruption if they do not involve the use of public power (bureaucracy). Another viable definition is as follows: corruption is an “arrangement” that involves “a private exchange between two parties (the ‘demander’ and the ‘supplier’), which (1) has an influence on the allocation of resources either immediately or in the future, and (2) involves the use or abuse of public or collective responsibility for private ends.”

The pervasiveness of corruption is a probabilistic measure and refers to the likelihood that an entering firm will encounter corruption in its dealings with government officials or politicians in the host country. A high level of pervasiveness indicates that firms are more likely to encounter corruption when undertaking normal business activities.

The study distinguishes two types of corruption: 1. Extortion: The demand of an official for a bribe under threat of harmful actions, or put him in such conditions under which he is forced to give a bribe in order to prevent harmful consequences for his law enforcement interest. 2. Collusion: When an authorized person takes a bribe for something they should not do, with both parties interested in the outcome.

The real damage from such corruption is often difficult to measure and can be many times more than officially reported figures.

Research on corruption faces a significant empirical obstacle – measurement. Corruption, by its nature, is illicit and secretive. Large portion of corruption is never discovered or prosecuted. Despite this challenge, researchers have made progress in addressing the level of corruption by attempting to measure the perception of corruption, rather than corruption itself.

As such, one way to objectively measure corruption is by counting the number of criminal indictments for corruption. However, this can be ineffective because the ratio of indictments to actual corruption may be highly variable. Often corruption goes unpunished and is thus not counted in this measure. Subjective measures, typically curated via survey data, may be a useful tool to measure corruption. Comparisons between countries may be more comprehensive and consistent, though a fair amount of bias is present in this data as well due to the nature of the subject it measures.

The International Country Risk Guide is a survey of firms on the likelihood they will be asked to make illegal or extralegal payments. The Corruption Perceptions Index is a detailed survey incorporating data from many nations and groups. Finally, the World Bank produces an annual "control of corruption" index that uses similar sources to the International Country Risk Guide and Corruption Perception Index.

== History of the discipline ==
In 1968, Nobel laureate economist Gunnar Myrdal found corruption 'almost a taboo (among economists) as research topic'. Indeed, it has mostly been a matter of political science, public administration, criminal law and sociology. However, the scenario changed since the 1970s. Since Rose-Ackerman's article "The Economics of Corruption", published in the Journal of Public Economics in 1975, more than 3,000 articles have been written with 'corruption' in the title, at least 500 of which directly focus on different aspects relating to corruption using an economic framework. Some books have also been published on the subject.

One of the impulses for economists to turn their attention to this subject was corruption's increasingly evident connection to economic performance. This impulse, among other, came in the 1990s from the transforming former socialist economies of countries that used to be part of the Soviet Union. The sudden changes in their command structures led to chaotic economic, political and social changes. This absence of the rule of law and surveillance led to rent-seeking, corruption and outright thievery. Nevertheless, a healthy regulatory environment, transparent government institutions and protection of property and investor rights were important for improving efficiency in newly created market economies. While some countries managed to quickly orient themselves and adjust to the formation of a new economy, others took much longer.

Much of the research on corruption has also been conducted at the IMF and the World Bank. This was prompted by global economic integration and globalization, which increased pressure on countries to be more transparent and accountable.

Another factor in the growth of interest in the topic was the spread of democratic values in the late 1980s and 1990s. Although democratic states are not necessarily protected from corruption, they contribute to the formation of a vigilant civil society.

Only in the 1990s was the awareness of the costs of corruption widespread and first indicators measuring the level of corruption were constructed used in empirical studies.

Early research mainly focused on shortcomings in economic policies and public institutions that allowed rent-seeking by public officials. In the early stages, some publications have pointed out positive effects of corruption. The argument about the benefits of corruption in the economic literature is usually attributed to Nathaniel Leff, who believed that if government intervention in the economy has the "wrong" goals or uses the wrong methods, then corruption, which allows to circumvent or somehow neutralize this interference, is useful. For example, if firms bribe tax inspectors and reduce their tax payments in a country whose government spends all taxes on its own needs and takes them offshore. The problem with this logic is that "improper" regulation arises endogenously, precisely in order to increase corrupt payments. Since the time of Leff, the economic policy of regulation in the world has improved, so the strength of this argument is lost.

== Corruption in the public and private sectors: the case of transition economies ==
One central question in the economics of corruption asks whether corruption is confined solely to the public sector, or whether it can equally stem from the private sector. What gives rise to this debate is the very definition of ‘corruption’. On the one hand, some economists understand corruption as the practice of exploiting public offices for personal gain. This opinion is shared by scholars Jain and Aidt. On the other hand, several international organizations understand corruption as the practice of exploiting power for personal gain: however, the power can stem from both the public and private sectors. For instance, The UN office on Drugs and Crimes stresses that corruption ‘can occur in both the public and private domains’, and the Global Program Against Corruption (GPAC) perceives corruption as the ‘an abuse of public power for private gain that hampers the public interest’.

As such, there seems to be a consensus that the purpose of corruption is to maximize personal gain, however, a discussion is possible regarding whether this purpose is achieved in the public and/or private sectors. It could be argued that defining corruption as the practice of exploiting public power is a misleading approach. While the mainstream economists suggest that corruption can be tackled by reducing the state's economic role, evidence from transnational economies suggests otherwise. For instance, in post-Soviet Eastern Europe and Russia privatization efforts attempted to diminish state involvement in economic affairs, however, the outcome of this approach was the increased corruption due to the newly developed avenues for illicit practices among state officials.

As such, one critique of privatization is that it gives rise to corruption. The level of corruption in a given country can be measured by the Corruption Perception Index (CPU) which measured the degree to which public power is perceived to be exploited for private gain. CPI ranges from 0 to 100, where an index of 0 signifies a highly corrupt state, and an index of 100 signifies a corruption-free state. Furthermore, the diagrams suggest a positive correlation between CPI and the Human Development Index (HDI). As such, HDI is associated with low levels of perceived corruption. Given that a number of transition economies classifies as ‘developing’ economies with relatively low HDI ranks, it can be argued that the and low CPIs. In Russia, privatization occurred through the ‘Loans-for-Share’ scheme which allowed state-owned companies to be leased through auctions to private individuals. Given that the auctions were rigged, a number of arbitrary restrictions were placed in order to limit competition. For instance, Surgutneftegaz conducted its auction in a remote Siberian location and is claimed to have orchestrated the closure of the local airport. Consequently, this scheme enabled a select group of well-connected oligarchs to accumulate vast wealth and economic influence by acquiring these state assets at discounted prices. This created an environment of corruption that permeated Russia's economic and political landscape. As such, throughout the 1990s, the so-called ‘Semibankirschina’, comprising the seven most influential oligarchs, effectively orchestrated economic and political activities in their own vested interests. These examples illustrate that corruption is not solely confined to the public sector. Therefore, corruption cannot be countered solely by eliminating or diminishing the public sector.

== Most corrupt countries ==
It has been proven that countries with relatively low levels of GDP per capita tend to have higher corruption levels. In addition, countries that developed early tend to have lower corruption scores. This may be due to the strong relationship between political institutions and corruption: those with more democratic and inclusive institutions tend to be less corrupt. For example, countries that have parliamentary democracies seem to have higher levels of corruption than democratically elected presidents. Note that this effect may be skewed by historical evidence from Latin America. Closed-list and proportional election systems may also breed more corruption than open-list electoral rules. High levels of legal formalism and regulation, as well as large natural resource endowments, are also correlated with higher levels of corruption.

=== The top 10 most corrupted countries ===
Below is a table showing 10 most corrupted countries. The data is taken from the page of the association Transparency International. They update the Index for most UN countries every year. The data below are taken for the year 2023.

Since most corruption is clandestine, the extent of corruption can be hardly quantified. The level of corruption perception is measured instead. This metric evaluates the (dis)honesty of political and economic institutions in the country. The numbers are indicators of the corruption perception index, which shows estimates of the level of perception of corruption by experts and entrepreneurs on a one-hundred-point scale. Lower numbers mean higher level of perceived corruption.

Country	Corruption Perception Index Score
Somalia	11
Syria	13
South Sudan	13
Venezuela	13
Yemen	16
North Korea	17
Nicaragua	17
Haiti	17
Equatorial Guinea	17
Turkmenistan	18

The political situation in these countries isn't stable or democratic. Moreover, many of these countries are viewed as one of the poorest in the world

Somalia was named the most corrupt country, where corruption even penetrated the central bank. A significant part of the funds is withdrawn from it for the private purposes of officials. The second most corrupt country is Syria. The country is struggling with appalling conditions due to the war, and corruption is rampant in all spheres from the city authorities to the army, which further worsens the standard of living of the population. The top four include South Sudan and Venezuela, where there is corruption at all levels and affects both top government officials and organizations and lower-level employees.

== Corruption cost estimates ==
It is very difficult to measure actual costs of corruption for it is an illegal activity where usually one of the sides of the deal is a public official. Thus, corruption tends to remain hidden from the eyes of the public. Nevertheless, there are some debates over its costs. However, there is no common consensus to what the value could approximately be or how it should be properly measured. Some global organizations present their estimates and other argue why they shouldn't be estimated at all.

To study the cost of corruption, it is important to define what is meant by that. Global Infrastructure Anti-Corruption Centre (GIAAC) defines the cost of corruption for a project as "the total loss and damage that is caused to all stakeholders by all corrupt activity on or in connection with the project." In the case of public sector, citizens are considered here as the stakeholders.

According to the United Nations and World Economic Forum, the estimated cost of global corruption is 5% of the GDP (~US$100 trillion in 2022). Hence, their estimate amounts to $5 trillion. Transparency International's estimate in 2019 was that the corruption costs developing $1.26 trillion per year. The Royal Institution of Chartered Surveyors estimated in 2021 that without significant interventions, up to $5 trillion could be lost every year in the international construction sector due to corruption.

However, developed countries such as the United States, Switzerland, Singapore and Liechtenstein are actively working to return corrupt assets to their countries of origin. Since 2010, countries have confiscated, seized and repatriated proceeds of corruption in the amount of $4.3 billion. Over the past 13 years, cross-border tracking of stolen assets and the impositions of restrictions on them has become a much more common practice.

On the other hand, many prominent voices in the anticorruption community called out the methodological soundness and usefulness of such estimates. Many flaws were found on the most cited global corruption statistics. A review has found out that these estimates rest on fragile foundantions and it said that the usage of the statistics should be avoided in high-level speeches and reports.

== Corruption and income inequality ==
The impact of corruption on income inequality was investigated by Gupta et al. (2002). They've found a significant positive impact of corruption on inequality while taking into account exogenous variables. Corruption has also an impact on income inequality through numerous channels, for instance - economic growth, biased tax system, asset ownership, etc.

Firstly, corruption can significantly affect the targeting of social problems. When the economy is corrupted, and government-funded programs are used to extend benefits to wealthy population groups or when poverty reduction funds are not used as they should because of corruption, the impact of social programs on income distribution could significantly diminish. Also, the higher corruption, the lower tax revenue, which results in lower resources for funding services such as education, etc.

Secondly, corruption can affect income inequality also through a biased tax system. Corruption can lead to poor tax administration or exemptions that could favor the wealthy ones with connections. As a result, the progressivity of the tax system could reduce; thus income inequality is possible.

A biased tax system is one that systematically favors or disadvantages certain groups, activities, or assets over others in the distribution of tax burdens or benefits. This can lead to inefficiencies, inequities, and distortions in economic decision-making and resource allocation. Such an example of taxation bias found in the article "Inattention and the Taxation bias", which arises from inattention to taxes and generates a time-inconsistency problem in the choice of tax policy, leading to higher taxes in equilibrium. These discretionary tax increases are inefficient as they are deviations from the socially optimal commitment policy, effectively leading to a larger income inequality coefficient.

Furthermore, when most of the asset is owned by elite groups of the population, they can take advantage of their wealth and lobby the government for favorable trade policies, which potentially could result in income inequality.

== Corruption and its effect on price ==
If the economy is corrupted, large companies with established connections to state offices and public officials have unfair advantage to small businesses through the ability to manipulate policies and market mechanisms. Such companies could then become a sole provider of goods or services. In other words, those companies could become a monopoly or oligopoly.

By definition, monopolies have no one to compete with and that creates many problems. For example, there is no supply curve for a monopolist. Thus, it is only upon them to set the price. This price tends to be unjustifiably high for the product the company sells. Additionally, as stated in the paragraph above, there is little to no chance for a new business to emerge on the market and help create a more competitive environment that sets the prices lower and incentivizes advancements.

In addition, large-scale corruption has an inflationary impact on the economy. This is due to the overestimation of the cost of public procurement, the need for additional expenses of firms for bribes. Such inflation is usually accompanied by a decrease in production levels and leads to a decrease in the standard of living of the population.

== Corruption and disincentive for innovation ==
In the articles devoted to the innovative development of the country, corruption is practically not considered as a factor related to innovation. Innovation activity, due to its specificity, is an unobservable variable. Many researches measure the level of innovation using patents. Potential inventors cannot be sure that their invention will be protected by patents and not copied by those who could bribe the authorities. That could be the reason why emerging countries usually import technology instead of innovating within their societies.

The most dangerous forms of corruption take place in countries with economies in transition, where weak institutions increase business costs. The business environment emerging in these conditions forces entrepreneurs interested in bringing innovations to the market to act in spite of bureaucratic obstacles. Thus, in developing countries, corruption is no longer considered an evil and is becoming the new norm, although in the long term its impact on the economy remains negative.

In his analysis, Marcelo Veracierto finds that small increases in the penalties to corruption or the effectiveness of detection can lead to jumps in the growth rate of the economy.

== Corruption and growth of GDP ==
Corruption breeds inefficiencies that may affect the static level of output. In order for corruption to affect economic growth as a whole, it must affect population growth, capital accumulation, or total factor productivity. A 1995 study by Paulo Mauro shows that capital accumulation, in the form of investment, is negatively correlated with corruption, particularly foreign direct investment. Because technological advances are primarily driven by investment, this correlation also reveals that corruption can negatively affect total factor productivity.

According to Pak Hung Mo, political instability is the most important channel through which corruption affects economic growth. This study shows that a 1% increase in the corruption level means that the growth rate is reduced by about 0.72%. In other words, a one-unit increase in the corruption index reduces the growth rate by 0.545 percentage points.

Furthermore, income inequality harms the economy. According to new OECD analysis, reducing income inequality would boost economic growth. For instance, Mexico's rising inequality knocked off more than 10 percentage points off growth over the past two decades up to the Great Recession. Besides, there are countries like Spain, France, and Ireland, where greater equality helped increase GDP per capita before the crisis.

The OECD study also finds evidence, that the main mechanism through which inequality affects growth is by undermining education opportunities for children from families with poor socioeconomic status, which measures a person's work experience and also a person's or family's economic and social position to others, which lowers social mobility.

== Corruption and its impact on the social spheres ==
Losses from corrupt bribes are measured not only in money, they directly or inderectly lead to poverty, undermine human rights and threaten security. According to the RA Anti-Corruption Strategy, healthcare, education, police, judiciary, prosecutors, tax and custom services are the most corrupted areas.

Corruption is detected when receiving both secondary and higher education. It can manifest itself in non-compliance with the established requirements for licensing and accreditation of educational institutions, bribery during exams and when hiring teachers. The injection of financial resources into educational programs that do not contribute to achieving the goals set leads to the fact that unskilled specialists who are unable to be adequately useful to the state and society enter the labor market.

In healthcare, corruption has a huge impact as well. Many things can be affected by corruption. For instance, the designation of healthcare providers, recruitment of personnel, or procurement of medical supplies and equipment. As a result, it leads to inadequate healthcare treatment and restricted medical supply, which results in lower quality of overall healthcare.

Corruption in the law enforcement sphere, and especially in criminal proceedings, is an extremely dangerous phenomenon for the state and society, which leads to the commission of crimes, has a negative impact on judicial proceedings and the objectivity of judicial decisions. The receipt of bribes by law enforcement officers affects the level of crime detection, the termination of criminal cases and other procedural decisions related to the release of perpetrators from criminal liability, as well as the falsification of materials. The corruption of law enforcement agencies differs from the corruption of other spheres of life in that those called upon to resist it affect the effectiveness of such counteraction and can reduce it to zero.

Not only does corruption lead to increased direct costs associated with public services, but it also leads to significant operational inefficiencies. In the example of education and healthcare sectors, corruption has been found to be linked to higher absenteeism rates among practitioners/professionals, as well as misallocated resources. These contribute to poorer outcomes in public health and education levels overall.

== Corruption and shadow economy ==
By definition, the unofficial economy constitutes activities that are not recorded in the government statistics. As such, the extent of the unofficial economy in a given country is hard to measure precisely. Furthermore, corruption is also an unofficial matter, therefore achieving a significant statistical analysis is difficult. However, in their research, Dreher & Schneider have found that in low income countries measured corruption increases with a larger shadow economy.

Many studies were carried on the relationship between corruption and the shadow economy However, the relationship is still not very clear. The majority of them found that corruption is associated with tax evasion, because of bribery of officials by entrepreneurs. In this case, corruption increases the shadow economy and lowers economic growth. For instance, studies that were carried by Johnson et al. (1997), Fjeldstad (1996, 2003), Buehn and Schneider (2009), and Kaufman (2010) revealed such empirical findings that showed a positive relationship between corruption and shadow economy.

However, in high-income countries, public goods are more efficient and only small businesses tend to pay bribes and avoid taxation. Consequently, the income generated by such businesses exists outside the official economy; therefore the income is not included in the calculation of the country's GDP. Such business not only pay their employees less than the minimum wage that is designed by the government in the country, but they also do not provide health insurance benefits and other employee benefits.

On the contrary, the big companies tend to bribe officials to get a contract from the public sector, which means, that the contract is conducted in the official sector. In consequence, the relationship between corruption and shadow economy has been found negative in high-income countries.

== Corruption and low foreign investment ==
Corruption is not unusual in international business; instead it can be a routine practise for investors, especially in developing countries. The subsidiaries of multinational enterprises (MNEs) are the main suppliers of bribes all over the world, and this has been long acknowledged by numerous International Organisations such as the OECD, the World Bank, the IMF and the UN. At the same time, MNEs are also recognised for their significant contribution to the fight against worldwide corruption.

MNEs often encounter corruption in their FDI, particularly when they enter emerging market economies. Corruption deters investment because it increases the direct costs and uncertainty of doing business. Further, in most nations, corruption is illegal. The consequent requirement for secrecy for business undertaken with corruption is risky since investors have limited protection from expropriation. As corruption is related to the degree of government regulation, it can be argued that level of government regulation has both a direct and indirect effect on FDI. The direct effect works through lowering the legal expenses of complying with regulatory procedures and red tape. The indirect effect works through the negative relationship between the burden of government regulation and corruption. As regulations are removed, the scope for corrupt activities shrinks, reducing the costs of operating in the host country.

However, some research states that corruption has gained prominence as the contacts between less corrupt and more corrupt countries has intensified in the last decade - therefore, stating that corruption does not seem to deter FDI in absolute terms. Nevertheless, it is argued that corruption does create certain distortions by providing some companies preferential access to profitable markets. There is another aspect related to corruption levels and FDI - the difference in corruption between the respective countries. The greater such differences between the two countries, the lower the likelihood that they will know how to deal mutually - given a choice between a familiar and a less familiar environment, firms will prefer the former.

In addition, Wei & Schleifer (2000) show that the attitude of the host government towards foreign firms in terms of foreign exchange controls, exclusion from strategic sectors, exclusion from other sectors and restrictions on ownership share would dramatically reduce the MNEs' incentive for FDI. On the other hand, industry and geographic incentives, tax concessions, non-tax concessions and export incentives for MNEs would encourage FDI.

In conclusion, some studies show that a higher level of corruption would discourage FDI stock for countries in the lower quantiles of the FDI distribution, whilst this negative effect cannot be found for countries in the top quantiles. This implies that in order to promote FDI governments should adopt different approaches conditional on the specific situation of their country. For instance, reducing corruption would be a particularly useful strategy for countries that have not been selected as FDI host countries before, but would be less efficient in promoting FDI stock if the country has already been chosen as FDI host country and is in the top quantiles of FDI stock distribution. Indeed, for those developing countries which may have low FDI, (such as Venezuela) controlling for corruption still should be viewed as a good strategy to attract FDI and the World Bank and TI's initiative to reduce corruption should be continuously pursued. However, for countries with a high level of corruption and FDI (such as China) reducing corruption would not necessarily induce higher FDI. This does not mean that controlling corruption in these countries is unimportant, but rather that it is still important for the country's social and political development rather than for the mere economic aspect of the matter.

== Inefficient allocation of resources ==
Corruption is often connected with tenders in the private but especially public sector. Ideally if there is a tender, the supplier with the best combination of price and quality is selected. If the winner of the tender is awarded fairly, then the allocation of the resources is efficient. However, in a corrupted economy, a supplier which should not win the tender is granted the project anyway. These tenders sometimes involve kickback. That is a process when an illegal payment is given as a compensation for preferential treatment. In the case of public tenders, a public official ensures that a certain party wins the tender even if their price is higher than competition's. Part of the money (kickback) is then paid back by the winner to the official responsible for this illegal activity as an acknowledgement for their service.

In nearly every case, corruption involved in public projects leads to inefficiences. Not only could it be possible to complete the same project with less costs but the quality of the product could be affected in a negative way as well. Corruption Watch's investigations warn how easy it is to tapmer tender processes. The reasons to this are for example the lack of transparency, complexity and the amount of procedures involved in the tender and the lack of advertising or circulating of a tender.

Due to inefficient use of resources, the state is forced to limit spending on the social sphere, as a result of which, taking into account inflation, total household incomes and expenses decrease.

== Combatting corruption on the micro level ==
According to Robert Klitgaard's equation, corruption = monopoly + discretion - accountability. Therefore, corruption is able to emerge and grow when there is a private or public monopoly over a good or service, and this individual or group has the discretionary power to allocate the good or service with few checks and balances and few, if any, consequences. By targeting individual components of the equation, there are several ways to fight corruption. First of all, reducing monopoly necessarily encourages competition. This may be accomplished by publishing public procurement data online or making government contracts available to a wider range of potential firms. Successful examples of this include the case of countries such as Mexico, which made all government contracts and procurement plans available online so the general public could view plans, prices, and bid winners. Secondly, limiting discretion means making laws and government procedures accessible for a broad cross-section of society to view. This may be accomplished by the publication of documents detailing legal requirements for acquiring permits etc. in common languages and in an accessible format. As well as providing open mechanisms for submitting complaints to interested parties to identify cases of fraud and conduct investigations, as necessary. Finally, increasing accountability may be accomplished by inviting impartial third parties to conduct government audits, as well as continually monitor and evaluate government procedures. This has been a success in countries such as Singapore or Hong Kong.

== Books on economics of corruption ==
Some books have been produced with the specific title of "economics of corruption". One of these is The Economics of Corruption edited by Ajit Mishra published by the Oxford University Press in 2005. This book is an anthology of 11 essays under 4 categories, written by 16 economists. The titles of the essays give an idea of the various approaches taken by different economists. They are quoted below :

- Corruption : an Overview
- Corruption : Its causes and Effects
- Hierarchies and Bureaucracies: On the role of Collusion in Organizations
- A Theory of Misgovernance
- Pervasive Shortages under Socialism
- Corruption and Growth
- Corruptible Law Enforcers : How should they be compensated?
- Notes on bribery and control of corruption
- The Choice between Market failures and corruption
- Rents, Competition and corruption
- Electoral competition and Special Interest Politics

One can observe that these essays do not capture corruption in all its economic essence. Hundreds of essays have been published during the last two decades that deal with many more aspects of corruption from an economic perspective. Some other books are :

- Rose-Ackerman, S. : Corruption - A study in Political Economy, 1978, Academic Press, New York.
- Ekpo, M. U. (ed.) : Bureaucratic corruption in sub-Saharan Africa, 1979, University Press of America, Washington.
- Noonan, J. T. Bribes, 1984, Macmillan, New York.
- Chowdhury, F. L. Corrupt Bureaucracy and Privatization of Tax Enforcement, 2006, Pathak Samabesh, Dhaka.
- Fisman, R. and Golden, M. : Corruption: What Everyone Needs to Know, 2017, Oxford University Press, New York.

== Courses on economics of corruption ==
Some universities and institutions including the University of Regina in Canada, Florida State University in the United States, and the University of Passau in Germany have started to offer courses on the economics of corruption. Additionally, the University of Rochester offers a course related to the history of economic corruption. One of the course outlines is given below. The course is offered by New Economic School, an institution in Russia. The course includes 14 lectures, the themes of which are as follows.

1. Corruption as an economic, social and political problem. Corruption's specific features in economies in transition.
2. Corruption and rent-seeking behavior. Basic model of rent-seeking and its research. Problem of rent's dissipation.
3. Static and dynamic models of Rent-seeking. Cases of pure and mixed public goods.
4. Rent-seeking behavior and free-riding. Rent-seeking in teams.
5. Rent-seeking in hierarchical systems.
6. "Artificial" rents and seeking for them.
7. Examples when rent-seeking arises in economies. Criminal rent-seeking.
8. Basil model of corruption and its analysis. Corruption models' classification.
9. Game-theoretical approaches towards corruption.
10. Corruption in hierarchical structures.
11. Dynamic corruption models.
12. Economic systems with corruption efficiency.
13. Statistical and econometrical approaches towards the research of corruption.
14. Macroeconomics aspects of corruption. Problems in the estimation of corruption influence on economic development.

== Approaches to economic analyses of corruption ==
A systematic pattern in research on corruption from an economic perspective is yet to emerge. However, Ananish Chaudhuri has classified the foci of economic analyses of corruption into fourteen broad categories. These are:

- Economic causes of corruption
- Rent-seeking in the public offices, including Judiciary
- Corruption as an economic behavior, e.g. game-theoretic explanation
- Demand for and Supply of corruption, the optimal level of corruption, the optimal level of bribery, the efficiency of the market in corruption
- Impact of corruption on the competitiveness in the market for goods and services
- Measurement of the level of corruption, comparative county-studies
- Corruption in different economic activities, e.g. public procurement, defense procurement
- Sources of corruption: Revenue collection, Foreign aid, Foreign Direct Investment
- Corruption in the private sector, Economies in transition
- Impact of corruption on economic growth, national development and the level of poverty
- Welfare impact of corruption, Income redistribution resulting from corruption
- Factors affecting corruption, e.g. Shadow economy, Smuggling, weak state, corruption by politicians
- Relation between corruption on the one hand and other economic-social-cultural aspects like technological progress, environment and ecology,
- Economic factors relating to anti-corruption programs, e.g. optimal level of punishment for corruption etc.

== See also ==
- ISO 37001 Anti-bribery management systems
- Group of States Against Corruption
- International Anti-Corruption Academy
- United Nations Convention against Corruption
- OECD Anti-Bribery Convention
