= Sharp power =

Type of power in international relations

Sharp power is the use of diplomatic and political manipulation by one country to influence and undermine the political system of a target country.

== History ==
The National Endowment for Democracy (NED) popularised the term "sharp power" (in use since the early 19th century) in November 2017; it appeared in an article in Foreign Affairs magazine describing aggressive and subversive policies employed by authoritarian governments as a projection of state power in democratic countries, policies that cannot be described as either hard power or soft power. The NED article specifically names the Russian state-funded RT News Network and the Chinese state-sponsored Confucius Institute educational partnerships as examples of sharp power. According NED, autocratic states "are not necessarily seeking to "win hearts and minds" (the common frame of reference for soft power efforts), but they are surely seeking to manipulate their target audiences by distorting the information that reaches them.

Since 2018 the term "sharp power" has been used in news articles, scholarly discussions, and Congressional hearings. Representatives of the Chinese Communist Party have used the phrase, dismissing Western claims that their country has engaged in sharp-power practices.

== Overview ==
Sharp power can include attempts by one country to manipulate and manage information about itself in the news media and educational systems of another country, for the purpose of misleading or dividing public opinion in a target country, or for masking or diverting attention away from negative information about itself.

Sharp power, as stated by Christopher Walker "takes advantage of the asymmetry between free and unfree systems, allowing authoritarian regimes both to limit free expression and to distort political environments in democracies while simultaneously shielding their own domestic public spaces from democratic appeals coming from abroad.”

Soft power policies can include student exchanges and the sponsoring of cultural and sporting events. Sharp power is distinguished from soft power, which are attractive policies that project a positive impression of one country and promote greater understanding with another country, ultimately to influence the decisions of another country through persuasion. Sharp power is also distinct from hard power, which are coercive policies by one country to compel another country into taking action or changing its decisions. Hard power can include military force, economic sanctions, and diplomatic threats.

Sharp power often has a digital element to it. In particular Chinese exercises in sharp power are carried out almost entirely online.

== See also ==
- Soft power
- Hard power
- Smart power
- Power projection
- Power (international relations)
- Power (social and political)
- Abusive power and control
- Political warfare
- Psychological warfare and propaganda
- Active measures
- Hostage diplomacy
