= Soft power =

Ability to co-opt rather than coerce

Soft power in politics, particularly in international politics, is the ability to influence or persuade others through the use of persuasive means, as opposed to the use of force or coercion, which is an aspect of hard power. This process entails the strategic shaping of others' preferences through the use of appealing, non-coercive, and attractive means, using culture, political values, and foreign policies to enact change. In 2012, Joseph Nye of Harvard University explained that with soft power, "the best propaganda is not propaganda", further asserting that during the Information Age, "credibility is the scarcest resource".

Nye popularised the term in his 1990 book, Bound to Lead: The Changing Nature of American Power. In this book he wrote: "when one country gets other countries to want what it wants might be called co-optive or soft power in contrast with the hard or command power of ordering others to do what it wants". He further developed the concept in his 2004 book, Soft Power: The Means to Success in World Politics.

== Explanation of concept ==
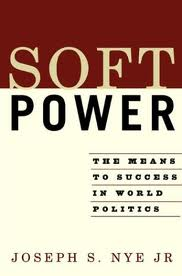
Joseph Nye's 2004 book describing the concept of "soft power"

The Oxford English Dictionary records the phrase "soft power" (meaning "power (of a nation, state, alliance, etc.) deriving from economic and cultural influence, rather than coercion or military strength") from 1985. The influential international relations scholar Joseph Nye popularized the concept of "soft power" in the late 1980s. For Nye, power is the ability to influence the behavior of others to get the outcomes you want. There are several ways one can achieve this: one can coerce others with threats; one can induce them with payments; or one can attract and co-opt them to want what one wants. This soft power – getting others to want the outcomes one wants – co-opts people rather than coerces them.

Soft power contrasts with "hard power" – the use of coercion and payment. Soft power can be wielded not just by states but also by all actors in international politics, such as NGOs or international institutions. It is also considered by some an example of the "second face of power" that indirectly allows one to obtain the outcomes one wants. A country's soft power, according to Nye, rests on three resources: "its culture (in places where it is attractive to others), its political values (when it lives up to them at home and abroad), and its foreign policies (when others see them as legitimate and having moral authority)."

"A country may obtain the outcomes it wants in world politics because other countries – admiring its values, emulating its example, aspiring to its level of prosperity and openness – want to follow it. In this sense, it is also important to set the agenda and attract others in world politics, and not only to force them to change by threatening military force or economic sanctions. This soft power – getting others to want the outcomes that you want – co-opts people rather than coerces them."

Soft power resources are the assets that produce attraction, which often leads to acquiescence. Nye asserts that, "Seduction is always more effective than coercion, and many values like democracy, human rights, and individual opportunities are deeply seductive." Angelo Codevilla observed that an often overlooked essential aspect of soft power is that different parts of populations are attracted or repelled by different things, ideas, images, or prospects. Soft power is hampered when policies, culture, or values repel others instead of attracting them.

In his book, Nye argues that soft power is a more difficult instrument for governments to wield than hard power for two reasons: many of its critical resources are outside the control of governments, and soft power tends to "work indirectly by shaping the environment for policy, and sometimes takes years to produce the desired outcomes." The book identifies three broad categories of soft power: "culture", "political values", and "policies."

In The Future of Power (2011), Nye reiterates that soft power is a descriptive, rather than a normative, concept. Therefore, soft power can be wielded for nefarious purposes. "Hitler, Stalin, and Mao all possessed a great deal of soft power in the eyes of their acolytes, but that did not make it good. It is not necessarily better to twist minds than to twist arms." Nye also claims that soft power does not contradict the international relations theory of realism. "Soft power is not a form of idealism or liberalism. It is simply a form of power, one way of getting desired outcomes."

Scholars of religion and international relations have extended the concept to religious soft power. Jeffrey Haynes, among the first to develop the idea beyond an abstract definition, argued that foreign-policy actors, whether secular or religious, seek to use religion as a force in pursuit of their goals. Ahmet Erdi Öztürk has argued that the effective use of religious soft power presupposes an organic historical connection with the religion concerned, so that even a state whose official ideology has changed may deploy religion in its foreign policy — Turkey, officially secular since the founding of the republic yet successor to the Ottoman role in the Islamic world, being a leading example.

== Limitations of the concept ==
Soft power has been criticized as being ineffective by authors such as Niall Ferguson in the preface to Colossus. Neorealist and other rationalist and neorationalist authors (with the exception of Stephen Walt) dismiss soft power out of hand as they assert that actors in international relations respond to only two types of incentives: economic incentives and force.

As a concept, it can be difficult to distinguish soft power from hard power. For example, Janice Bially Mattern argues that George W. Bush's use of the phrase "you are either with us or with the terrorists" was in fact an exercise of hard power. Though military and economic force was not used to pressure other states to join its coalition, a kind of force – representational force – was used. This kind of force threatens the identity of its partners, forcing them to comply or risk being labeled as evil. This being the case, soft power is therefore not so soft.

There are also recent articles about the concept's neglect of its defensive use. Since Nye's approach "mainly focuses on how to get others to do your bidding", some researchers argued that rising powers, such as China, are creating new approaches to soft power, thus using it defensively.

Additionally, others have argued that more attention needs to be paid towards locating and understanding how actors' attempts at soft power can backfire, leading to reputational damage or loss, or what has been termed 'soft disempowerment'.

Amit Kumar Gupta has written on what he regards as a flaw in the definition provided by Nye, and has made an effort to redefine the concept. Citing Nye's definition, the author writes that, "a country's behaviour in the international platform is not in the least determined by the other parties' attraction in soft power terms. Every country weighs its interest and follows its convictions before taking any decision." Gupta proposes the terms "positive soft power" and "negative soft power" to replace Nye's definition.

== Measurement ==
An initial undertaking to measure soft power through a composite index was published by the Institute for Government (IfG) and the media company Monocle in 2010. The IfG-Monocle Soft Power Index, created by then IfG senior researcher Jonathan McClory, combined a range of statistical metrics and subjective panel scores to measure the soft power resources of 26 countries. The metrics were organized according to a framework of five sub-indices including culture, diplomacy, education, business/innovation, and government. The index is said to measure the soft power resources of countries, and does not translate directly into ability influence. Monocle has published an annual Soft Power Survey since then. As of 2016/17, the list is calculated using around 50 factors that indicate the use of soft power, including the number of cultural missions (primarily language schools), Olympic medals, the quality of a country's architecture and business brands.

The Soft Power 30, which includes a foreword by Joseph Nye, is a ranking of countries' soft power produced and published by the media company Portland in 2015. The ranking is based on "the quality of a country's political institutions, the extent of their cultural appeal, the strength of their diplomatic network, the global reputation of their higher education system, the attractiveness of their economic model, and a country's digital engagement with the world."

The Elcano Global Presence Report scores the EU first for soft presence. Soft power, then, represents the third behavioral way of getting the outcomes you want. Soft power is contrasted with hard power, which has historically been the predominant realist measure of national power, through quantitative metrics such as population size, concrete military assets, or a nation's gross domestic product. But having such resources does not always produce the desired outcomes, as the United States discovered in the Vietnam War.

The success of soft power heavily depends on the actor's reputation within the international community, as well as the flow of information between actors. Thus, soft power is often associated with the rise of globalization and neoliberal international relations theory. Popular culture and mass media are regularly identified as a source of soft power, as is the spread of a national language or a particular set of normative structures. More particularly, international news was found crucial in shaping the image and reputation of foreign countries.

Brand Finance's
Global Soft Power 2026

Rank	Country
1	United States
2	China
3	Japan
4	United Kingdom
5	Germany
6	France
7	Switzerland
8	Canada
9	Italy
10	United Arab Emirates

ISSF's
World Soft Power Index 2026

Rank	Country
1	United States
2	France
3	China
4	Italy
5	United Kingdom
6	Germany
7	Spain
8	Japan
9	Switzerland
10	India

Monocle's
Soft Power Survey 2022

Rank	Country
1	United States
2	Denmark
3	France
4	South Korea
5	Switzerland
6	Japan
7	Germany
8	United Kingdom
9	Italy
10	Ukraine

IMF
Global Soft Power Index 2021

Rank	Country
1	South Korea
2	Japan
3	Germany
4	China
5	Italy
6	France
7	United States
8	United Kingdom
9	Spain
10	Switzerland

== Research ==
Academics have engaged in several debates around soft power. These have included:

- Its usefulness (Giulio Gallarotti, Niall Ferguson, Josef Joffe, Robert Kagan, Ken Waltz, Mearsheimer vs Nye, Katzenstein, Janice Bially Mattern, Jacques Hymans, Alexander Vuving, Jan Mellisen)
- How soft power and hard power interact (Giulio Gallarotti, Joseph Nye)
- How soft power can be operationalized (Hendrik W. Ohnesorge)
- Whether soft power can be coercive or manipulative, (Janice Bially Mattern, Katzenstein, Duvall & Barnet vs Nye, Vuving)
- How the relationship between structure and agency work (Hymans vs Nye)
- Whether soft balancing is occurring (Wohlforth & Brooks vs Walt et al..)
- Soft power and normative power in Europe (Ian Manners, A Ciambra, Thomas Diez, A Hyde Pryce, Richard Whitman)
- How civil resistance (i.e., non-violent forms of resistance) can often involve certain uses of soft power, but remains a distinct concept (Adam Roberts, Timothy Garton Ash)
- The role of personalities and charismatic leadership in soft power (Hendrik W. Ohnesorge)
- Soft power in U.S. foreign policy and transatlantic relations (Hendrik W. Ohnesorge)

== Examples ==
=== Worldwide ===
The Soviet Union competed with the U.S. for influence throughout the Cold War. The Soviets were engaged in a broad campaign to convince the world of the attractiveness of its Communist system. In 1945, the Soviet Union was very effective in attracting many in Europe from its resistance to Hitler, and in colonized areas around the world because of its opposition to European imperialism. The Soviets also employed a substantially large public diplomacy program that included: promoting their high culture, broadcasting, disseminating information about the West, and sponsoring nuclear protests, peace movements, and youth organizations. Despite all of this, the Soviets' closed system and lack of popular culture impeded the ability of the Soviet Union to compete with the U.S. in terms of soft power.

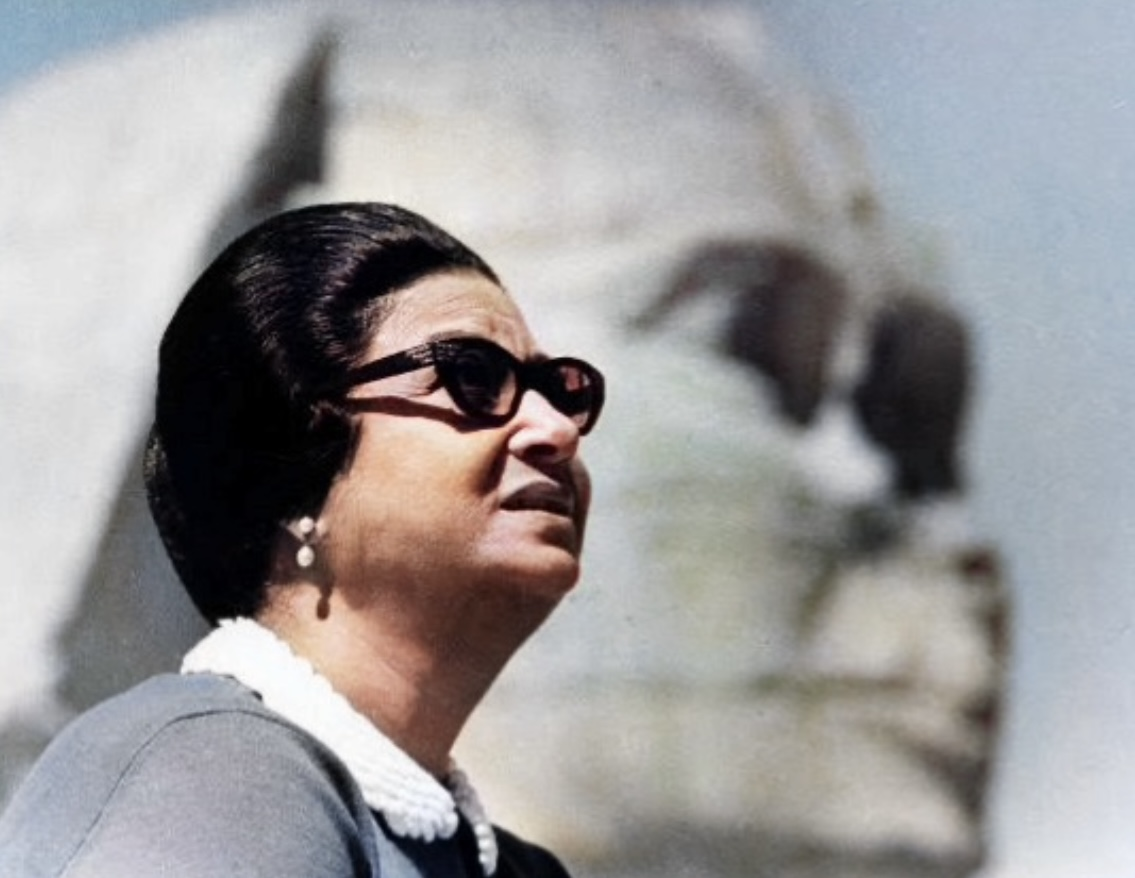
Umm Kulthum, example of Egypt's soft power in the 20th century Arab World

A number of non-democratic governments have attempted to use migration as an instrument of soft power: Egypt under the rule of Gamal Abdel Nasser trained and dispatched thousands of teachers across the Arab world in an effort to spread ideas of anti-colonialism and anti-Zionism. In Cuba, the Fidel Castro regime's medical internationalism programme has dispatched thousands of medical professionals abroad for cultural diplomacy purposes. The Chinese-sponsored Confucius Institutes across the world rely on Chinese teachers in order to strengthen the country's soft power abroad.

The United States and Europe have consistently been sources of influence and soft power. European culture's art, literature, music, design, fashion, and even food have been global magnets for some time. Europe and the U.S. have often claimed to support human rights and international law throughout the world. In 2012, the European Union was awarded the Nobel Peace Prize "for over six decades [it has] contributed to the advancement of peace and reconciliation, democracy and human rights in Europe." In 2019, the U.S. has the second largest diplomatic network in the world, the largest number of foreign journalists based in the country, and is the most popular destination for international students. American films, television, music, advertising, fashion, food, economic models, political culture, and literature have contributed to the Americanization of other cultures.

Asia and more recently China have been working to use the potential soft power assets that are present in the admiration of their ancient cultures, arts, fashion and cuisine. China is presenting itself as a defender of national sovereignty, which became an issue after the NATO air campaign to oust Colonel Muammar Gaddafi and NATO's support of the rebels in Libya. The Chinese are also competing with the United States to gain influence throughout the South Pacific, however some commentators have said their recent assertiveness in this region has created an appeal for nations in this region to align with the United States thus increasing U.S. soft power in this area.

Soft power extends beyond the operations of government, to the activities of the private sector and to society and culture at large. Soft power has gained more influence because it addresses the underlying dispositions of the people who have increasingly become more active in their governments. This is true even in authoritarian countries where people and institutions are increasingly able to shape the debate.

=== Australia ===
According to the Department of Foreign Affairs and Trade of the Commonwealth Government, Australia maintains a good reputation thanks to "its democracy, rule of law, strong economy, quality education, cutting-edge science, multiculturalism and environmental protections", enabling to its citizens and institutions to "speak with confidence and credibility in the world stage". Education has remained central to Australia's soft power, being one of the most recognized education powerhouses in the world with more than 700,000 international students enrolled. In 2023, Australia's nation branding was ranked as the world's ninth strongest according to the Nation Brand Index, which positions Australia as an attractive place for tourism and foreign investment: it perceives the world's eighth largest tourism receipts and it is the 16th largest FDI receptor.

=== Middle East ===
The Middle East has been an area in which soft power has been employed by both regional and outside actors. Small states, such as Qatar, frequently employ soft-power strategies, including the use of al-Jazeera and the hosting of sports events, in their foreign policymaking. Outside powers, such as the United States or China, also employ soft power in terms of expanding their influence across the Middle East. Competition amongst states of the Middle East often involves the use of soft power, as in the case of Egyptian-Israeli rivalry over Africa, or Saudi-Iranian relations.

=== Iran ===
Iran's soft power, driven by its Shia Islamic ideology, Iranian-Persian background, civilization and history, the legacy of the 1979 Iranian Revolution and Anti-Zionist stance exerts significant influence in the Middle East, the broader Islamic world, Central Asia, Africa and even the West. Central to this influence is the promotion of anti-imperialist, Islamic, and Shia ideologies like Khomeinism and political interpretation of Shia Islam, which have fostered strong ties with the Muslim world, especially countries in the "Axis of Resistance" such as Iraq, Syria, Lebanon, and Yemen that have led to the foundation of many Islamic and Shia groups such as Hezbollah in Lebanon, Islamic Resistance groups in Iraq, Islamic Jihad in Palestine and many others across the region. Iran also promotes the idea of a "Greater Iran," connecting culturally and ideologically with Persian-speaking nations like Tajikistan, Afghanistan, and Pakistan, where the Persian language plays a unifying role.

In the Islamic world, Iran's influence extends beyond its borders, particularly in countries of the Axis of Resistance and other countries like Bahrain, Saudi Arabia, and the Muslim world, where Shia communities often look to Iran for religious guidance and political inspiration, and some Sunnis support the Axis of Resistance and are attracted by Iran's anti-Israeli policies in countries like Palestine, Qatar and Syria. Iran's cultural and religious outreach, including media, educational exchanges, and religious diplomacy, strengthens its ties with Shia and Islamic populations worldwide. Iran's anti-imperialist and anti-colonial stance, rooted in the 1979 Islamic Revolution, is attractive to many. By positioning itself as a defender of sovereignty against U.S. influence, Iran resonates with anti-globalization movements and intellectuals critical of Western interventionism.

In Latin America, Iran's solidarity with anti-imperialist governments, like Venezuela, strengthens ties based on mutual resistance to U.S. domination, promoting a shared vision of self-determination. Iran's ideological message, combining anti-imperialism, Islamic and Shia values, Iranian cultural and historical roots, and cultural diplomacy, has made it a significant actor on the regional and world stage, inspiring and fostering relations with a diverse range of countries committed to challenging Western domination and promoting an alternative vision of global order.

=== China ===
China's traditional culture has been a source of attraction, building on which it has created several hundred Confucius Institutes around the world to teach its language and culture. The enrollment of foreign students in China has increased from 36,000 a decade before to at least 240,000 in 2010. China is the most popular country in Asia for international students, the leading destination globally for Anglophone African students, and the second most popular education powerhouse in the world. China's Asian Infrastructure Investment Bank has attracted many Western countries to join. China has the largest diplomatic network in the world, overtaking the US in 2019. The provision of Chinese medical aid during the COVID-19 pandemic has been dubbed "facemask diplomacy".

=== France ===
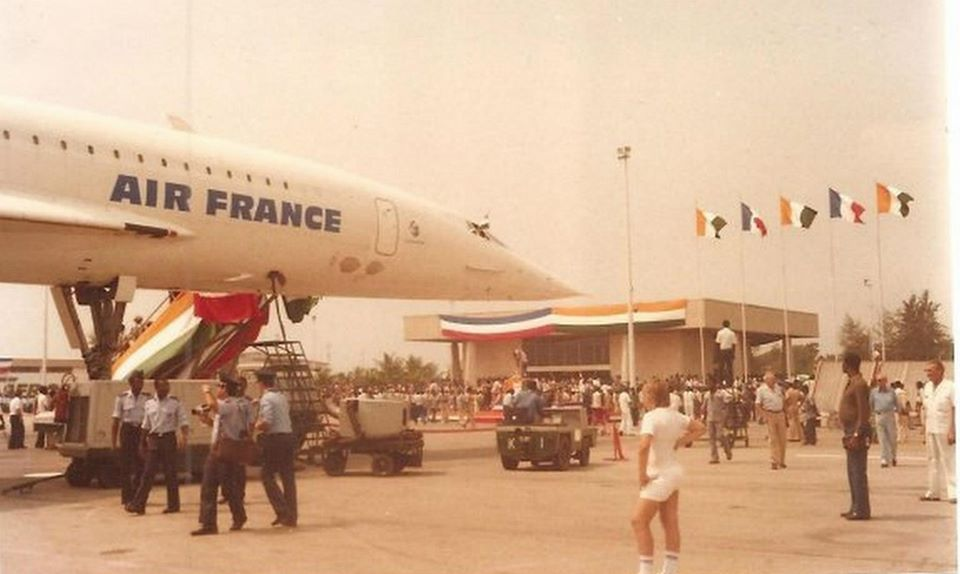
The supersonic jet Concorde arrives in Ivory Coast, a former French colony, in 1978. Concorde was often used as a symbol of French prestige and a vessel of soft power.

According to a 2018 study in the American Sociological Review, France had greater influence on European geopolitics than Britain in the 18th century because of its cultural and symbolic power.

=== Germany ===
The annual soft power rankings by Monocle magazine and the Institute for Government ranks 30 countries which "best attract favor from other nations through culture, sport, cuisine, design, diplomacy and beyond." Monocle magazine said: "Merkel may be painted as a stern taskmaster but it seems she has a softer side, or the country she leads does." It said Germany's rise as a soft power should not come as a surprise. "The country is traditionally excellent at pursuing its ideas, values and aims using diplomatic, cultural and economic tools," it said. "By quietly doing the simple things well it is a country that has become a global power and the rest of us can feel comfortable with that." Germans had been understandably wary about depicting a dominant image abroad, the magazine added, but it said that the country's rise should not make everyone else feel uncomfortable. In 2017, Germany had the eighth largest diplomatic network in the world.

=== India ===
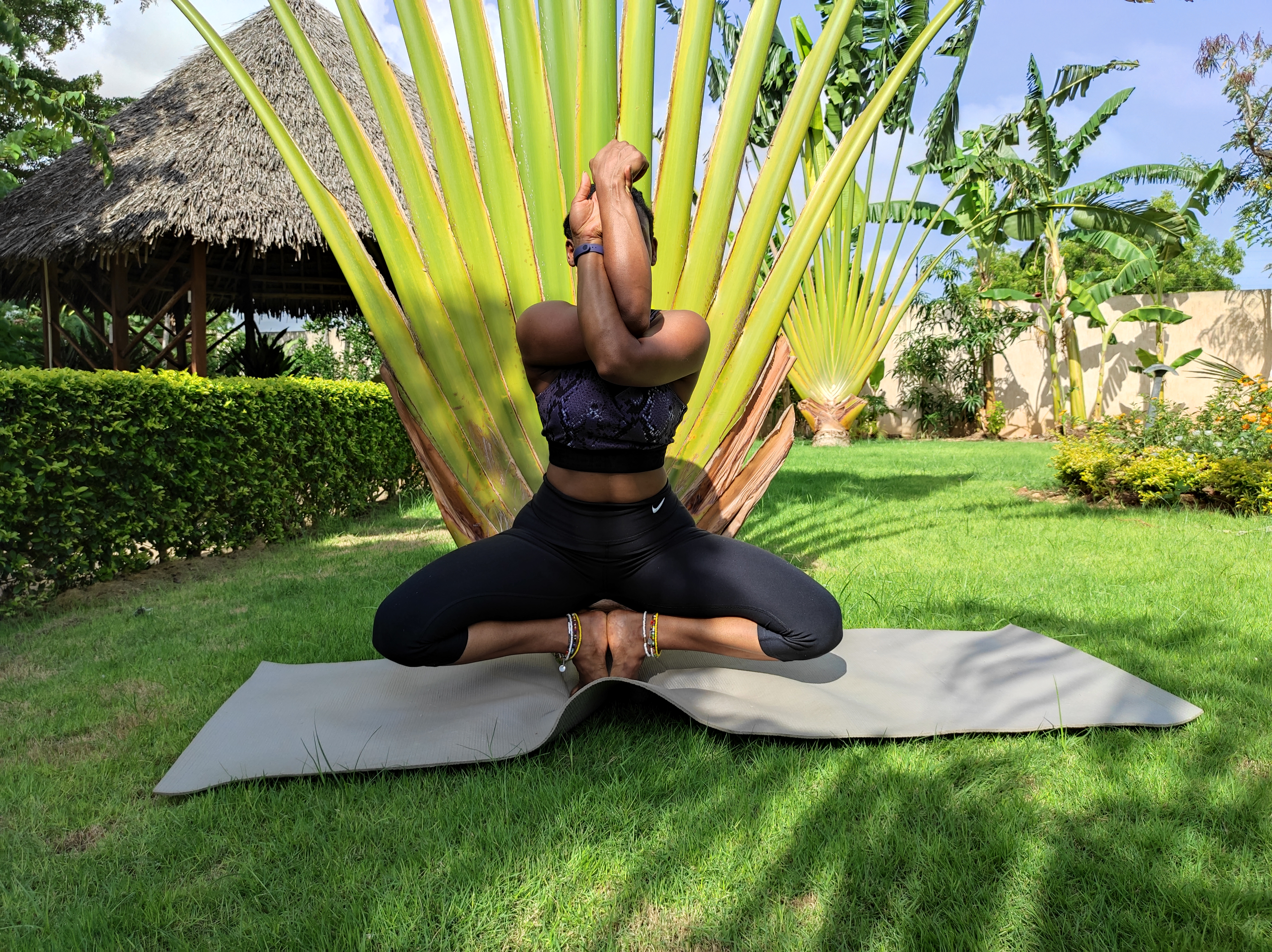
Yoga Practice in Tanzania

The five pillars of India's soft power—dignity, dialogue, shared prosperity, regional and global security, and cultural and civilizational links—are strategically employed to enhance its global influence. On May 21, 2021, the Indian Council for Cultural Relations (ICCR) announced plans to use Indian cuisine as a form of soft power, emphasizing its role in showcasing India's cultural heritage. Additionally, the soft power of India in Africa has been reflected in cultural exchanges, including the influence of Bollywood movies, the spread of yoga practices, and the involvement of the Indian diaspora.

=== Italy ===
The elements of Italian soft culture are its art, music, fashion, design, and food. Italy was the birthplace of opera, and for generations the language of opera was Italian. Popular tastes in drama in Italy have long favored comedy; the improvisational style known as the Commedia dell'arte began in Italy in the mid-16th century and is still performed today. Before being exported to France and Russia, ballet also originated in Italy. The country boasts several world-famous cities: Rome was the ancient capital of the Roman Empire and the seat of the Pope of the Catholic Church. Rome is generally considered one of the "cradles of Western civilization and Christian culture". Florence was the heart of the Renaissance, a period of great achievements in the arts which marked the transition from the Middle Ages to modernity. Other important cities include Turin, one of the world's great centers of automobile engineering. Milan is one of the "Big Four" fashion capitals. Venice, with its intricate canal system and history of seafaring, attracts tourists around the world, especially during the Venetian Carnival and the Venice Biennale. Italy is home to the greatest number of UNESCO World Heritage Sites (59) to date. In 2019, Italy had the ninth largest diplomatic network in the world. Italy is the fifth most visited country in the world.

=== Japan ===
"Cool Japan" is a concept coined in 2002 as an expression of Japan's popular culture. The concept has been adopted by the Japanese government as well as trade bodies seeking to exploit the commercial capital of the country's culture industry. It has been described as a form of soft power, "the ability to indirectly influence behavior or interests through cultural or ideological means." In a 2002 article in the journal Foreign Policy titled "Japan's Gross National Cool", Douglas McGray wrote of Japan "reinventing superpower" as its cultural influence expanded internationally despite the economic and political problems of the "lost decade." Surveying youth culture and the role of J-pop, manga, anime, video games, fashion, film, automobiles, consumer electronics, architecture, and cuisine, McGray highlighted Japan's considerable soft power, posing the question of what message the country might project. He also argued that Japan's recession may even have boosted its national cool, due to the partial discrediting of erstwhile rigid social hierarchies and big-business career paths. In 2015, during remarks welcoming Japanese prime minister Shinzo Abe to the White House, President Barack Obama thanked Japan for its cultural contributions to the United States by saying:

This visit is a celebration of the ties of friendship and family that bind our peoples. I first felt it when I was 6 years old when my mother took me to Japan. I felt it growing up in Hawaii, like communities across our country, home to so many proud Japanese Americans... Today is also a chance for Americans, especially our young people, to say thank you for all the things we love from Japan. Like karate and karaoke. Manga and anime. And, of course, emojis.

In 2017, Japan had the fifth largest diplomatic network in the world. Anime, manga and Japanese films are considered to be soft power. In April 2023, the Japan Business Federation laid out a proposal aiming to spur the economic growth of Japan by further promoting the contents industry abroad, primarily anime, manga and video games, for measures to invite industry experts from abroad to come to Japan to work, and to link with the tourism sector to help foreign fans of manga and anime visit sites across the country associated with particular manga stories. The federation seeks on quadrupling the sales of Japanese content in overseas markets within the upcoming 10 years. In 2023, U.S. News & World Report ranked Japan's cultural influence as the highest in Asia and 5th worldwide. Today, the culture of Japan stands as one of the most popular cultures around the world, mainly because of the global reach of its popular culture. Currently, the worldwide spread of Japanese popular culture can most often be seen in the Western world, Latin America, Arab World, East, South and Southeast Asia.

=== Russia ===
Russia has been developing its soft power by investing in various public diplomacy instruments throughout the 2000s but the term was first used in an official document in 2010 as President Medvedev approved an Addendum to the national Foreign Policy Concept. The term was not defined but it was described as related to cultural diplomacy. In 2013, the term appeared in a new version of the Foreign Policy Concept where the soft power was defined as "a comprehensive toolkit for achieving foreign policy objectives building on civil society potential, information, cultural and other methods and technologies alternative to traditional diplomacy." In 2007, Russian president Vladimir Putin was named Time Person of the Year. In 2013, he was named most powerful person by Forbes magazine. In 2015, Russia led the creation of the Eurasian Economic Union. In 2017, Russia had the fourth largest diplomatic network in the world. In the wake of the poisoning of Sergei and Yulia Skripal in 2018, the BBC reported that "Its extensive diplomatic network reflects both its imperial history as a great power in the 19th Century, as well as its Cold War posture. It has a multitude of posts in Eastern Europe and former communist allies including China, Vietnam, Cuba and Angola, as well as legacies of the former USSR in Africa and Asia. The size of its network reflects the extent of its undiminished global ambition."

=== South Korea ===
U.S. President Barack Obama: "...And of course, around the world, people are being swept up by Korean culture -- the Korean Wave"

As is clear with the recent rise of Psy's "Gangnam Style",
the Hallyu-wave and Korean pop music, Korean culture
is making its mark on the world.
—United Nations Secretary General Ban Ki-moon

"Hallyu", also known as the "Korean Wave", is a neologism referring to the spread of South Korean culture since the late 1990s. According to a Washington Post reporter, the spread of South Korean entertainment has led to higher sales of other goods and services such as food, clothing, and Korean language classes. Besides increasing the amount of exports, the Korean Wave is used by the government as a soft power tool to engage with the masses of young people all over the world.

In the 21st century, culture is power.

— Former South Korean president Park Geun-hye.

In 2012, the BBC's country rating poll revealed that public opinion of South Korea has been improving every year since the first rating poll for the country was conducted in 2009. In several countries such as Taiwan, India, France and Japan, public opinion about South Korea is generally positive. The report cited culture and tradition as among the most important factors contributing to positive perceptions of South Korea. This comes alongside a rapid growth in the total value of cultural exports which rose to US$4.2 billion in 2011. And as of 2021, South Korea's cultural content industry has exports of $12.45 billion.

First driven by the spread of Korean dramas televised across East, South and Southeast Asia during its initial stages, the Korean Wave evolved from a regional development into a global phenomenon due to the proliferation of Korean pop (K-pop) music videos on YouTube.[133][134] Developed far beyond YouTube, the most successful K-pop band, BTS, is valued to be worth US$5 billion, generating impressive revenue for South Korea.[135] Currently, the spread of the Korean Wave to other regions of the world is most visibly seen among teenagers and young adults in East Asia, the Middle East, Latin America, and immigrant enclaves of the Western world.[136][137][138]

=== United Kingdom ===
Since the 1814–1914 century of Pax Britannica the foreign relations of the United Kingdom has held a significant soft power component.

British influence can be observed in the legal and political systems of many of its former colonies, and the UK's culture remains globally influential, particularly in language, literature, music and sport. English is the most widely spoken Germanic language as well as the world's most widely spoken language and the third-most spoken native language. It is a co-official language of the United Nations, the European Union, and many other international and regional organisations. It has also become the de facto language of diplomacy, science, international trade, tourism, aviation, entertainment and the internet.

=== United States ===
The foreign relations of the United States has long had a great deal of soft power. Examples of the impact include Franklin D. Roosevelt's Four Freedoms in Europe to motivate the Allies in World War II; Nelson Rockefeller's use of cultural diplomacy on CBS's La Cadena de las Americas network while supervising the Office of the Coordinator of Inter-American Affairs in support of Roosevelt's Pan-Americanism during World War II;" people behind the Iron Curtain listening to the government's foreign propaganda arm Radio Free Europe; newly liberated Afghans in 2001 asking for a copy of the Bill of Rights and young Afghans today surreptitiously watching banned American videos and satellite television broadcasts in the privacy of their homes. America's early commitment to religious toleration, for example, was a powerful element of its overall appeal to potential immigrants; and American aid in the reconstruction of Europe after World War II was a propaganda victory to show off the prosperity and the generosity of the people of the United States.

American culture has been embraced around the world for many decades. Due to America's superpower status, American culture is often seen as "hegemonic". American dominance and the popularization of American media largely contributed to the English language (particularly American English) becoming the global lingua franca. American music has had a wide influence over the development of music around the globe. American architecture and urban planning, American political and economic philosophy, and American film and television have played strong roles in shaping both western and non-western culture. American cuisine, fashion trends, literature, theatre, and dance have also widely influenced global culture of the modern era, and various subcultures that were born in the United States, such as the hippie, hip-hop, punk rock, rock and roll, greaser, grunge, and Beatnik movements (among others), have influenced mainstream culture of the 20th and 21st centuries. American technology and social media companies hold a monopoly over the world's digital space.

Studies of American broadcasting into the Soviet bloc, and testimonials from Czech president Václav Havel, Polish president Lech Wałęsa, and Russian president Boris Yeltsin, support that soft power efforts of the United States and its allies during the Cold War were ultimately successful in creating the favorable conditions that led to the collapse of the Soviet Union.

Satellite TV is actively promoting American soft power in the Arab world in ways that the United States has been incapable of doing. The launch of the Arabic-language Alhurra satellite channel in early 2004 to provide news and entertainment in ways more beneficial to the U.S., marked an important turning point in U.S. public diplomacy development. Though it calls itself the largest Arabic-language news organization in the world, the Virginia-based Alhurra lacks the cachet and brand recognition of Al Jazeera, but its balanced presentation of news has earned it a small but significant viewership. Controversial innovations in radio broadcasting that target young mass audiences through a mix of light news and mild American popular music – Radio Sawa in Arabic and Radio Farda in Persian – have captured a substantial market share in their target regions.

== See also ==
- Cultural diplomacy – Exchange of culture between nations
- Cultural hegemony – Marxist theory of cultural dominance
- Democratic peace theory – International relations theory
- Hasbara – Public relations work by the State of Israel
- Intangible asset – Concept in accounting and economics
- Middle power – Type of state
- Power (international relations) – Concept in international relations
- Power (social and political) – Ability to influence the behaviour of others
- Power projection – Capacity of a state to deploy and sustain military forces outside its territory
- Science diplomacy – International scientific cooperation
- Sharp power – Type of power in international relations
- Smart power – Combination of hard power and soft power strategies in international relations
- Social influence – Alteration of attitudes and behaviors based on outside influences
- Soft power of India in Africa
