= Political science =

Scientific study of politics and social science

Political science (sometimes abbreviated as poli sci) is a field which aims to study the scientific aspect of politics. It deals with systems of governance and power, and the analysis of political activities, political thought, political behavior, and associated constitutions and laws. Specialists in the field are political scientists. Unlike political philosophy, which is primarily normative and evaluates politics through value judgments, political science emphasizes descriptive and explanatory means of articulating what is and favors empirical evidence over ethical judgements. Political science emerged as a distinct academic discipline in the late 19th century, influenced by the rise of empiricism and positivism. It emerged from history, philosophy, and law amid university professionalization and the founding of bodies such as the American Political Science Association in 1903. The behavioral revolution of the 1950s played a significant role in shifting emphasis to scientifically explaining human behavior from an unbiased and neutral point of view using quantitative research methods such as surveys, historical analysis, and empirical testing.

== History ==
=== Origin ===
As a social science, contemporary political science started to take shape in the latter half of the 19th century and began to separate itself from political philosophy and history. Into the late 19th century, it was still uncommon for political science to be considered a distinct field from history. The term "political science" was not always distinguished from political philosophy, and the modern discipline has a clear set of antecedents including moral philosophy, political economy, political theology, history, and other fields concerned with normative determinations of what ought to be and with deducing the characteristics and functions of the ideal state.

Generally, while classical political philosophy is primarily defined by a concern for Hellenic and Enlightenment thought, political scientists are also marked by a great concern for "modernity" and the contemporary nation state, along with the study of classical thought, and as such share more terminology with sociologists (e.g., structure and agency).

The advent of political science as a university discipline was marked by the creation of university departments and chairs with the title of political science arising in the late 19th century. The designation "political scientist" is commonly used to denote someone with a doctorate or master's degree in the field. Integrating political studies of the past into a unified discipline is ongoing, and the history of political science has provided a rich field for the growth of both normative and positive political science, with each part of the discipline sharing some historical predecessors. The American Political Science Association and the American Political Science Review were founded in 1903 and 1906, respectively, to distinguish the study of politics from economics and other social phenomena. APSA membership rose from 204 in 1904 to 1,462 in 1915. APSA members played a key role in setting up political science departments that were distinct from history, philosophy, law, sociology, and economics.

A world map distinguishing countries of the world as federations (green) from unitary states (blue), a work of political science

The journal Political Science Quarterly was established in 1886 by the Academy of Political Science. In the inaugural issue of Political Science Quarterly, Munroe Smith defined political science as "the science of the state. Taken in this sense, it includes the organization and functions of the state, and the relation of states one to another."

As part of a United Nations Educational, Scientific, and Cultural Organization (UNESCO) initiative to promote political science in the late 1940s, the International Political Science Association was founded in 1949, along with national associations in France in 1949, Britain in 1950, and West Germany in 1951.

Founded in 1903, the American Political Science Association (APSA) is the leading professional organization for the study of political science and serves more than 11,000 members in more than 100 countries.

=== Behavioral revolution and new institutionalism ===
The late 1960s and early 1970s witnessed a takeoff in the use of deductive, game-theoretic formal modelling techniques aimed at generating a more analytical corpus of knowledge in the discipline. This period saw a surge of research that borrowed theory and methods from economics to study political institutions, such as the United States Congress, as well as political behavior, such as voting. William H. Riker and his colleagues and students at the University of Rochester were the main proponents of this shift.

Despite considerable research progress in the discipline based on all types of scholarship discussed above, scholars have noted that progress toward systematic theory has been modest and uneven.

=== 21st century ===
In 2000, the Perestroika Movement in political science was introduced as a reaction against what its supporters called the "mathematicization" of political science. Those who identified with the movement argued for a plurality of methodologies and approaches in political science and for more relevance of the discipline to those outside of it.

Some evolutionary psychology theories argue that humans have evolved a highly developed set of psychological mechanisms for dealing with politics. However, these mechanisms evolved to deal with the small-group politics that characterized the ancestral environment, not the much larger political structures of today's world. This is argued to explain many important features and systematic cognitive biases in current politics.

== Overview ==
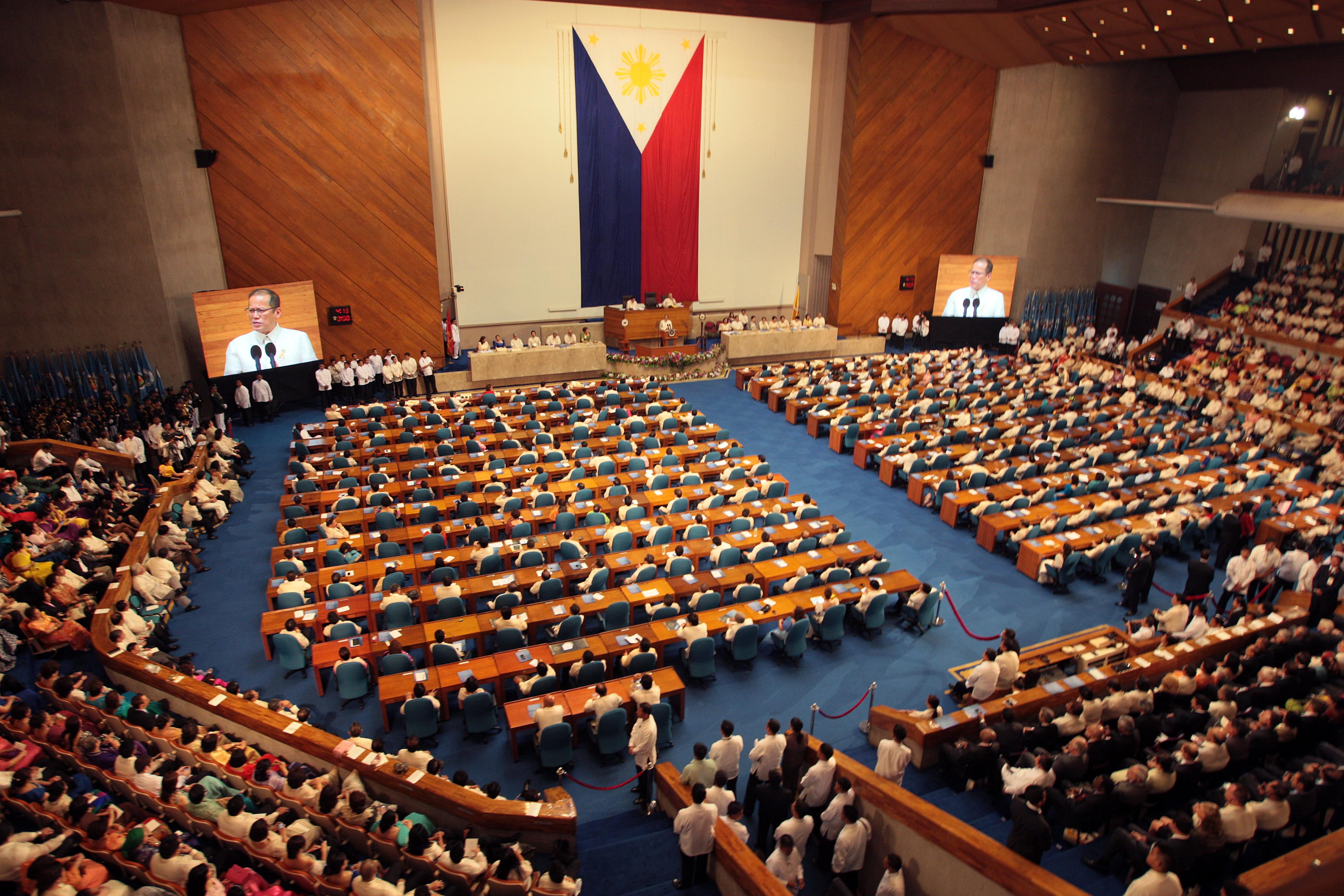
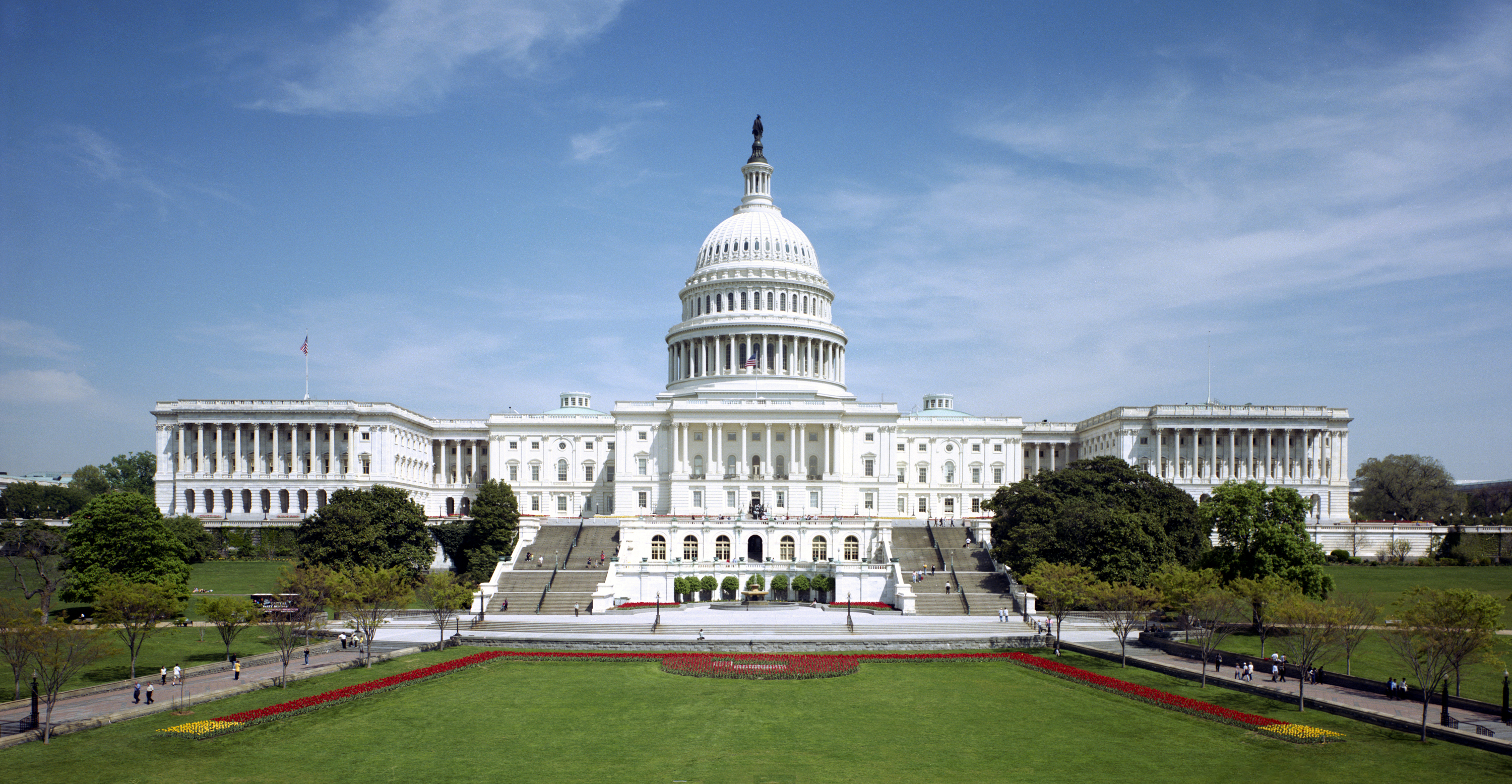
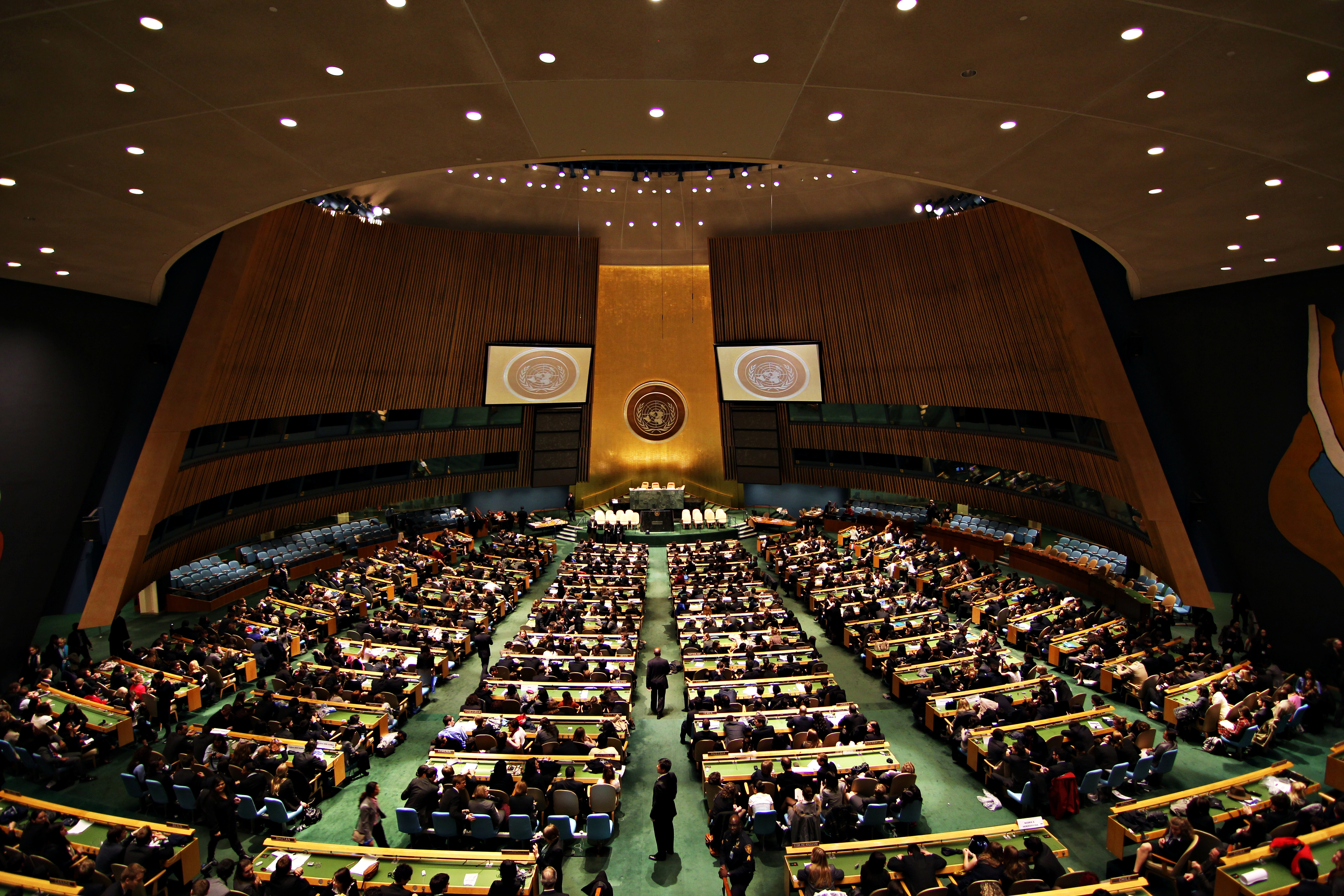
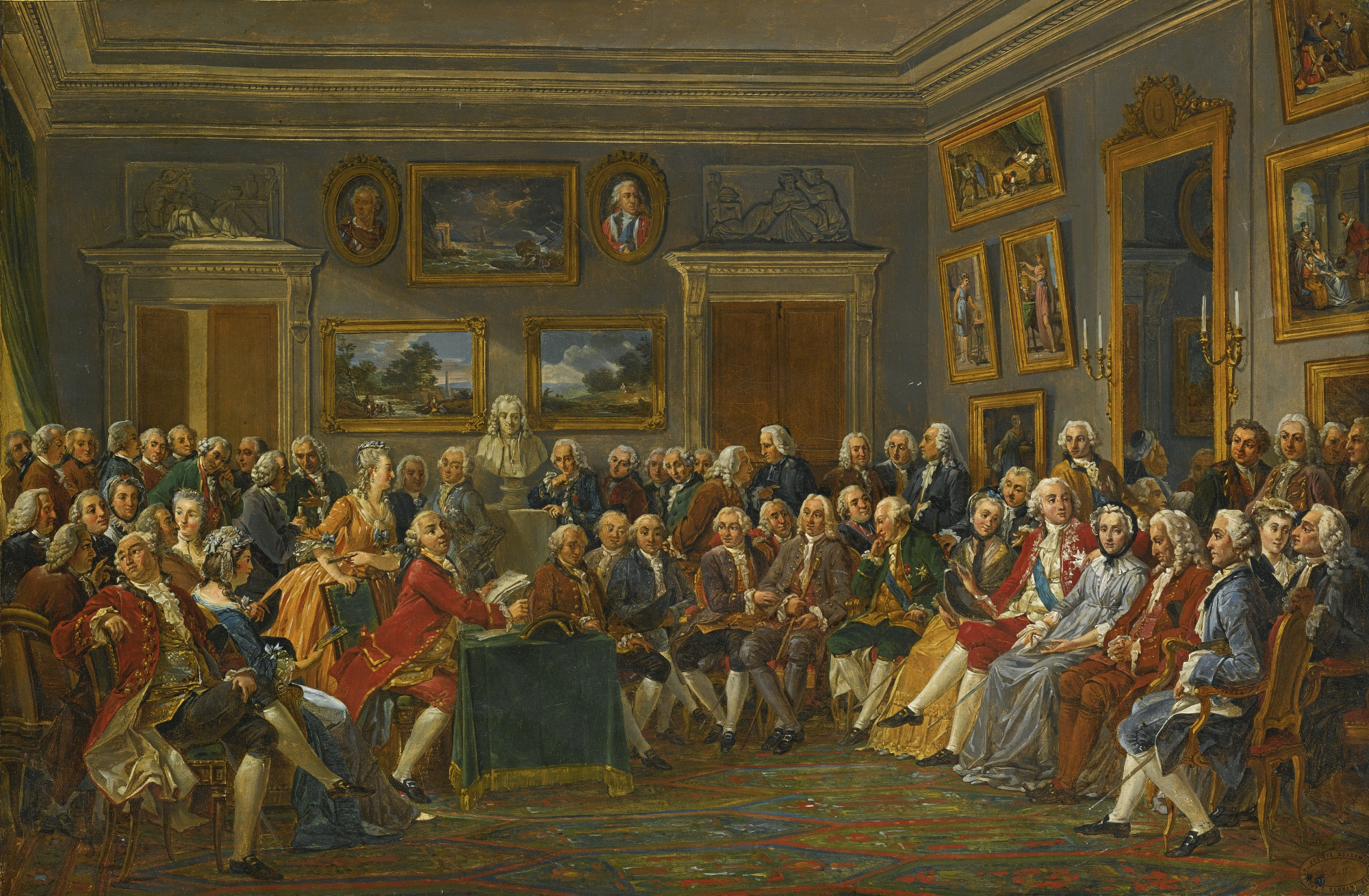
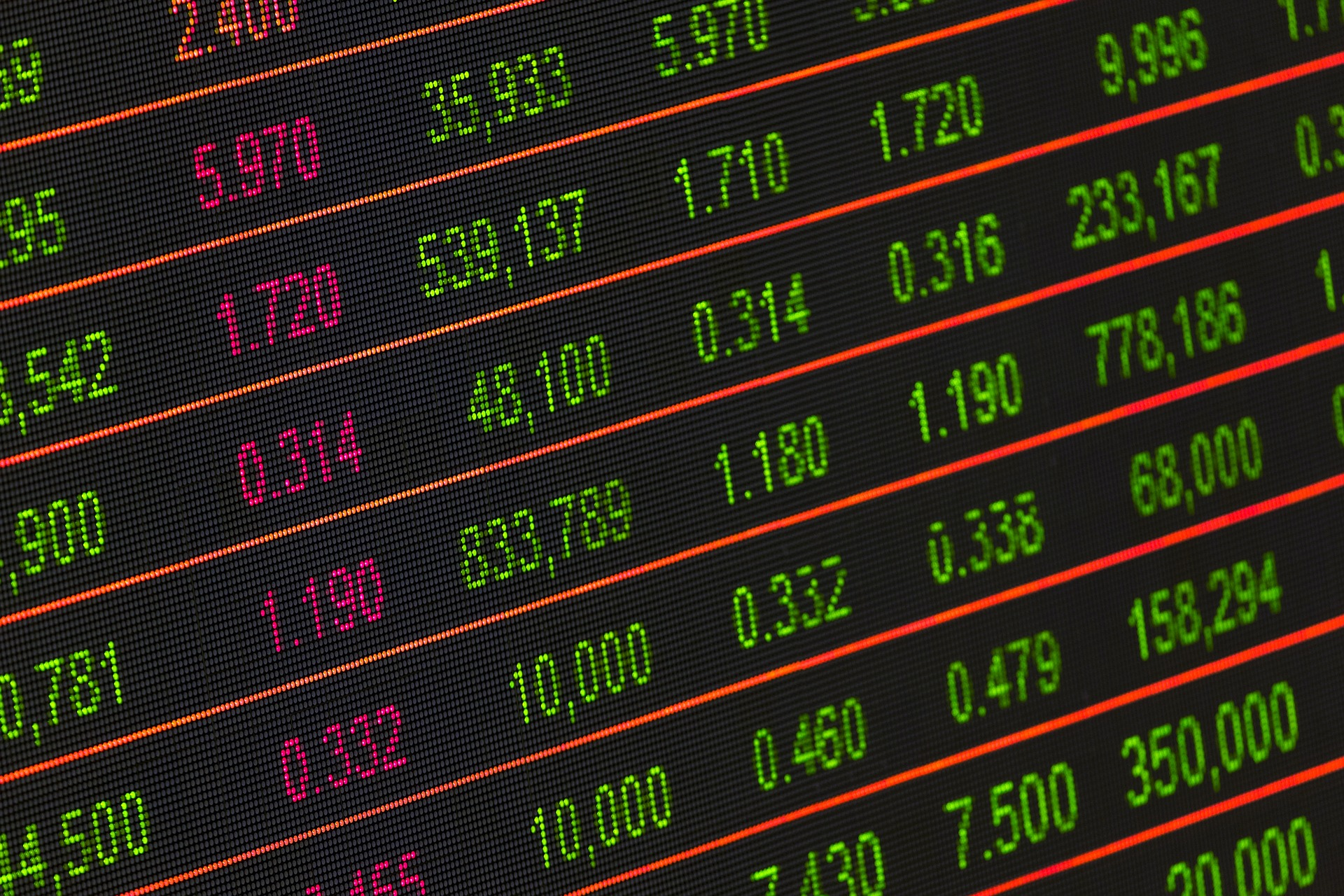
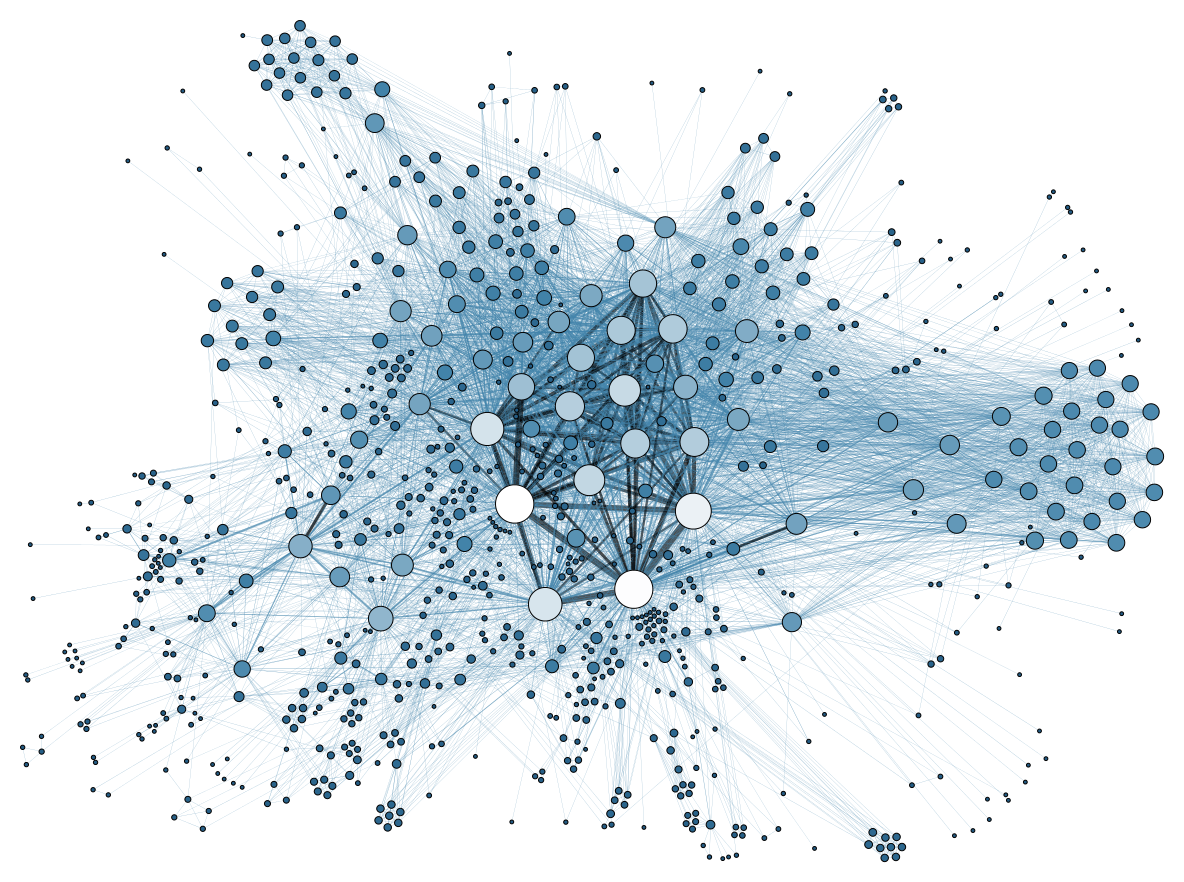
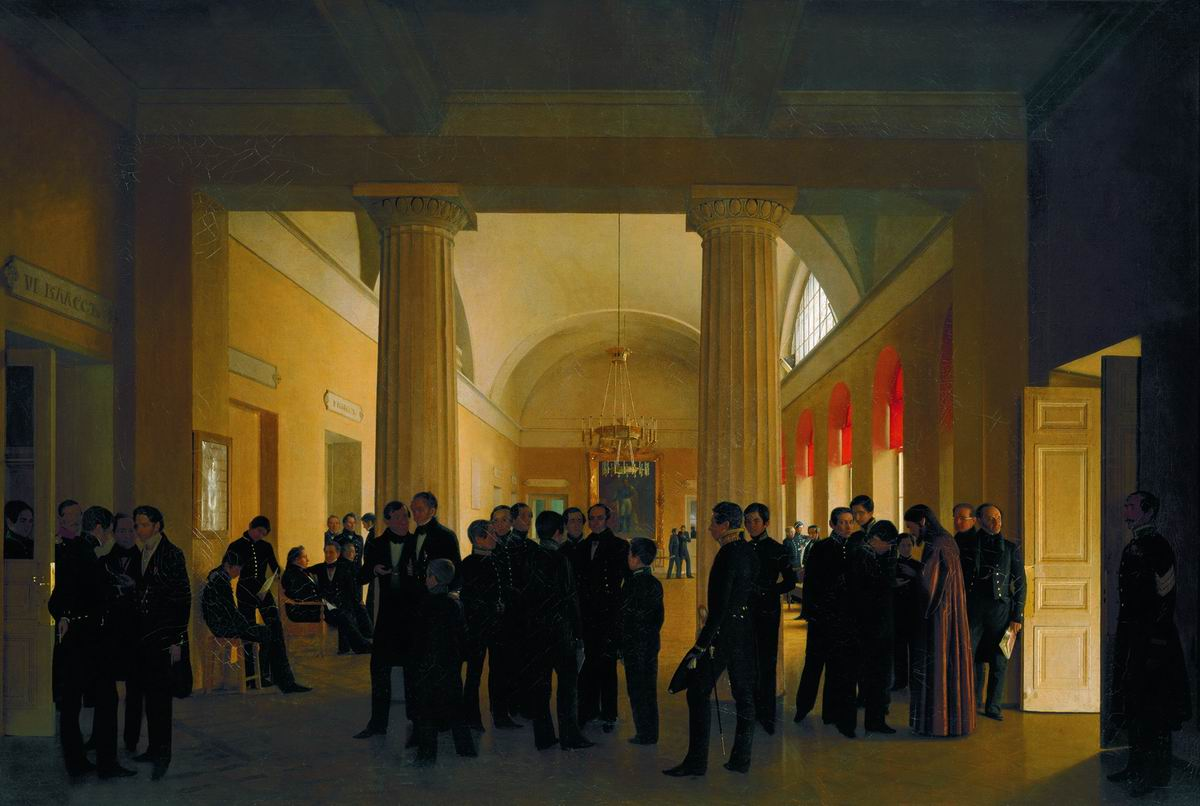
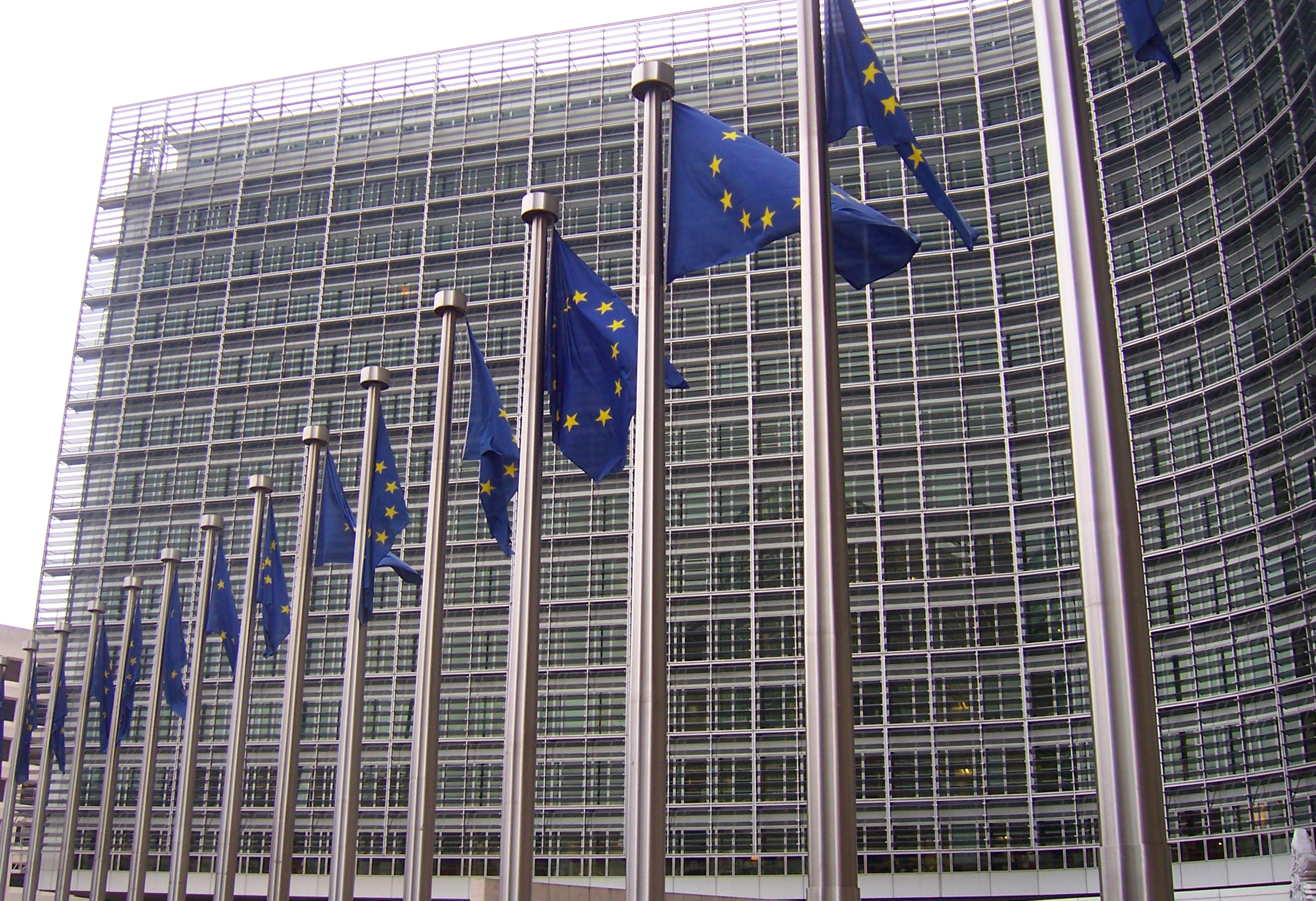
Main sub-disciplines of political science, from top left to right: 1. Domestic politics and government; 2. Comparative politics; 3. International relations; 4. Political theory; 5. Political economy; 6. Political methodology; 7. Public administration; 8. Public policy

Political science is a social study concerning the allocation and transfer of power in decision making, the roles and systems of governance including governments and international organizations, political behaviour, and public policies. It measures the success of governance and specific policies by examining many factors, including stability, justice, material wealth, peace, and public health. Some political scientists seek to advance positive theses (which attempt to describe how things are, as opposed to how they should be) by analysing politics; others advance normative theses, such as by making specific policy recommendations. The study of politics and policies can be closely connected—for example, through comparative analyses of which political institutions tend to produce certain policies. Political science provides analysis and predictions about political and governmental issues. Political scientists examine the processes, systems, and political dynamics of countries and regions of the world, often to raise public awareness or to influence specific governments.

Political scientists may provide the frameworks from which journalists, special interest groups, politicians, and the electorate analyze issues.

=== Country-specific studies ===
Political scientists may study political phenomena within one specific country. For example, they may study the politics of the United States or the politics of China.

Political scientists look at a variety of data, including constitutions, elections, public opinion, and public policy, foreign policy, legislatures, and judiciaries. Political scientists will often focus on the politics of their own country; for example, a political scientist from Indonesia may become an expert in the politics of Indonesia.

=== Anticipating crises ===
The theory of political transitions, and the methods of analyzing and anticipating crises, form an important part of political science. Several general indicators of crises and methods for anticipating critical transitions were proposed. Among them, one statistical indicator of crisis, a simultaneous increase of variance and correlations in large groups, was proposed for crisis anticipation and may be successfully used in various areas. Its applicability for early diagnosis of political crises was demonstrated by the analysis of the prolonged stress period preceding the 2014 Ukrainian economic and political crisis. There was a simultaneous increase in the total correlation between the 19 major public fears in the Ukrainian society (by about 64%) and in their statistical dispersion (by 29%) during the pre-crisis years. A feature shared by certain major revolutions is that they were not predicted. The theory of the apparent inevitability of crises and revolutions was also developed.

The study of major crises, both political and external, is not limited to attempts to predict regime transitions or major changes in political institutions. Political scientists also study how governments handle unexpected disasters, and how voters in democracies react to their governments' preparations for and responses to crises.

== Research methods ==
=== Research methods ===
Political science is methodologically diverse and appropriates many methods originating in psychology, social research, political philosophy, and many others, in addition to those that developed chiefly within the field of political science.

Political scientists approach the study of politics from a host of different ontological orientations and with a variety of different tools. Because political science is essentially a study of human behavior, in all aspects of politics, observations in controlled environments are often challenging to reproduce or duplicate, though experimental methods are increasingly common (see experimental political science). Citing this difficulty, former American Political Science Association President Lawrence Lowell once said "We are limited by the impossibility of experiment. Politics is an observational, not an experimental science." Because of this, political scientists have historically observed political elites, institutions, and individual or group behaviour to identify patterns, draw generalizations, and build theories of politics.

Like all social sciences, political science faces the difficulty of observing human actors that can only be partially observed and who have the capacity for making conscious choices, unlike other subjects, such as non-human organisms in biology, minerals in geoscience, chemical elements in chemistry, stars in astronomy, or particles in physics. Despite its complexities, contemporary political science has advanced by adopting a variety of methods and theoretical approaches to understanding politics, and methodological pluralism is a defining feature of the field.

Empirical political science methods include the use of field experiments, surveys and survey experiments, case studies, process tracing, historical and institutional analysis, ethnography, participant observation, and interview research.

Political scientists also use and develop theoretical tools such as game theory and agent-based models to study a wide range of political systems and situations. Other approaches include the study of equation-based models and opinion dynamics.

Political theorists approach theories of political phenomena with a wide range of positions and tools, including feminist political theory, historical analysis associated with the Cambridge School, and Straussian approaches.

Political science may overlap with topics of study that are the traditional focuses of other social sciences—for example, when sociological norms or psychological biases are connected to political phenomena. In these cases, political science may either inherit its methods of study or develop a contrasting approach. For example, Lisa Wedeen has argued that political science's approach to the idea of culture, originating with Gabriel Almond and Sidney Verba and exemplified by authors like Samuel P. Huntington, could benefit from aligning more closely with the study of culture in anthropology. In turn, methodologies that are developed within political science may influence how researchers in other fields, like public health, conceive of and approach political processes and policies.

The most common piece of academic writing in generalist political sciences is the research paper, which investigates an original research question.

== Education ==
Political science, possibly like the social sciences as a whole, can be described "as a discipline which lives on the fault line between the 'two cultures' in the academy, the sciences and the humanities." Thus, in most American colleges, especially liberal arts colleges, it would be located within the school or college of arts and sciences. If no separate college of arts and sciences exists, or if the college or university prefers that it be in a separate constituent college or academic department, then political science may be a separate department housed as part of a division or school of humanities or liberal arts. At some universities, especially research universities and in particular those that have a strong cooperation between research, undergraduate, and graduate faculty with a stronger, more applied emphasis in public administration, political science would be taught by the university's public policy school.

Most United States colleges and universities offer BA programs in political science. MA or MAT and PhD or EdD programs are common at larger universities. The term political science is more popular in post-1960s North America than elsewhere while universities predating the 1960s or those historically influenced by them would call the field of study government; other institutions, especially those outside the United States, see political science as part of a broader discipline of political studies or politics in general. While political science implies the use of the scientific method, political studies implies a broader approach, although the naming of degree courses does not necessarily reflect their content. Separate, specialized, or, in some cases, professional degree programs in international relations, public policy, and public administration are common at both the undergraduate and postgraduate levels. However, most, but not all, undergraduate-level education in these sub-fields of political science is found in academic concentrations within a political science academic major. Master's-level programs in public administration are professional degrees covering public policy and other applied subjects; they are often seen as more closely linked to politics than to other disciplines, which may be reflected in their being housed in that department.

== See also ==
- History of political science
- International relations – Study of relationships between states
- Political history of the world
- Political legitimacy – Right and acceptance of an authority
- Political philosophy – Study of the foundations of politics

=== Lists ===
- Index of politics articles
- Political lists
- Outline of political science
