= Perestroika Movement (political science) =

The Perestroika Movement is a loose-knit intellectual tendency in academic political science which seeks to expand methodological pluralism in order to make the discipline more accessible and relevant to laypeople and non-specialist academics. Established in 2000, the movement was organized in response to the perceived hegemony of quantitative and mathematical methodology in the field. Such dominance breeds academic isolation and poor scholarship, the movement's leaders contend.

== Origins ==
The Perestroika Movement began in 2000 with an anonymous e-mail message sent by one “Mr. Perestroika” to the editors of the American Political Science Review calling for "a dismantling of the Orwellian system that we have in APSA." The message went to seventeen recipients who quickly forwarded it to others, and within weeks the Perestroika Movement became a force calling for change in the American political science community (Monroe 2005).

== See also ==
- Perestroika
- Post-autistic economics

== Sources and further reading ==
- Dryzek, John S. "Revolutions without Enemies: Key Transformations in Political Science," American Political Science Review 100 (2006), 487-92.
- Flyvbjerg, Bent, "A Perestroikan Straw Man Answers Back: David Laitin and Phronetic Political Science," Politics & Society 32 (2004), 389-416.
- Laitin, David D., "The Perestroikan Challenge to Social Science" (Politics & Society 31 (2003), 163).
- Monroe, Kristen Renwick, ed., Perestroika!: The Raucous Rebellion in Political Science (New Haven: Yale University Press, 2005).
- Rigger, Shelley. "The Perestroika Movement in American Political Science and Its Lessons for Chinese Political Studies," Journal of Chinese Political Science 14 (2009), 369-82.
- Schram, Sanford F., and Brian Caterino, eds., Making Political Science Matter: Debating Knowledge, Research, and Method (New York: New York University Press, 2006).
