= Hard power =

Use of military and economic means to influence other political bodies

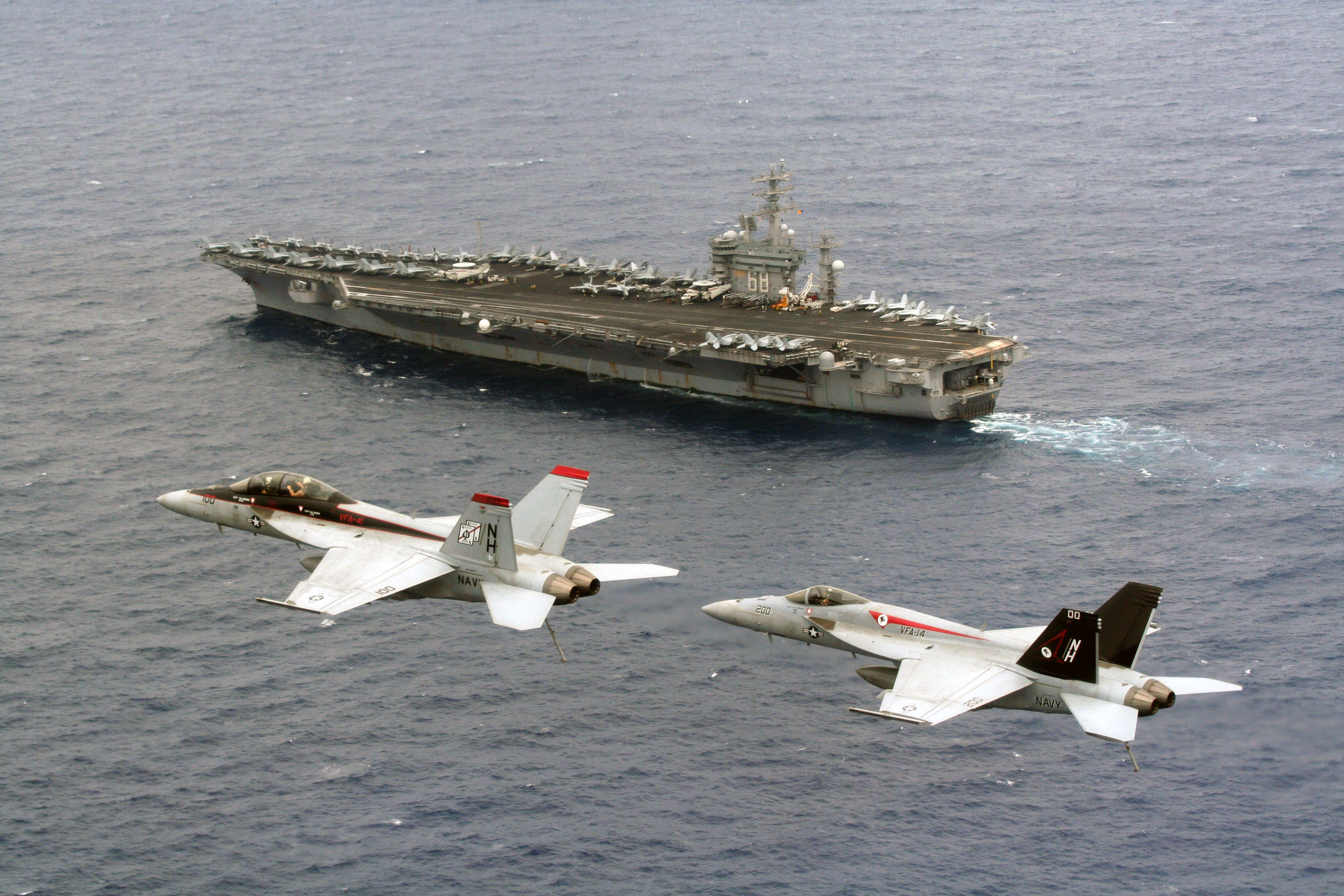
USS Nimitz at sea

Hard power in politics is the use of military and economic means to influence the behavior or interests of other political bodies. This form of political power is often aggressive (coercion), and is most immediately effective when imposed by one political body upon another of less military and/or economic power. Hard power contrasts with soft power, which comes from diplomacy, culture and history.

According to Joseph Nye, hard power involves "the ability to use the carrots and sticks of economic and military might to make others follow your will". Here, "carrots" stand for inducements such as the reduction of trade barriers, the offer of an alliance or the promise of military protection. On the other hand, "sticks" represent threats - including the use of coercive diplomacy, the threat of military intervention, or the implementation of economic sanctions. Ernest Wilson describes hard power as the capacity to coerce "another to act in ways in which that entity would not have acted otherwise".

== History ==
While the existence of hard power has a long history, the term itself arose when Joseph Nye coined soft power as a new and different form of power in a sovereign state's foreign policy. According to the realist school in international relations theory, power is linked with the possession of certain tangible resources, including population, territory, natural resources, economic and military strength, among others. Hard power describes a nation or political body's ability to use economic incentives or military strength to influence other actors' behaviors.

Hard power encompasses a wide range of coercive policies, such as coercive diplomacy, economic sanctions, military action, and the forming of military alliances for deterrence and mutual defense. Hard power can be used to establish or change a state of political hegemony or balance of power. Although the term hard power generally refers to diplomacy, it can also be used to describe forms of negotiation which involve pressure or threats as leverage.

== Examples ==
The United States has demonstrated a 'hard power' policy in regard to the Iraq War, the Afghanistan War and its continued war on the Taliban. To be more specific, the United States' attack on Iraq in 2003 was initially justified based on concerns about Iraq's possession of weapons of mass destruction (WMD). In part by referring to "war on terrorism," George W. Bush administration used hard power measures to uproot Iraqi dictator Saddam Hussein and to handle subsequent crisis in Iraq.

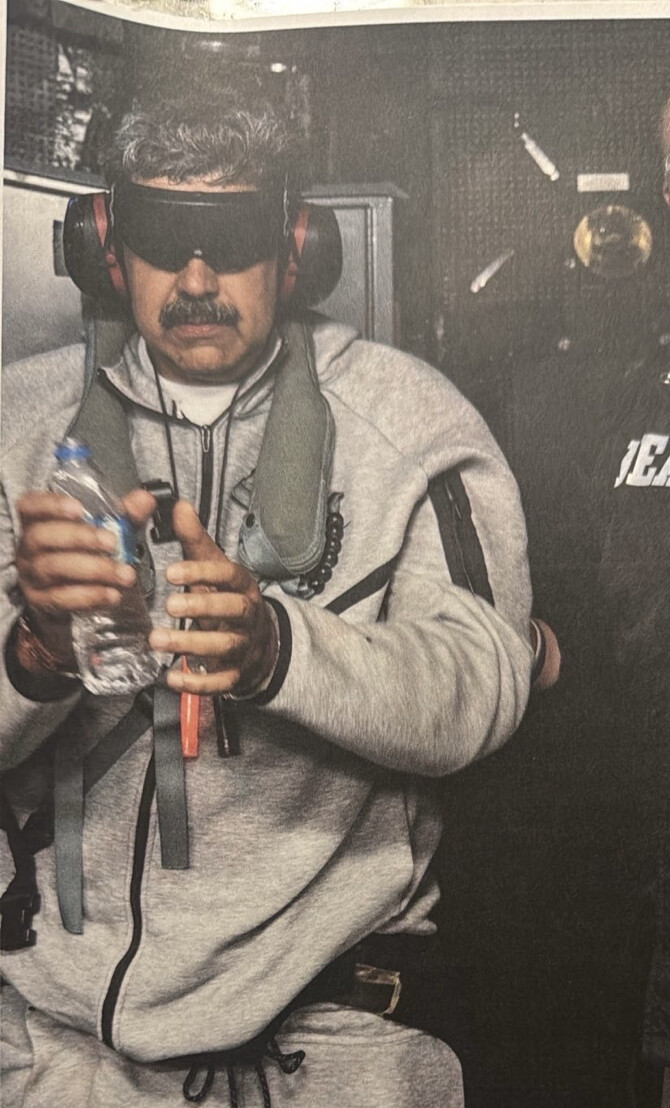
Nicolás Maduro after capture.

Joseph Nye has used the term to define some policy measures in regard to Iran as well. For instance, there are many sanctions against Iran passed by UN Security Council and numerous nations such as the United States and those of the European Union also impose bilateral sanctions against Iran. They impose restrictions on exports of nuclear and missile to Iran, banking and insurance transactions, investment in oil, exports of refined petroleum products, and so on. Many nations adopted these measures to deter Iran's possible nuclear weapons programs and to compel Iran to negotiate a P5+1 deal that would cut its nuclear weapons programme, which was steadily advancing toward making Iran a nuclear power. The economic sanctions imposed saw a major economic collapse of the Iranian economy in terms of inflation and GDP. This in may part was described as effective use of economic hard power compared to less effective attempts such as those on North Korea. Those actions conduced to Assassination of Ali Khamenei.

Another recent example is the Capture of Nicolas Maduro, where, in violation of Venezuelan sovereignty, the president and his wife were taken into custody. Their political regime was hostile to the United States and was aligned with rival or enemy nations like Iran, China and Russia.

== See also ==
- Soft power
- Sharp power
- Smart power
- Power (international relations)
- Power (social and political)
- Hostage diplomacy
