= Bill Noël =

- Born: May 11, 1914; Fort Worth, Texas, USA
- Died: January 9, 1987 (aged 72); Odessa, Ector County, Texas
- Education: University of Texas at Austin
- Occupations: Oilman; Banker; Rancher
- Spouse: Ellen Witwer Noël (married 1937–1987, his death)
- Children: 2

William Douglas Noël (May 11, 1914 – January 9, 1987), was an American independent oilman, industrialist, banker, rancher, philanthropist, and civic leader in Odessa, Texas.

== Background ==
Noël was born in Fort Worth, the son of Earnest Noël and the former Inez Turnpaugh. Orphaned at the age of six, he was reared by grandparents and an aunt and an uncle. In 1931, Noël graduated from high school in Fort Worth. In 1935, he earned a Bachelor of Business Administration degree from the University of Texas at Austin. Thereafter, he worked as a roustabout for Gulf Oil Company. In 1936, he moved to the Permian Basin of West Texas to work as a chemist in the Gulf Oil Wickett refinery. His extensive endeavors in all phases of oil production soon transformed the Odessa economy into a major petrochemical complex.

Noël also became involved in banking and ranching throughout Texas. With Earl G. Rodman Sr. (1896–1976), Noël in 1956 co-founded the American Bank of Commerce in Odessa. In time, he acquired major interest in banks in Big Spring, Fort Worth, Lubbock, San Angelo, and San Antonio. In 1973, when three Noël-Rodman banks merged, Noël became a director of Texas Commerce Bancshares of Houston.

In 1940, Noël moved to McCamey, now known as the "Wind Energy Capital of Texas," located in Upton County. There he joined M. H. McWhirter of Monahans and J. B. Tubb of Crane County to establish the Trebol Oil Company. Noël worked long hours for Trebol. Trebol drilled fifty-two consecutive producing wells before it struck a dry hole. Noël was so consumed with pursuits of the business that he claimed to have been unaware that he had become a millionaire until several years after the accumulation of his early fortune.

== Business ventures ==
In 1946, Noël and Earl Rodman also formed a partnership with the purchase of a refinery, which they named the Odessa Natural Gasoline Company.

In 1957, Noël and Rodman founded West Texas Gathering Company, which resold natural gas to residential customer of two other companies. The partners further drilled discovery wells in two fields in Upton County.

In 1975, Noël purchased Fort Terrett Ranch in Sutton County near Junction, Texas. On this ranch, Noël grew Texas pecans as a commercial food source in an orchard of 120 acres (490,000 m^{2}). He also owned orchards in Upton and Comanche counties.

In 1963, Noël was named "Outstanding Citizen" of Odessa. That same year he was elected to the Hall of Fame of the Permian Basin Petroleum Museum in Odessa's sister city of Midland. In 1985, UT named Noël a distinguished alumnus.

== Civic endeavors ==
Noël worked to establish the University of Texas of the Permian Basin, which opened in Odessa with barely a thousand students in 1973. In 1974, Noël and his wife, the former Ellen Witwer (March 21, 1914 – May 1, 2008), with an initial outlay of $245,525, endowed the Ellen and Bill Noël Scholarship Fund at UTPB. Noël wanted to assist the children of his employees attending UTPB and to boost enrollment on the then fledgling campus. In an interview, Noël acknowledged that his opportunity to attend college had been essential to his own success: 'I've always felt like that was something that needed to be repaid." The Noëls endowed the position of the Ellen and Bill Noël Distinguished Professor for Energy Research, recently held by Dr. Mike Robinson. The couple also underwrote scholarships at the community college, Odessa College, and contributed to the establishment of the Globe Theatre of the Great Southwest, patterned after William Shakespeare's Globe Theater and located on the Odessa College campus.

Bill and Ellen Noël had two daughters. Lissa N. Wagner of Midland and Sherwood Noel McGuigan of Durango, Colorado, and six grandchildren. The couple was Presbyterian. Noël died of cancer in Odessa at the age of seventy-two. His wife died in her Odessa home twenty years later.

== Ellen Witwer Noël ==
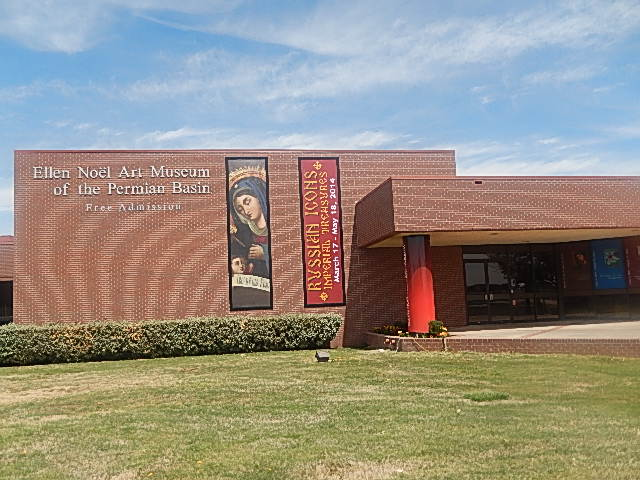
Ellen Noël Art Museum in Odessa

On May 24, 1937, Noël married Ellen Witwer, a native of Tulsa, Oklahoma, and a graduate of Duke University in Durham, North Carolina, where she was a member of Kappa Kappa Gamma. Early in her career, she taught school while the couple lived in McCamey, Texas. In time, she became a philanthropist in her own right. In 1993, Mrs. Noël contributed $1 million to establish the UTPB "Support for Excellence Fund," which is invested in the university's long-term account. A veteran supporter of the arts, she is the namesake of the Ellen Noël Art Museum of the Permian Basin, located adjacent to the Presidential Museum and Leadership Library. She co-sponsored the creation of the Noël Heritage Plaza in downtown Odessa. She was active in the Midland/Odessa Symphony & Chorale, the Permian Playhouse, the White-Pool House Museum, and the Parker Ranch House, Mrs. Noël also contributed funds for the Ellen and Bill Noël Therapy Center at High Sky Children's Ranch in Midland. She was one of the first woman directors of the Salvation Army in Odessa.

UTPB's Wagner Noël Performing Arts Center is an $81 million state-of-the-art music and theater complex, next to the UTPB Center for Energy and Economic Diversification, is located midway between Odessa and Midland. It opened on November 1, 2011, with a Gala Concert featuring Rod Stewart. Upon her death, Mrs. Noël donated to UTPB their estate, "Noël Oaks" at 2540 Palo Verde Drive in Odessa. Though the large Noël home had been intended for use as the president's residence, rising maintenance costs prompted the university to place the house on the market in June 2009 at an asking price of $2.1 million. When sold, proceeds were to be diverted to the Wagner Noël Performing Arts Center, according to UTPB president David Watts.

Upon Mrs. Noël's death, the Odessa American wrote in an editorial in her honor:

She was the epitome of grace and good taste. She was a tireless community leader and perhaps the most philanthropic citizen and arts patron to ever call Odessa home. ... Drive around Odessa and just take a look at all the things that benefited from the generosity of both Noëls. Theaters, museums, the Salvation Army, Harmony Home: The list could go on forever. And then think about how many wonderful deeds were done quietly and anonymously. Because that's really how Ellen Noël worked her magic. She was not a giver who insisted on having her name tied to her good deeds. In fact, she really didn't want the Ellen Noël Art Museum to be named after her and had to be talked into it. Gracious and generous. There is no way to account for all of the generous donations made by the Noëls behind the scenes. There are simply too many. Her wonderful example of generosity and volunteerism has set a high standard in Odessa for philanthropists and volunteers."
