= Howard Rosenthal =

Howard Rosenthal may refer to:

- Howard Rosenthal (psychotherapist), American psychotherapist and professor
- Howard Rosenthal (political scientist) (1939–2022), professor of politics at New York University
