= Nolan McCarty =

Nolan Matthew McCarty
- Born: December 10, 1967 (age 58); Odessa, Texas
- Occupations: Author, academic, professor

Academic background
- Education: University of Chicago (BA); Carnegie Mellon University (MS, PhD)

Academic work
- Discipline: Political Scientist
- Institutions: Princeton University (2001–present) Columbia University (1996–2001) USC Marshall School of Business (1993–1996)
- Main interests: U.S. politics, democratic political institutions, political game theory

Nolan Matthew McCarty (born December 10, 1967) is an American political scientist specializing in U.S. politics, democratic political institutions, and political methodology. He has made notable contributions to the study of partisan polarization, the politics of economic inequality, theories of policy-making, and the statistical analysis of legislative voting.

He is currently the Susan Dod Brown Professor of Politics and Public Affairs at Princeton University, where he is also the Director of the Center for Data-Driven Social Science.

== Early life and education ==
McCarty was born and raised in Odessa, Texas. He attended Nimitz Junior High School, earning an American Legion award. He graduated from Odessa High School in 1986 as valedictorian, where over his time there he received academic decathlon medals, an award from the Colorado School of Mines for math and science, and was a National Merit Finalist. While in high school, McCarty won first place in an essay contest sponsored by the Presidential Museum and Leadership Library, by focusing on economic policy if he was president.

He was a first-generation college student at the University of Chicago, where he would graduate with a BA in economics in 1990. He received a MS in political economy from Carnegie Mellon University in 1992, and a PhD in political economy from Carnegie Mellon University in 1993.

== Academia ==
Prior to joining the faculty at Princeton in 2001 as a professor, he taught at USC Marshall School of Business and Columbia University.

At Princeton, McCarty has served as chair of the Politics Department from 2011 to 2018; associate dean at Princeton School of Public and International Affairs from 2005 to 2011; acting dean, School of Public and International Affairs from 2007 to 2008; and as a member of the executive committees for the Julis-Rabinowitz Center for Finance and Public Policy and Center for the Study of Democratic Politics. In 2010, he and Princeton President emeritus Harold Shapiro co-chaired a significant curricular reform for the School of Public and International Affairs Undergraduate Program.

Along with Keith Krehbiel, he founded the Quarterly Journal of Political Science, a journal that focuses on innovative research in analytical political science. In 2010, McCarty was elected as a member of the American Academy of Arts and Sciences.

== Personal life ==
McCarty is married and has two kids.

He runs every day, competes in 20 races a year, and has finished 10 marathons.

== Books ==
- McCarty, Nolan; Lee, Frances, eds. (2019). Can America Govern Itself?. Cambridge: Cambridge University Press. ISBN 978-1-108-49729-9.
- ——————— (2016). Polarization: What Everyone Needs to Know. New York: Oxford University Press. ISBN 978-0-19-086777-5.
- ———————; Poole, Keith T.; Rosenthal, Howard (2013). Political Bubbles: Financial Crises and the Failure of American Democracy. Princeton: Princeton University Press. ISBN 978-0-691-14501-3.
- ———————; Meirowitz, Adam (2007). Political Game Theory: An Introduction. Cambridge: Cambridge University Press. ISBN 978-0-521-84107-8.
- ———————; Poole, Keith T.; Rosenthal, Howard (2006). Polarized America: The Dance of Ideology and Unequal Riches. Cambridge: MIT Press. ISBN 978-0-262-13464-4.
- ———————; Poole, Keith T.; Rosenthal, Howard (1997). Income Redistribution and the Realignment of American Politics. Washington, D.C.: AEI Press. ISBN 978-0-8447-7078-9.

== Selected publications ==
- The Ideological Mapping of American Legislatures (with Boris Shor) (American Political Science Review 105(3): 530–551, 2011)
- Political Fortunes: On Finance and Its Regulation (with Keith Poole, Thomas Romer and Howard Rosenthal) (Daedalus 139(4): 61–73, 2010)
- Does Gerrymandering Cause Polarization? (with Keith Poole and Howard Rosenthal) (American Journal of Political Science 53(3): 666–680, 2009)
- Presidential Vetoes in the Early Republic: Changing Constitutional Norms or Electoral Reform (Journal of Politics 71(2): 369–384, 2009)
- Bureaucratic Capacity, Delegation, and Political Reform (with John Huber) (American Political Science Review 98(3): 481–494, 2004)
- The Hunt for Party Discipline (with Keith Poole and Howard Rosenthal (American Political Science Review 95(3): 673–687, 2001)
- The Politics of Blame: Bargaining before an Audience (with Timothy Groseclose) (American Journal of Political Science 45(1): 100–119, 2000)
- Advice and Consent: Senate Response to Executive Branch Nominations, 1885–1996 (with Rose Razaghian (American Journal of Political Science 43(3): 1122–43, 1999)
