= Rocío Titiunik =

Argentine political scientist

Rocío Titiunik is an Argentine political scientist specializing in applied quantitative methodology for the social sciences. She is a professor of Politics in the Department of Politics at Princeton University, and between 2023 and 2026, was the Director of Princeton's Data-Driven Social Science Initiative.

== Education ==
Titiunik earned a Licentiate in Economics from the Universidad de Buenos Aires, and an M.S. and a Ph.D. in Agricultural and Resource Economics from the University of California, Berkeley.

== Career ==
After a postdoctoral fellowship in the Department of Political Science at the University of Michigan, Titiunik became an Assistant, Associate, and then full professor of political science there. In 2019, she took up the post of professor of politics at Princeton University.

In 2023, Titiunik was elected to be a Fellow of the American Association for the Advancement of Science (AAAS), in the Section on Social, Economic & Political Sciences. She is an Associate Editor at the journal Science Advances, in the Social Science, Economics, and Computing Science working group of the Social and Interdisciplinary Sciences and Public Health section. She is also on the advisory board of the journal Science.

== Research ==
Titiunik's research focuses on political economy and applied statistics, particularly the development and application of quantitative methods to the study of political institutions. She specializes in quasi-experimental methods for causal inference and political methodology.

== Awards ==
- Gosnell Prize for Excellence in Political Methodology, Society for Political Methodology, 2015, alongside Sebastian Calonico and Matias D. Cattaneo, for "Robust Nonparametric Confidence Intervals for Regression-Discontinuity Designs"
- Robert H. Durr Award, Midwest Political Science Association, 2008 (announced 2009), alongside Jasjeet S. Sekhon, for "Exploiting Tom DeLay: A New Method for Estimating Incumbency Advantage and the Effect of Candidate Ethnicity on Turnout"
