= Jasjeet S. Sekhon =

American-Canadian scientist

- Education: University of British Columbia (B.A.); Cornell University (M.A., Ph.D.)
- Scientific career
- Fields: Statistics, Data Science, Machine Learning, Causal Inference, Political Science
- Workplaces: Harvard University; University of California, Berkeley; Yale University
- Doctoral advisor: Walter Mebane
- Doctoral students: Rocío Titiunik

Jasjeet "Jas" Singh Sekhon is a data scientist, political scientist, and statistician at Yale University. Sekhon is the Eugene Meyer Professor at Yale University, a fellow of the American Statistical Association, and a fellow of the Society for Political Methodology. Sekhon's primary research interests lie in causal inference, machine learning, and their intersection. He has also published research on their application in various fields including voting behavior, online experimentation, epidemiology, and medicine.

== Biography ==
Sekhon graduated with a B.A. from the University of British Columbia. In 1999, he earned a Ph.D. at Cornell University.

Sekhon's career in academia began in 1999, when he became an assistant professor at Harvard University. He stayed at Harvard until 2005 when he moved to UC Berkeley. At Berkeley, he was appointed as the Robson Professor of Political Science and Statistics in 2014. In 2018, he accepted a non-academic position at Bridgewater Associates, where he was chief scientist and head of AI/ML. In 2020, he left Berkeley to join Yale University, where he was appointed Meyer Professor of Political Science and Statistics and Data Science in 2021. He was named a fellow of the Society for Political Methodology in 2019 and a fellow of the American Statistical Association in 2021. In March 2026, Sekhon joined Google DeepMind as its chief strategy officer after leaving his executive role at Bridgewater, while also joining its board.

Sekhon has authored or co-authored dozens of journal articles and several widely used software packages. The topics of his scholarship include experimental research methods, machine learning for estimating causal effects, election fraud, and matching. His research has been widely cited.

== Research ==
Sekhon is best known for his research in causal inference and machine learning. His early research on causal inference focused on the role of matching, but he later wrote an article pointing out that matching is unable to address many of the problems (particularly the selection on observables assumption) that its proponents assume. Nevertheless, his Genetic Matching algorithm remains one of his most highly cited articles. As of 2021, his research focuses on developing interpretable and credible machine learning methods for estimating causal relationships.

One of Sekhon's first publications, a journal article in Digestive Diseases and Sciences, presented a novel treatment, glucocorticoid, for a rare disease that he suffered. Sekhon himself was the first case described in the article.

== Selected publications ==
- Sekhon, Jasjeet S. (2011). "Multivariate and Propensity Score Matching Software with Automated Balance Optimization: The Matching Package for R". Journal of Statistical Software. 42 (7). doi:10.18637/jss.v042.i07. S2CID 7056467.
- Diamond, Alexis; Sekhon, Jasjeet S. (July 2013). "Genetic Matching for Estimating Causal Effects: A General Multivariate Matching Method for Achieving Balance in Observational Studies". Review of Economics and Statistics. 95 (3): 932–945. doi:10.1162/REST_a_00318. S2CID 17681465.
- Sekhon, Jasjeet S. (June 2009). "Opiates for the Matches: Matching Methods for Causal Inference". Annual Review of Political Science. 12 (1): 487–508. doi:10.1146/annurev.polisci.11.060606.135444.
- Künzel, Sören; Sekhon, Jasjeet; Bickel, Peter; Yu, Bin (2019). "Metalearners for Estimating Heterogeneous Treatment Effects using Machine Learning". Proceedings of the National Academy of Sciences. 116 (10): 4156–4165. Bibcode:2019PNAS..116.4156K. doi:10.1073/pnas.1804597116. PMC 6410831. PMID 30770453.
- Caughey, Devin; Sekhon, Jasjeet S. (2011). "Elections and the Regression Discontinuity Design: Lessons from Close U.S. House Races, 1942–2008". Political Analysis. 19 (4): 385–408. doi:10.1093/pan/mpr032.
