= Wagner Noël Performing Arts Center =

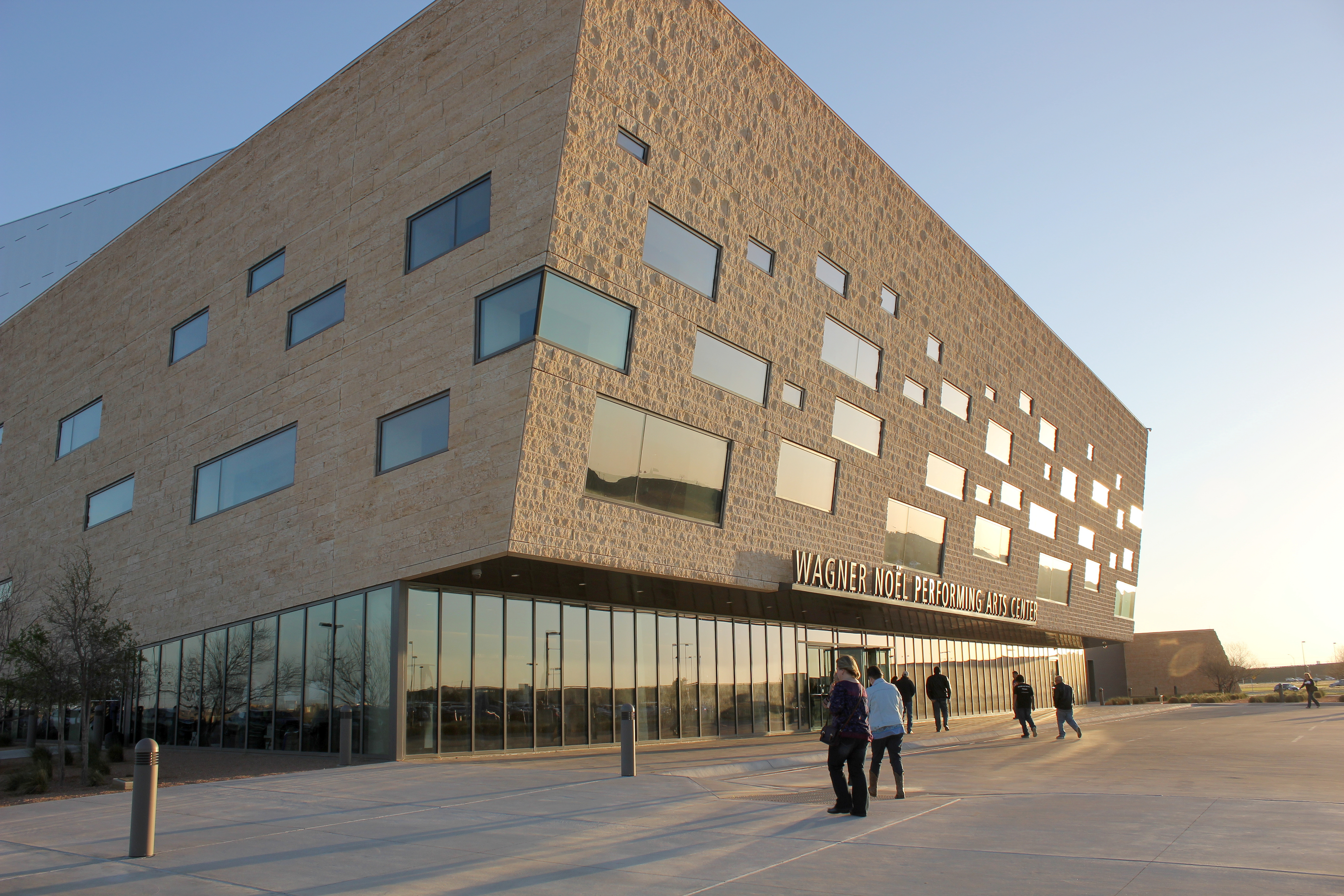

- Location within Texas

General information
- Location: Midland, Texas, 1310 N. FM1788, United States
- Coordinates: 31°58′12″N 102°14′48″W
- Current tenants: UTPB Music Department, Midland-Odessa Symphony & Chorale
- Construction started: September 2006
- Opened: August 12, 2011
- Cost: $81 million
- Owner: The University of Texas

Technical details
- Floor area: 108,500 ft^{2}

Design and construction
- Architecture firm: Boora Architects; Rhotenberry Wellen Architects
- Structural engineer: Walter P. Moore & Associates
- Civil engineer: Landgraf, Crutcher, and Associates
- Other designers: Jaffe Holden, Acoustics
- Main contractor: Hunt Construction

Website
- http://www.wagnernoel.com

The Wagner Noël Performing Arts Center (WNPAC) is a performing arts venue located between the cities of Midland, Texas and Odessa, Texas. WNPAC is owned by The University of Texas, and is built on a satellite campus of The University of Texas of the Permian Basin (UTPB). It houses an 1800-seat main concert hall and a 200-seat recital hall, and also houses the UTPB music department.

== Awards ==
2013 USITT Architecture Merit Award

== See also ==
- List of concert halls
