= Matias D. Cattaneo =

Econometrics and statistics scholar

- Born: May 16, 1978 (age 48); Buenos Aires, Argentina
- Spouse: Rocío Titiunik

Academic background
- Education: University of California, Berkeley (Ph.D. in Economics, M.A. in Statistics); UTDT; UBA
- Doctoral advisor: James L. Powell

Academic work
- Discipline: Econometrics; Statistics; Machine Learning; Data Science; Causal inference
- Institutions: Princeton University
- Website: Information at IDEAS / RePEc

Matias Damian Cattaneo (born May 16, 1978) is an Argentine scientist, Professor of Economics at Princeton University. His research focuses on econometrics, statistics, data science and decision science, with applications to program evaluation and causal inference. He is known for his work on Regression discontinuity designs and Nonparametric statistics.

Cattaneo is a co-editor of Econometric Theory, and has served in editorial boards of leading academic journals across various disciplines, including the Journal of the American Statistical Association, Econometrica, and Operations Research.

== Education and academic career ==
Cattaneo received his Licentiate from UBA in 2000, and his Ph.D. from the University of California, Berkeley in 2008, under supervision of James L. Powell. From 2008 to 2019, Cattaneo taught at the University of Michigan. He joined Princeton University as a Professor in the Department of Operations Research and Financial Engineering in 2019. He later moved to the Department of Economics in 2026.

== Honors and awards ==
- John Simon Guggenheim Memorial Foundation Fellowship, 2026.
- Elected Member, International Statistical Institute, 2025.
- Fellow, American Statistical Association, 2023.
- Fellow, Institute of Mathematical Statistics, 2022.
- Fellow, International Association for Applied Econometrics, 2022.
- Stata Journal Editors’ Prize, 2019.

== Publications ==
- Abadie, Alberto; Cattaneo, Matias D. (2018). "Econometric Methods for Program Evaluation". Annual Review of Economics. 10: 465–503. doi:10.1146/annurev-economics-080217-053402. hdl:1721.1/129481. S2CID 13815235.
- Calonico, Sebastian; Cattaneo, Matias D.; Titiunik, Rocio (2014). "Robust nonparametric confidence intervals for regression-discontinuity designs". Econometrica. 82 (6): 2295–2326. doi:10.3982/ECTA11757. hdl:2027.42/109857.
- Calonico, Sebastian; Cattaneo, Matias D.; Titiunik, Rocio (2015). "Optimal Data-Driven Regression Discontinuity Plots". Journal of the American Statistical Association. 110 (512): 1753–1769. doi:10.1080/01621459.2015.1017578. S2CID 13813472.
- Calonico, Sebastian; Cattaneo, Matias D.; Farrell, Max H. (2018). "On the effect of bias estimation on coverage accuracy in nonparametric inference". Journal of the American Statistical Association. 113 (522): 767–779. arXiv:1508.02973. doi:10.1080/01621459.2017.1285776. S2CID 13887146.
- Calonico, Sebastian; Cattaneo, Matias D.; Farrell, Max H.; Titiunik, Rocio (2019). "Regression discontinuity designs using covariates". Review of Economics and Statistics. 101 (3): 442–451. arXiv:1809.03904. doi:10.1162/rest_a_00760. S2CID 30717555.
- Cattaneo, Matias D. (2010). "Efficient semiparametric estimation of multi-valued treatment effects under ignorability". Journal of Econometrics. 155 (2): 138–154. doi:10.1016/j.jeconom.2009.09.023.
- Cattaneo, Matias D.; Jansson, Michael; Ma, Xinwei (2020). "Simple Local Polynomial Density Estimators". Journal of the American Statistical Association. 115 (531): 1449–1455. arXiv:1811.11512. doi:10.1080/01621459.2019.1635480. S2CID 85528533.
- Cattaneo, Matias D.; Idrobo, Nicolas; Titiunik, Rocio (2020). A Practical Introduction to Regression Discontinuity Designs: Foundations. Cambridge University Press. arXiv:1911.09511. doi:10.1017/9781108684606. ISBN 9781108684606. S2CID 208201961.
- Cattaneo, Matias D.; Idrobo, Nicolas; Titiunik, Rocio (2020). A Practical Introduction to Regression Discontinuity Designs: Extensions. Cambridge University Press. arXiv:2301.08958. doi:10.1017/9781009441896. ISBN 9781009441896. S2CID 256105360.
- Cattaneo, Matias D.; Titiunik, Rocio (2022). "Regression Discontinuity Designs". Annual Review of Economics. 14: 821–851. arXiv:2108.09400. doi:10.1146/annurev-economics-051520-021409. S2CID 125763727.
