= Janet M. Box-Steffensmeier =

American political scientist

Janet M. Box-Steffensmeier (née Box) is an American political scientist and Distinguished University Professor at the Ohio State University.

== Life ==
Box-Steffensmeier graduated magna cum laude from Coe College in mathematics and political science and received her Ph.D. from the department of government at the University of Texas in 1993 with her dissertation Candidates, Contributors, and Campaign Strategy: It's About Time.

In 2008 she was made a Fellow of the Society for Political Methodology and, received the Warren E. Miller Award for Meritorious Service to the Social Sciences from the Inter-university Consortium for Political and Social Research (ICPSR) in 2013. In 2017, she was elected to the American Academy of Arts and Sciences. She was elected President of the American Political Science Association in 2019 and her biography was published in PS: Political Science and Politics. Box-Steffensmeier was named the Vernal Riffe Professor of Political Science in 2003 at Ohio State University.
