= Keith T. Poole =

American political scientist (born 1947)

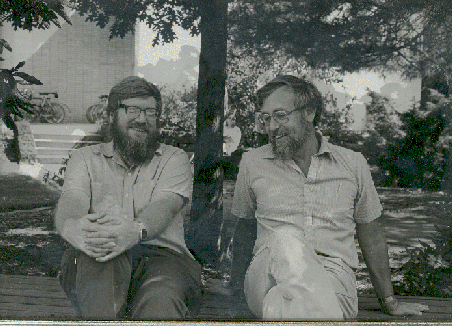
- Poole (left) and Howard Rosenthal in 1984
- Born: Keith Taylor Poole; 1947 (age 78–79); Newport, Oregon
- Education: Portland State University; University of Rochester
- Known for: NOMINATE (scaling method)
- Spouse: Janice K. Poole (m. 1972)
- Awards: Career Achievement Award from the Society for Political Methodology (2016)
- Scientific career
- Fields: Political science
- Institutions: University of Georgia
- Thesis: A Method for Testing the Equilibrium Theories of the Spatial Model of Party Competition (1978)

Keith T. Poole (born 1947) is an American political scientist and the Philip H. Alston Jr. Distinguished Professor in the Department of Political Science at the University of Georgia. He has compiled and maintained datasets related to the United States Congress for forty years, and he has made them available on his website, Voteview, since 1995. Poole originally developed Voteview as an MS-DOS program with Howard Rosenthal at Carnegie-Mellon University from 1989 to 1992. He also worked with Rosenthal on the development of the NOMINATE multidimensional scaling method to assess the voting behavior of members of Congress along a given dimension. He was inducted into the American Academy of Arts & Sciences in 2006. In 2016, he received the Society for Political Methodology's Career Achievement Award, and in 2018, the journal Public Choice published a special issue in his honor.

== Works ==
- Poole, Keith T., and Howard Rosenthal. Congress: A Political-Economic History of Roll Call Voting. New York: Oxford University Press, 1997.
- Poole, Keith T., and Howard Rosenthal. Ideology in Congress. New Brunswick, Transaction Press, 2007, 2nd Rev. Edition.
- McCarty, Nolan., Keith T. Poole and Howard Rosenthal. Political Bubbles: Financial Crises and the Failure of American Democracy, Princeton University Press, 2013.
- Armstrong II, David A., Ryan Bakker, Royce Carroll, Christopher Hare, Keith T. Poole and Howard Rosenthal. Analyzing Spatial Models of Choice and Judgment with R, CRC Press, 2014.
