= Globe of the Great Southwest =

Coordinates: 31°51′50″N 102°22′57″W

The Globe of the Great Southwest

The Globe of the Great Southwest is a theater in Odessa, Texas inspired by the Globe Theatre. As well, the complex has a replica of Anne Hathaway's cottage. Both buildings are located on the campus of Odessa College.

The Globe Theatre is a non-profit organization presenting classical and modern plays on an Elizabethan stage. It hosts community theater performances, monthly country-western shows called The Brand New Opree, and other community activities. The nearby Anne Hathaway Library, a replica of the cottage in which Shakespeare's wife lived, houses displays on the life and works of William Shakespeare. Full-time theatre activity began in the fall of 1968.

== History ==
The idea behind The Globe of the Great Southwest was first conceived in an English class at Odessa High School in the late 1950s:

A student brought to class a model of Shakespeare's Globe Theatre and commented to his instructor, Mrs. Marjorie Morris, then teaching in high school, that it would be exciting to have an actual life-size replica of the Globe right here in Odessa. This casual remark caught the imagination of Mrs. Morris and fired her with a zeal that eventually made her dream a reality.

The Globe under construction

The Globe Theatre organization and fundraising efforts for construction began in 1958. Its construction was completed as funds were raised and became available. "In 1966, when construction was not finished, director Paul Baker brought his production of Julius Caesar from the Dallas Theater Center to six sold-out performances at the Odessa Globe." The theatre began its first season in 1968.

The construction of the theatre was done with primarily wood and plaster. The building is a simplified and modernized version of its much larger Elizabethan namesake: both have an apron stage backed by a two-story fixed set that forms one side of an octagonal courtyard surrounded by wooden balconies. The theatrical term for the area directly behind the stage used by actors is the "inner above" - a term still used in theatre design today. The Globe Theater is octagonal with a covered courtyard containing fixed seats for 441 attendees and a single balcony, while the original London theater was a 20-sided polygon with an open-air courtyard where most attendees stood, and three balconies offered more expensive seats: total capacity may have been as high as 3,000.

As of 2022, it "is home of the annual Odessa Shakespeare Festival, the Odessa Brand New Opree, and the Permian Basin Opera." It mostly stages western classics and serves a local Latino student population in the area.
