= Odessa Flight Strip =

Military airfield in Odessa, Texas

Odessa Flight Strip
- Odessa, Texas

Site information
- Type: AAF Emergency Landing Airfield
- Controlled by: United States Army Air Forces

Location
- Coordinates: 31°50′28″N 102°23′30″W

Site history
- Built: 1942
- In use: 1942-1945

Odessa Flight Strip is a former military airfield located in Odessa, Texas. The airfield site has been redeveloped and is now part of the urban area of the city.

This was one of the many Flight Strips which were built by the USAAF during World War II for the emergency use of military aircraft.
