= Howard Rosenthal (psychotherapist) =

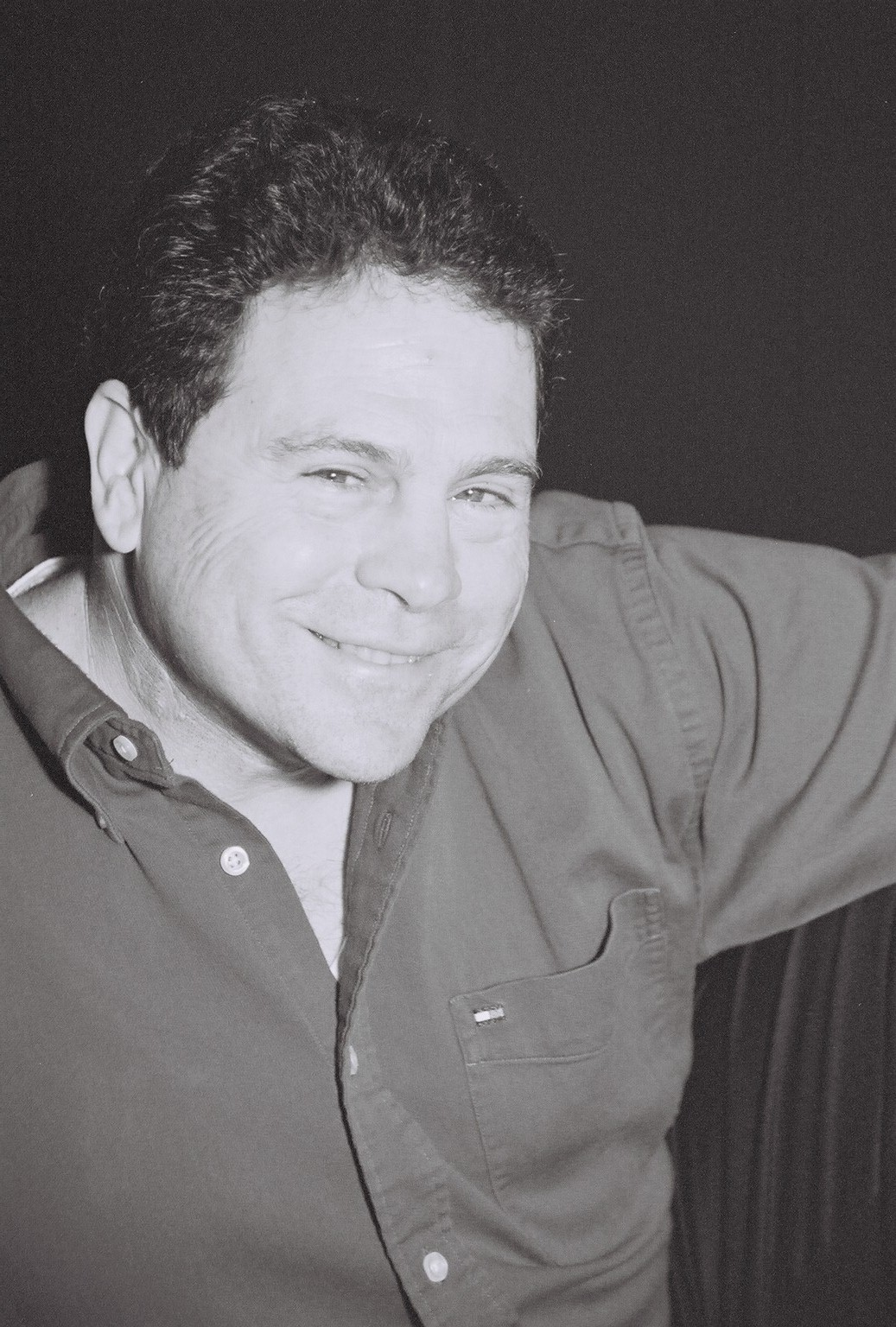
Dr. Howard Rosenthal

Howard Rosenthal is an American psychotherapist, Professor and Program Coordinator of Human Services and Addiction Studies at St. Louis Community College in Florissant, Missouri.

Rosenthal is the author of Encyclopedia of Counseling (dubbed “the purple book” because the color of the cover) by counselors and educators. He has also written review books for mental health professionals preparing for certification examinations, a Human Services Dictionary, and other professional books including Favorite Counseling and Therapy Techniques, and books for a general audience on suicide prevention.

== Publications ==
- Rosenthal, H.G. (1988). Not with my life I don't: Preventing your suicide and that of others. Muncie IN: Accelerated Development.
- Rosenthal, H.G. & Hollis, J.W. (1994). Help yourself to positive mental health. Muncie, IN: Accelerated Development.
- Rosenthal, H.G. (2003). Human services dictionary. New York: Routledge.
- Rosenthal, H.G. (2005). Before you see your first client: 55 things counselors, therapists, and human service workers need to know. New York: Brunner Routledge.
- Rosenthal, H.G. (2006). Therapy's best: Practical advice and gems of wisdom from twenty accomplished counselors and therapists. New York: Routledge.
- Rosenthal, H.G. (2009). Special 15th anniversary edition, Encyclopedia of counseling. (3rd ed.) New York: Routledge. According to WorldCat, the book is held in 496 libraries
- Rosenthal, H.G. (2009). Special 15th anniversary edition, Vital information and review questions for the NCE, CPCE and state counseling exams.New York: Routledge.
- Rosenthal, H.G. (2011). Favorite counseling and therapy techniques. (2nd ed.) New York: Routledge.
- Rosenthal, H.G. (2011) Favorite Counseling and therapy homework assignments. (2nd ed.) New York: Routledge.
