= Odessa, Texas =

City in Texas, United States

- City
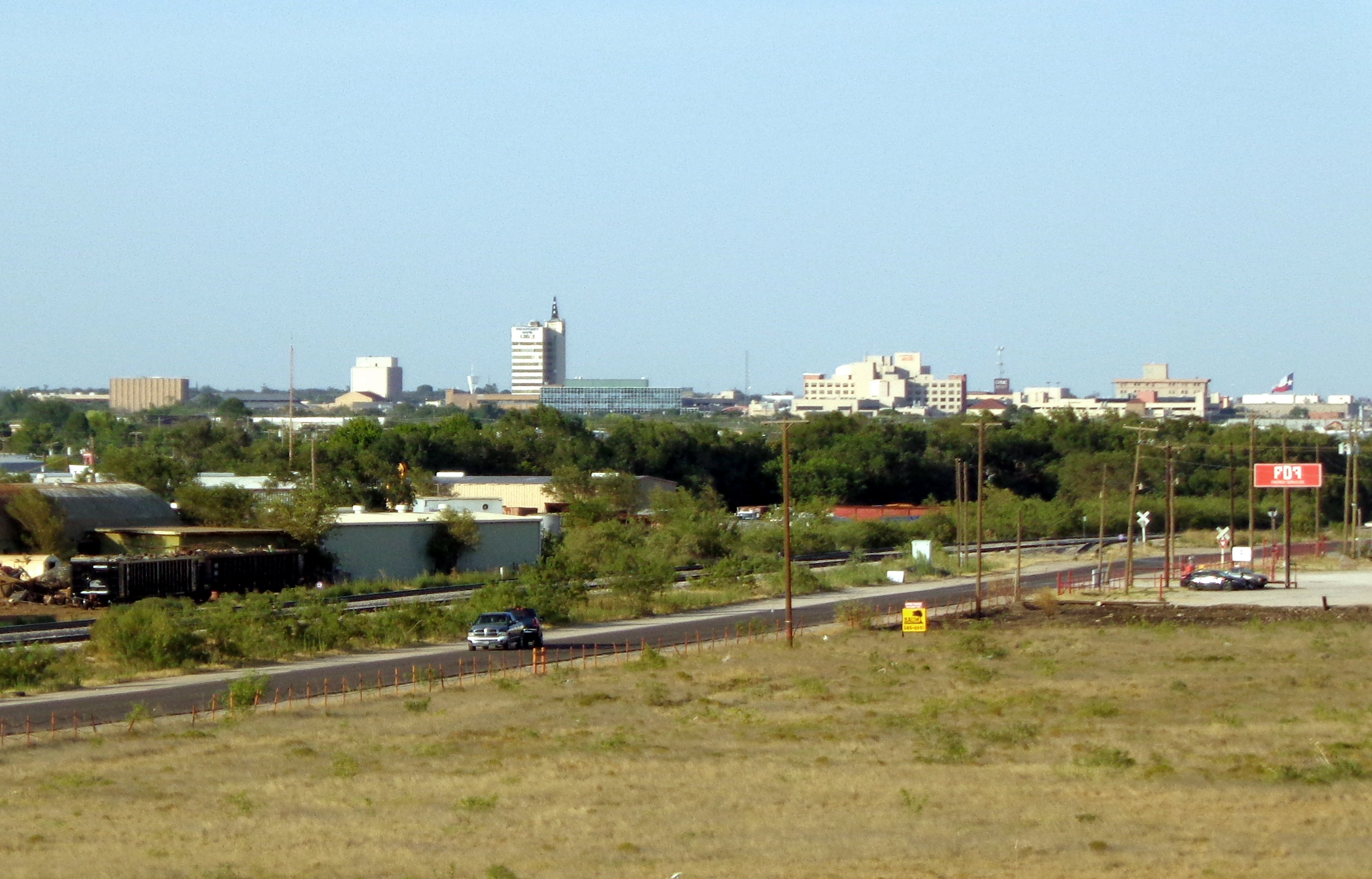
- Odessa skyline, looking east from TX-302

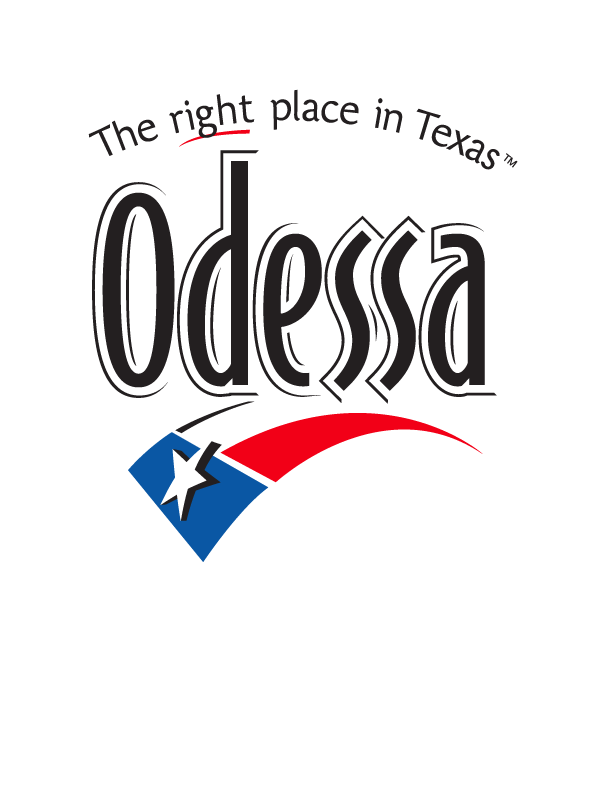
- Seal
- Nickname: The Jackrabbit-Roping Capital of Texas
- Interactive map of Odessa, Texas
- Location within Texas Location within the United States
- Coordinates: 31°51′48″N 102°21′56″W
- Country: United States
- State: Texas
- Counties: Ector, Midland
- Named for: Odessa, Russian Empire (present-day Ukraine)

Government
  - Type: Council–manager
  - City Council: Mayor Cal Hendrick; Eddie Mitchell; Steven P. Thompson; Chris Hanie; Gilbert Vasquez; Greg Connell
  - At-Large: Craig Stoker

Area
  - Total: 51.36 sq mi (133.02 km^{2})
  - Land: 51.08 sq mi (132.29 km^{2})
  - Water: 0.28 sq mi (0.72 km^{2})
- Elevation: 2,900 ft (884 m)

Population (2020)
  - Total: 114,428
  - Density: 2,414.6/sq mi (932.29/km^{2})
- Time zone: UTC−6 (CST)
  - Summer (DST): UTC−5 (CDT)
- ZIP Codes: 79760–79769
- Area code: 432
- FIPS code: 48-53388
- GNIS feature ID: 1343067
- Website: odessa-tx.gov

Odessa (/ˌoʊˈdɛsə/) is a city in the U.S. state of Texas. It is the county seat of Ector County in West Texas, with portions extending into Midland County. The population was 114,428 at the 2020 census, making it the 34th-most populous city in Texas. It is the principal city of the Odessa metropolitan statistical area, which includes all of Ector County. The metropolitan area is also a component of the larger Midland–Odessa combined statistical area, which had 359,001 residents in 2020.

The city is famous for being featured in the book Friday Night Lights: A Town, a Team, and a Dream, and the movie adaptation, Friday Night Lights. The University of Texas Permian Basin is located in the city and enrolls over 5,000 students. In 1948, Odessa was also the home of First Lady Barbara Bush, and the one-time home of former U.S. presidents George H. W. Bush and George W. Bush. Former president George H. W. Bush has been quoted as saying, "At Odessa we became Texans and proud of it."

== History ==
Odessa was founded in 1881 as a water stop and cattle-shipping point on the Texas and Pacific Railway. Odessa is said to have been named after Odessa in what was at the time Russian Empire (present-day Odesa, Ukraine). The settlement was named by Russian workers building the railway in 1881, because the terrain reminded them of their homeland; the local shortgrass prairies resembled the steppes of the Russian Empire.

The first post office opened in 1885. Odessa became the county seat of Ector County in 1891 when the county was first organized. It was incorporated as a city in 1927, after oil was discovered in Ector County on the Connell Ranch southwest of Odessa.

With the opening of the Penn Field in 1929 and the Cowden Field in 1930, oil became a major draw for new residents. In 1925, the population was just 750; by 1929, it had risen to 5,000. For the rest of the 20th century, the city's population and economy grew rapidly during each of a succession of oil booms (roughly in the 1930s–1950s, 1970s, and 2010s), often with accompanying contractions during the succeeding busts (particularly in the 1960s and 1980s).

== Geography ==
Odessa is located along the southwestern edge of the Llano Estacado in West Texas. It is situated above the Permian Basin, a large sedimentary deposit that contains significant reserves of oil and natural gas.

According to the United States Census Bureau, the city has a total area of 44.0 square miles (114 km^{2}); 43.9 square miles (114 km^{2}) are land and 0.1 square miles (0.26 km^{2}) (0.05%) is covered by water.

=== Climate ===
Odessa has a hot semiarid climate typical of West Texas. Summers are hot and sunny, while winters are cool and dry. Most rainfall occurs in late spring and summer; snowfall is rare. The area exhibits a large diurnal temperature range and frequent high winds.

Climate data for Odessa, Texas, 1991–2020 normals, extremes 1950–present
Month	Jan	Feb	Mar	Apr	May	Jun	Jul	Aug	Sep	Oct	Nov	Dec	Year
Record high °F (°C)	83 (28)	89 (32)	99 (37)	101 (38)	113 (45)	112 (44)	110 (43)	109 (43)	110 (43)	102 (39)	88 (31)	85 (29)	113 (45)
Mean maximum °F (°C)	76.0 (24.4)	80.4 (26.9)	87.1 (30.6)	93.6 (34.2)	100.1 (37.8)	104.0 (40.0)	101.6 (38.7)	101.5 (38.6)	97.3 (36.3)	91.4 (33.0)	81.6 (27.6)	74.8 (23.8)	105.6 (40.9)
Mean daily maximum °F (°C)	56.9 (13.8)	62.0 (16.7)	70.8 (21.6)	79.3 (26.3)	86.6 (30.3)	94.0 (34.4)	94.0 (34.4)	92.9 (33.8)	85.3 (29.6)	77.0 (25.0)	66.0 (18.9)	57.9 (14.4)	76.9 (24.9)
Daily mean °F (°C)	44.6 (7.0)	49.1 (9.5)	57.4 (14.1)	65.1 (18.4)	73.8 (23.2)	81.0 (27.2)	82.4 (28.0)	81.4 (27.4)	73.8 (23.2)	65.1 (18.4)	53.7 (12.1)	45.6 (7.6)	64.4 (18.0)
Mean daily minimum °F (°C)	32.2 (0.1)	36.2 (2.3)	44.0 (6.7)	50.9 (10.5)	61.0 (16.1)	68.1 (20.1)	70.8 (21.6)	69.9 (21.1)	62.4 (16.9)	53.1 (11.7)	41.4 (5.2)	33.3 (0.7)	51.9 (11.1)
Mean minimum °F (°C)	19.1 (−7.2)	22.0 (−5.6)	29.4 (−1.4)	37.1 (2.8)	46.1 (7.8)	61.4 (16.3)	63.8 (17.7)	63.6 (17.6)	52.9 (11.6)	37.6 (3.1)	25.8 (−3.4)	20.7 (−6.3)	14.0 (−10.0)
Record low °F (°C)	2 (−17)	−5 (−21)	16 (−9)	22 (−6)	31 (−1)	50 (10)	55 (13)	53 (12)	43 (6)	15 (−9)	11 (−12)	5 (−15)	−5 (−21)
Average precipitation inches (mm)	0.68 (17)	0.54 (14)	0.67 (17)	0.70 (18)	1.62 (41)	1.00 (25)	1.47 (37)	1.61 (41)	1.53 (39)	1.27 (32)	0.61 (15)	0.58 (15)	12.28 (311)
Average snowfall inches (cm)	0.2 (0.51)	0.2 (0.51)	0.0 (0.0)	0.0 (0.0)	0.0 (0.0)	0.0 (0.0)	0.0 (0.0)	0.0 (0.0)	0.0 (0.0)	0.0 (0.0)	0.2 (0.51)	0.3 (0.76)	0.9 (2.29)
Average precipitation days (≥ 0.01 in)	3.4	3.4	3.1	2.6	3.7	3.9	4.3	4.1	5.4	3.8	2.9	2.8	43.4
Average snowy days (≥ 0.1 in)	0.0	0.0	0.0	0.0	0.0	0.0	0.0	0.0	0.0	0.0	0.0	0.2	0.2
Source 1: NOAA
Source 2: National Weather Service

== Demographics ==
Historical population
Census	Pop.	Note	%±
1930	2,407		—
1940	9,573		297.7%
1950	29,495		208.1%
1960	80,338		172.4%
1970	78,380		−2.4%
1980	90,027		14.9%
1990	89,699		−0.4%
2000	90,943		1.4%
2010	99,940		9.9%
2020	114,428		14.5%
U.S. Census Bureau Texas Almanac

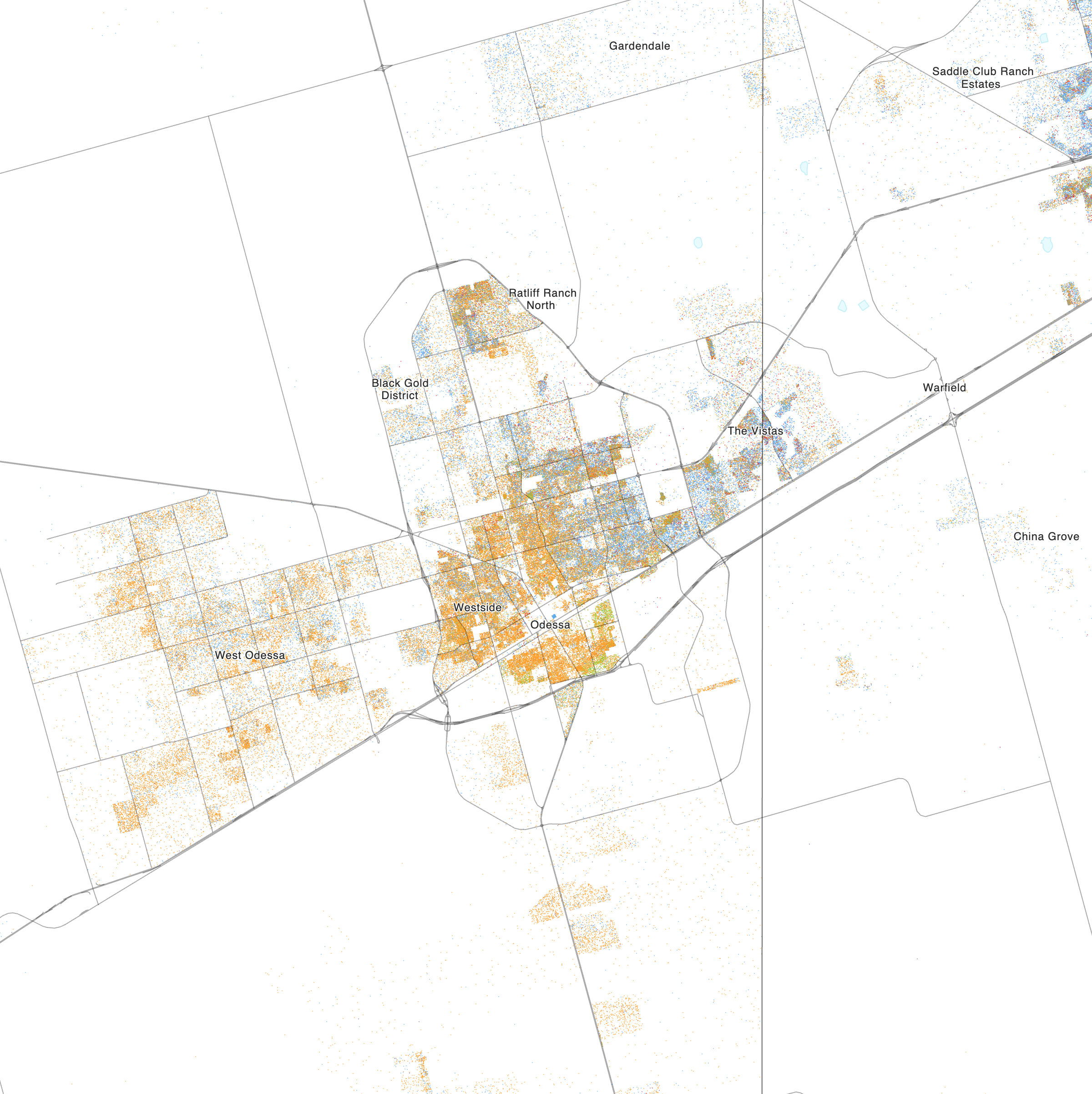
Map of racial distribution in Odessa, 2020 U.S. census. Each dot is one person: ⬤ White ⬤ Black ⬤ Asian ⬤ Hispanic ⬤ Multiracial ⬤ Native American/Other

=== Racial and ethnic composition ===
Odessa city, Texas – Racial and ethnic composition Note: the US Census treats Hispanic/Latino as an ethnic category. This table excludes Latinos from the racial categories and assigns them to a separate category. Hispanics/Latinos may be of any race.
Race / Ethnicity (NH = Non-Hispanic)	Pop 2000	Pop 2010	Pop 2020	% 2000	% 2010	% 2020
White alone (NH)	46,179	41,492	37,390	50.78%	41.52%	32.68%
Black or African American alone (NH)	5,165	5,330	7,007	5.68%	5.33%	6.12%
Native American or Alaska Native alone (NH)	372	445	424	0.41%	0.45%	0.37%
Asian alone (NH)	775	1,056	2,452	0.85%	1.06%	2.14%
Pacific Islander alone (NH)	22	92	258	0.02%	0.09%	0.23%
Some Other Race alone (NH)	24	52	357	0.03%	0.05%	0.31%
Mixed race or Multiracial (NH)	735	872	2,296	0.81%	0.87%	2.01%
Hispanic or Latino (any race)	37,671	50,601	64,244	41.42%	50.63%	56.14%
Total	90,843	99,940	114,428	100.00%	100.00%	100.00%

=== 2020 census ===
As of the 2020 United States census, there were 114,428 people, and the median age was 33.0 years. 26.6% of residents were under the age of 18 and 11.3% of residents were 65 years of age or older. For every 100 females there were 101.9 males, and for every 100 females age 18 and over there were 100.4 males age 18 and over.

99.9% of residents lived in urban areas, while 0.1% lived in rural areas.

There were 41,126 households in Odessa, of which 38.0% had children under the age of 18 living in them. Of all households, 46.5% were married-couple households, 20.8% were households with a male householder and no spouse or partner present, and 25.5% were households with a female householder and no spouse or partner present. About 25.0% of all households were made up of individuals and 8.3% had someone living alone who was 65 years of age or older.

There were 47,309 housing units, of which 13.1% were vacant. The homeowner vacancy rate was 1.9% and the rental vacancy rate was 21.3%.

Racial composition as of the 2020 census
Race	Number	Percent
White	56,783	49.6%
Black or African American	7,512	6.6%
American Indian and Alaska Native	1,134	1.0%
Asian	2,523	2.2%
Native Hawaiian and Other Pacific Islander	277	0.2%
Some other race	21,273	18.6%
Two or more races	24,926	21.8%
Hispanic or Latino (of any race)	64,244	56.1%

By 2020, the racial and ethnic makeup reflected statewide and national trends toward greater diversification.

=== 2020 American Community Survey ===
The 2020 American Community Survey estimated the median household income increased to $63,829 with a mean income of $82,699.

=== 2010 census ===
As of the 2010 census, 99,940 people, 35,216 households, and 27,412 families resided in the city. The population density was 2,276.5 inhabitants per square mile (879.0/km^{2}). There were 43,687 housing units at an average density of 995.1 per square mile (384.2/km^{2}).

In 2010, the racial makeup of the city was 75.4% White, 5.7% Black, 1.1% Asian, 1.0% Native American, 0.1% Pacific Islander, 14.2% from other races, and 2.5% from two or more races. Hispanic or Latino residents of any race was 50.6%.

Of the 35,216 households in 2010, 37.9% had children under the age of 18 living with them, 51.6% were married couples living together, 14.5% had a female householder with no husband present, and 29.6% were not families. About 25.7% of all households were made up of individuals, and 9.6% had someone living alone who was 65 years of age or older. The average household size was 2.65, and the average family size was 3.21. The population was distributed as 29.8% under the age of 18, 10.6% from 18 to 24, 27.8% from 25 to 44, 20.0% from 45 to 64, and 11.8% who were 65 years of age or older. The median age was 32 years. For every 100 females, there were 93.2 males. For every 100 females age 18 and over, there were 88.6 males age 18 and over.

=== 2000 census ===
At the 2000 census, the median income for a household in the city was $31,209, and the median income for a family was $36,869. Males had a median income of $31,115 versus $21,743 for females. The per capita income for the city was $16,096. About 16.0% of families and 18.6% of the population were below the poverty line, including 23.9% of those under age 18 and 14.1% of those age 65 or over.

== Economy ==
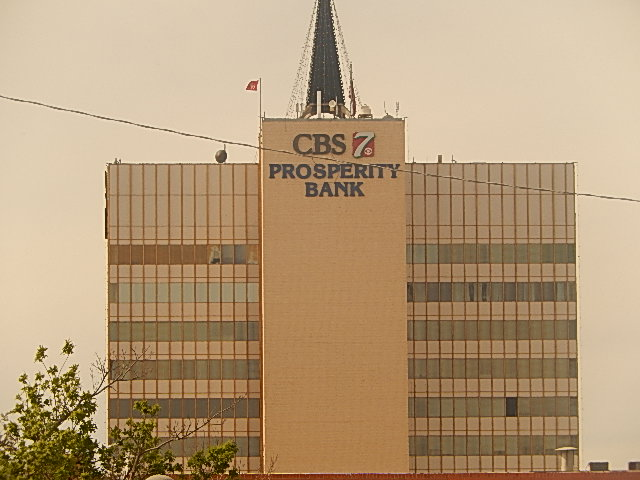
Prosperity Bank Building is the tallest building in Odessa.

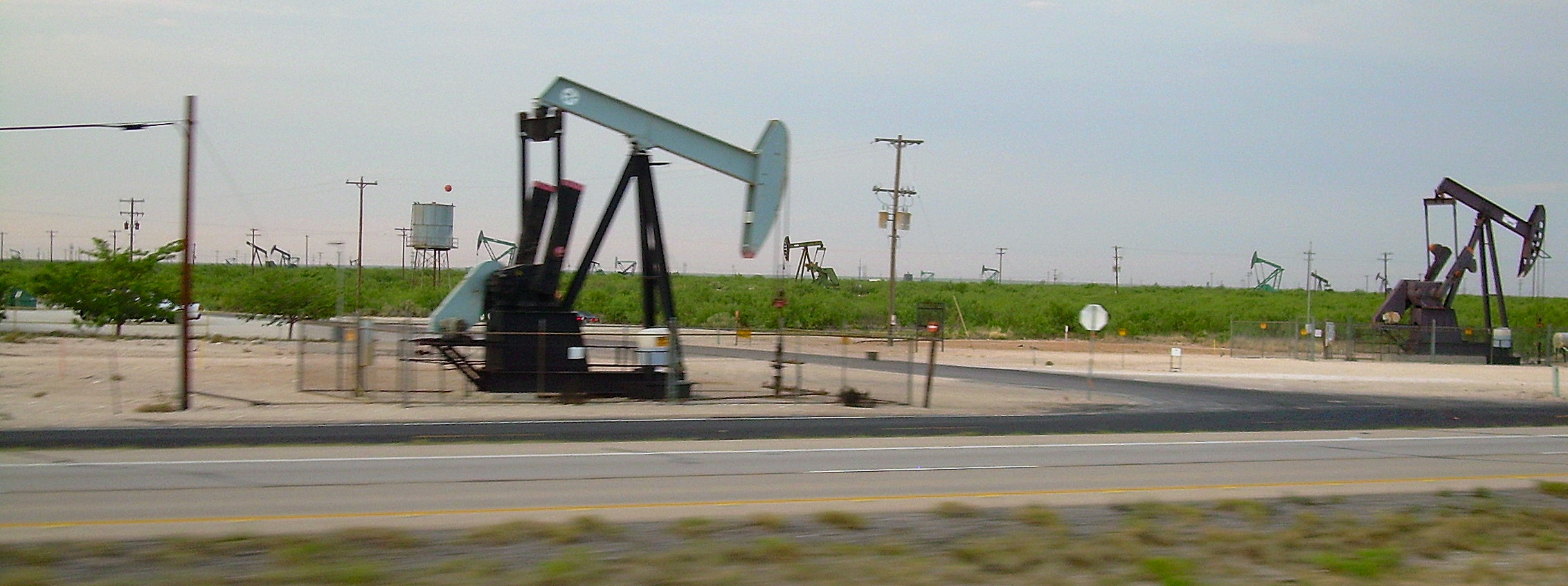
Oil Pumpjacks seen in an oil field in Penwell, west of Odessa in 2006. The oil industry has been a significant part of Odessa's economy since the 1920s.

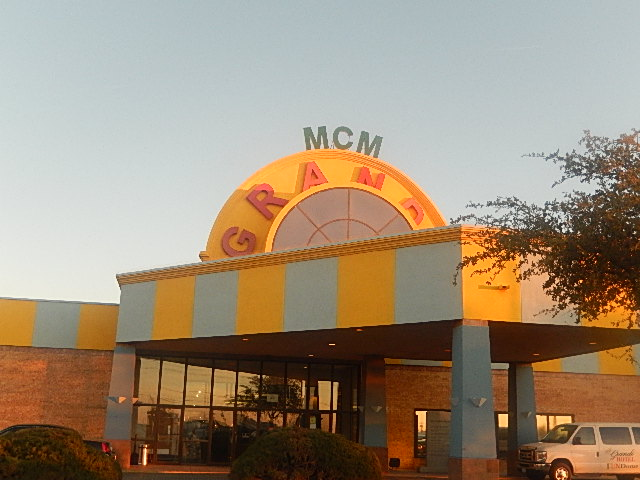
MCM Grande Hotel in Odessa includes the West Texas Events Center.

Historically, the Odessa economy has been primarily driven by the area's oil industry, booming and busting in response to rises and falls in the crude oil price. Many of the city's largest employers are oilfield supply companies and petrochemical processing companies. In recent decades, city leaders have begun trying to decrease the city's reliance on the energy industry to moderate the boom-bust cycle and develop greater economic sustainability.

Odessa has also taken steps to diversify the energy it produces. In 2009, a wind farm was constructed in northern Ector County. Around the same time, a coal pollution mitigation plant had been announced for a site previously entered in the Futuregen bidding. The plant will be run by Summit Power and will be located near Penwell. This plant was supposed to lead to the creation of 8,000 jobs in the area. Plans were also in place for a small nuclear reactor called the High-Temperature Teaching and Test Reactor to be run as a test and teaching facility in conjunction with the nuclear engineering department at University of Texas of the Permian Basin.

Odessa's main enclosed shopping mall, Music City Mall, used to include an indoor ice skating rink.

=== Largest employers ===
As in many municipalities, some of the largest employers are in the education, government, and healthcare industries. Outside of those areas, the city's major employers are concentrated in the oil industry. According to the city's 2021 Comprehensive Annual Financial Report, the top employers in the city were:

#	Employer	Number of employees
1	Ector County Independent School District	4,163
2	Medical Center Hospital	1,977
3	Halliburton	1,400
4	NexTier (formerly Keane Group)	1,142
5	City of Odessa	900
6	Saulsbury Companies	874
7	Odessa Regional Medical Center	800
8	Ector County	735
9	H-E-B	721
10	University of Texas Permian Basin	619

== Arts and culture ==
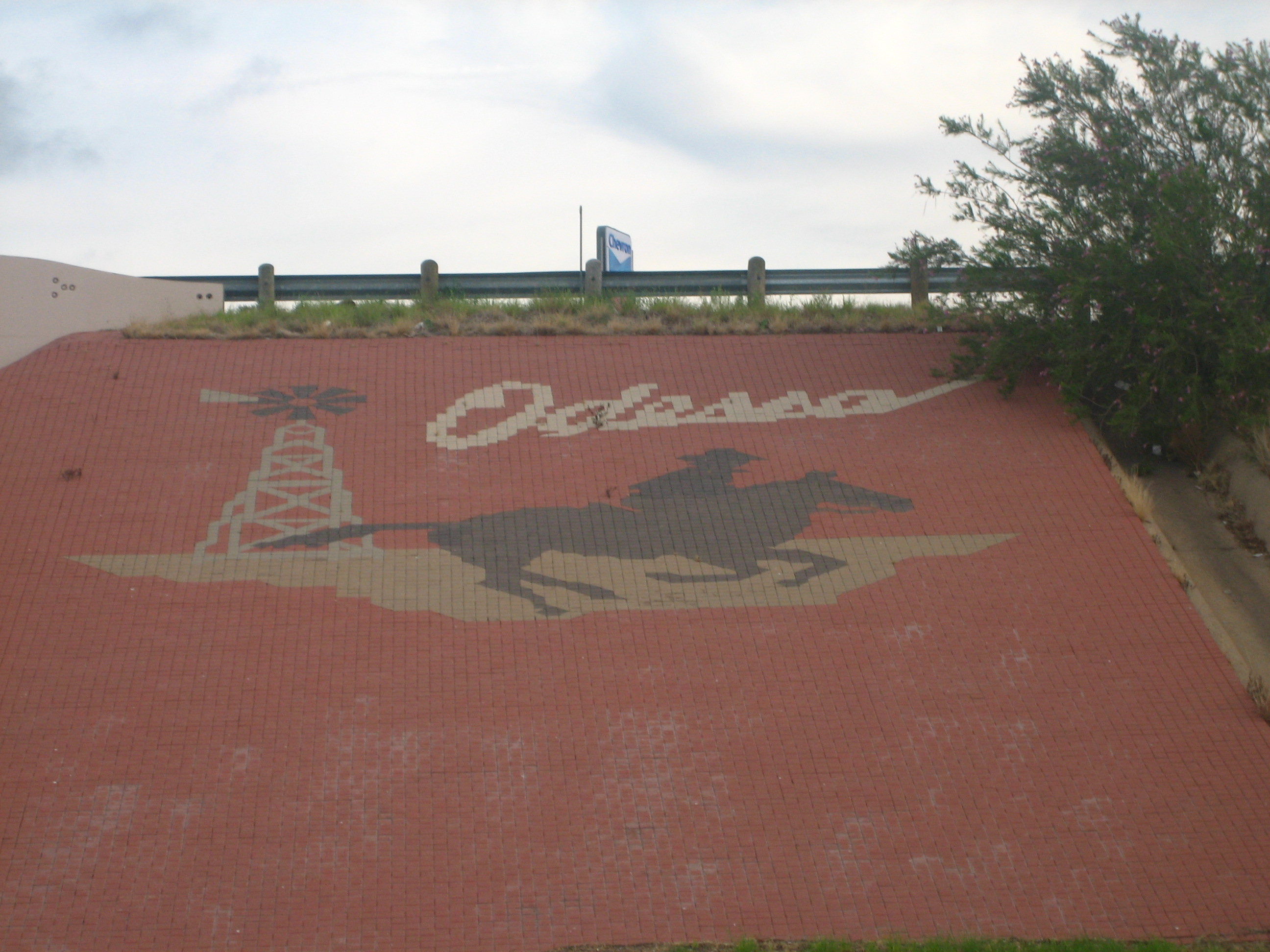
Odessa welcome sign along Interstate 20

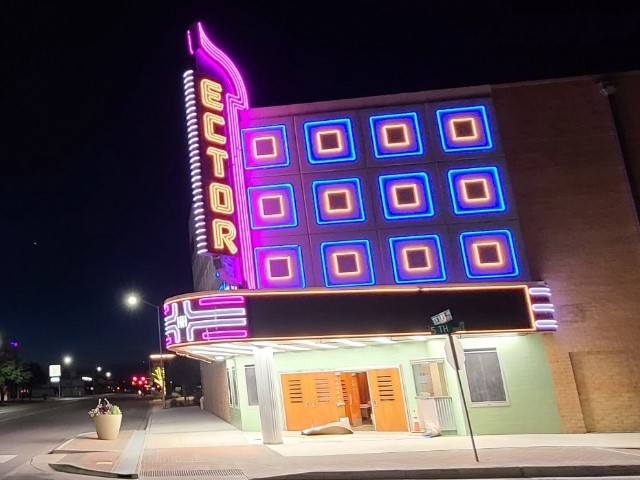
Ector Theater opened in 1951. Now closed for regular films, it still hosts occasional community events, performing arts, and musical expositions. The theater is undergoing a major renovation and is now attached to the Marriott Hotel and Conference Center.

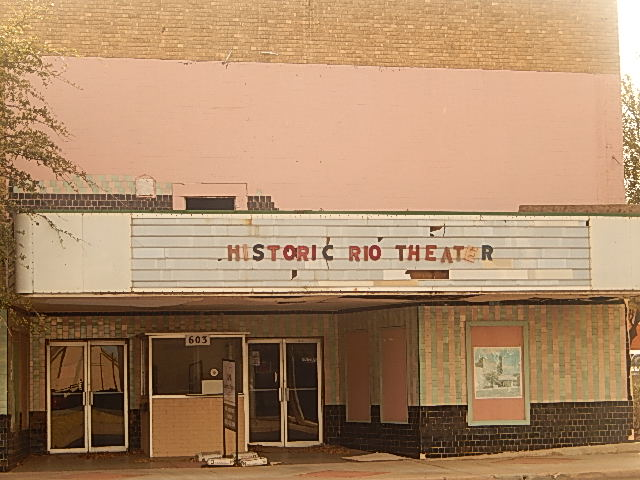
The abandoned Rio Theater on North Grant Street in Odessa opened in 1947 as the Scott Theater.

=== Performing arts ===
The Midland–Odessa Symphony and Chorale (MOSC) was founded in 1962, and is the region's largest orchestral organization, presenting both pops and masterworks concerts. The MOSC has three resident chamber ensembles: the Lone Star Brass, Permian Basin String Quartet, and West Texas Winds.

The Globe of the Great Southwest, located on the campus of Odessa College, features a replica of William Shakespeare's Globe Theatre. It hosts plays, and features an annual Shakespeare festival. Other theaters include the Ector Theater, built in 1951, and the Permian Playhouse.

=== Tourism ===
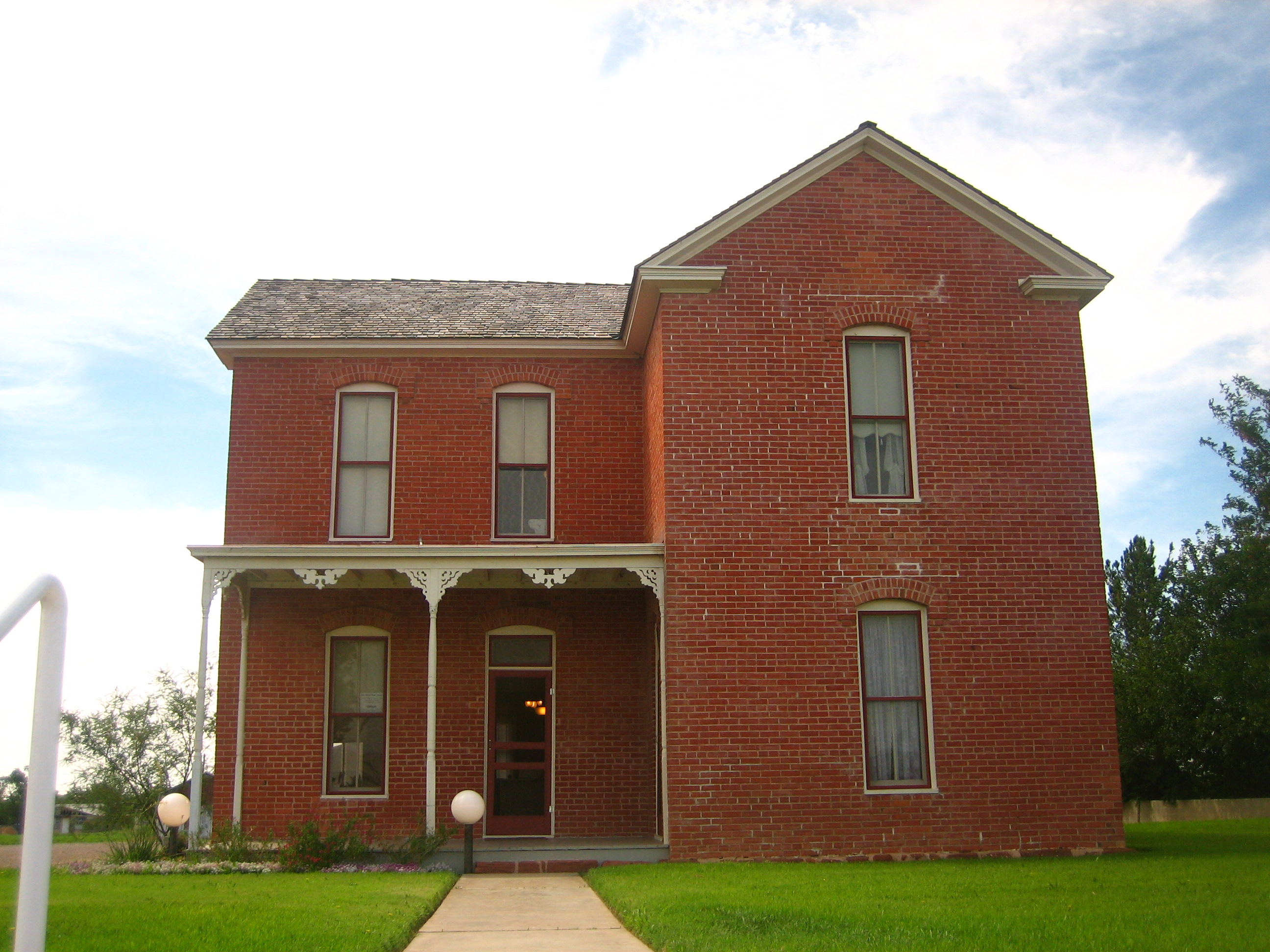
The White-Pool House, built in 1887, is the oldest structure still standing in Odessa. Open to visitors at 112 East Murphy Street near South Grant Avenue, the building is listed on the National Register of Historic Places.

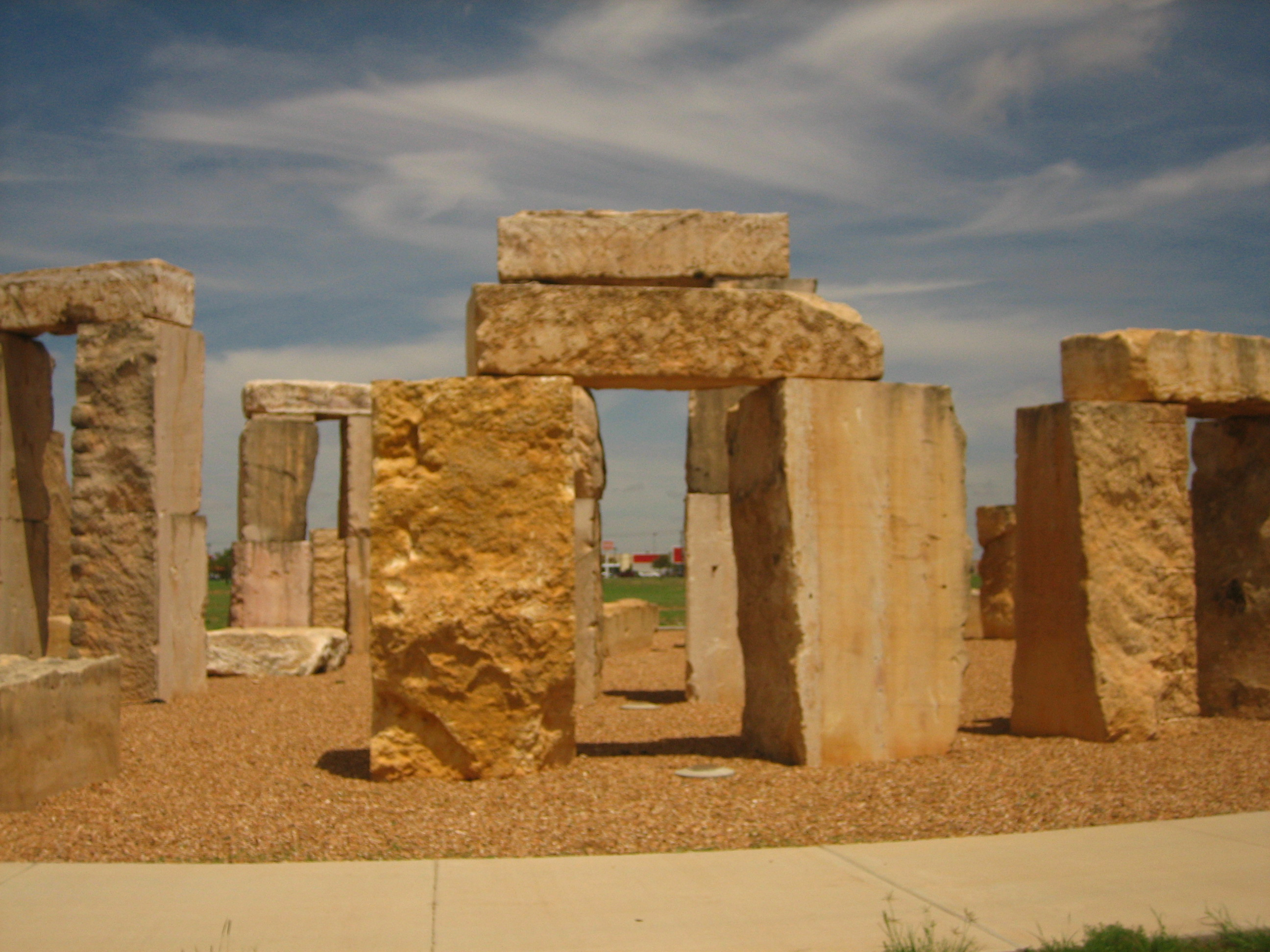
Stonehenge replica on campus of the University of Texas of the Permian Basin

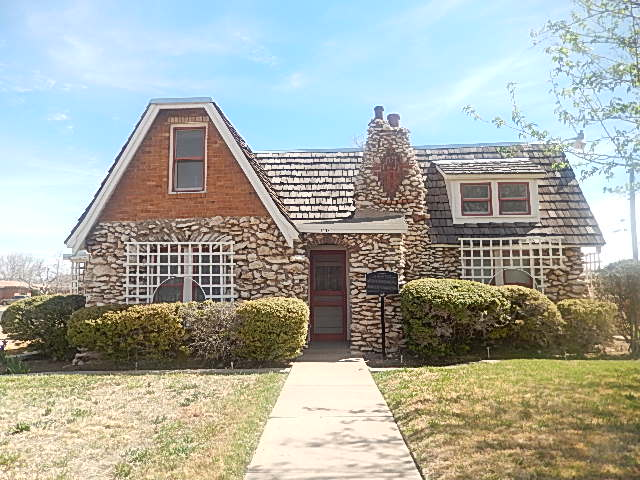
Parker Ranch House Museum was once the headquarters of a ranch that included 175 sections of land in Andrews and Ector Counties. Owned from the 1930s to the 1950s by Jim and Bessie Parker, the museum features exhibits of the ranching family.

Odessa's Presidential Museum and Leadership Library, on the campus of the University of Texas of the Permian Basin, is dedicated to the office of the Presidency. It also has displays about the presidents of the Republic of Texas.

Texon Santa Fe Depot honors the old west and its railroads.

The Parker House Museum features the lifestyle of a prominent ranching family in from the early 1900s.

Odessa Meteor Crater, an impact crater 550 feet (170 m) in diameter, is located southwest of the city.

Odessa has 31 jackrabbits statues, as part of an art project launched in 2004.

=== Libraries ===
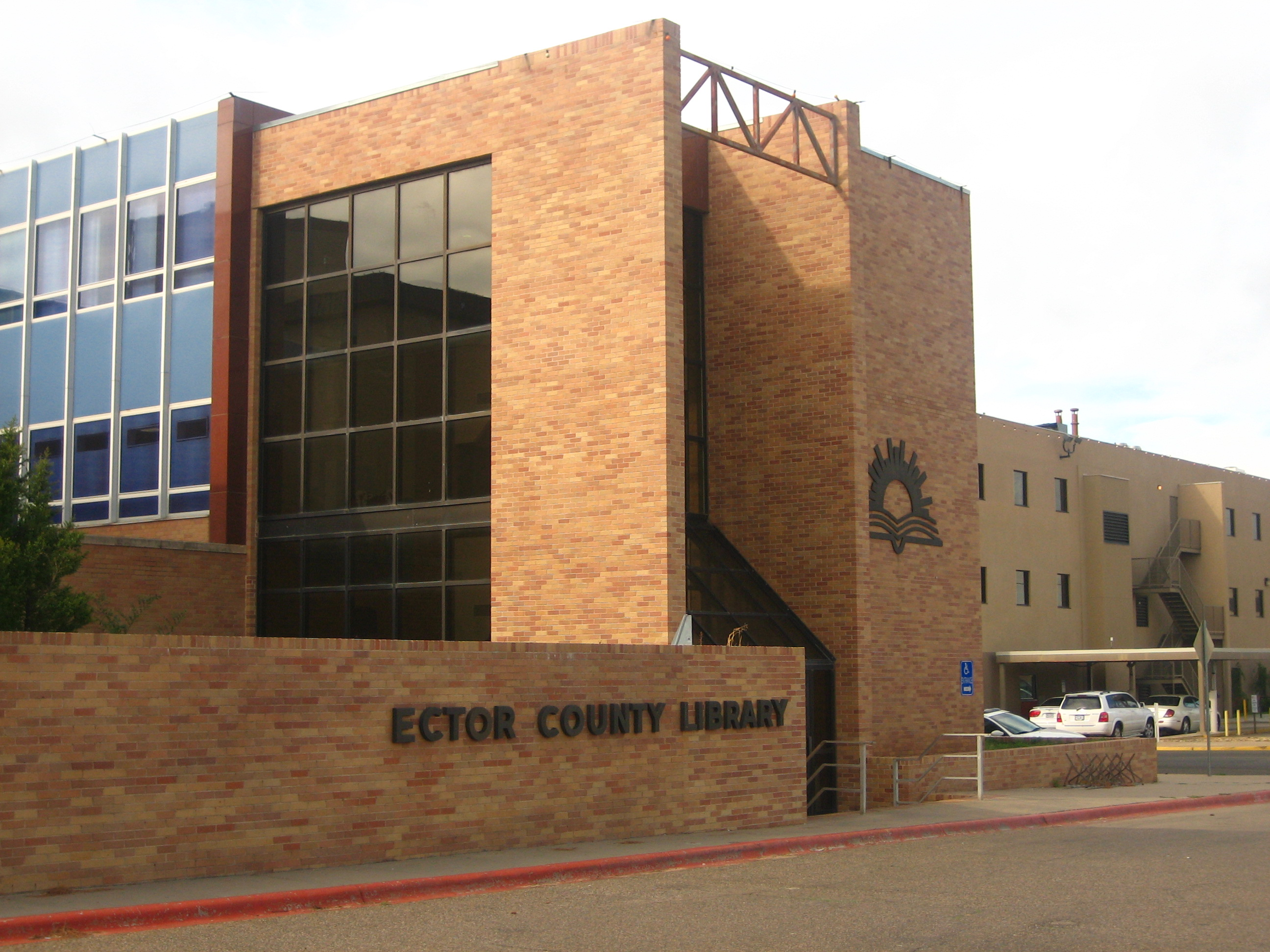
Ector County Library in downtown Odessa

- Ector County Library
- Murry H. Fly Learning Resource Center
- The J. Conrad Dunagan Library

== Sports ==
The Odessa Jackalopes, a Tier ll junior ice hockey team plays its home games at Ector County Coliseum, which was also home to the Indoor Football League’s Odessa/West Texas Roughnecks, the West Texas Wildcatters of the Lone Star Football League and the West Texas Desert Hawks indoor football team and member of the 2024 version of the Arena Football League. High-school football is held at Ratliff Stadium, which was featured in the movie Friday Night Lights. It is home to the Odessa Bronchos and the Permian Panthers. It is one of the largest high-school stadiums in the state, listed as seventh in capacity within Texas.

== Government ==
=== Local government ===
Odessa has a council–manager government, with a city council of five councillors (elected from geographic districts) and a mayor (elected at-large). The council appoints and directs other city officials, including the city manager, and sets the city's budget, taxes, and other policies.

In the 2014 fiscal year, the Odessa government had $179.1 million in revenues, $146.3 million in expenditures, $454 million in total assets, and $203 million in total liabilities. The city's major sources of public revenues were fees for services (such as public utilities), sales taxes, and property taxes, and its major expenses were for public safety and for water and sewer service.

On December 14, 2022, the Odessa City Council voted to make Odessa a "sanctuary city for the unborn." In a 6–1 vote, Mayor Javier Joven and council members Denise Swanner, Mark Matta, Gilbert Vasquez, Chris Hanie, and Greg Connell established Odessa as the 62nd city to "outlaw" abortion. The new city ordinance makes a person civilly liable if any person aids, abets, or assists anybody in an abortion operation.

In October 2024, the city gained national attention after voting 5–2 to implement a transgender bathroom ban, in which any transgender person found using a publicly owned bathroom not matching their assigned gender at birth could be charged with trespassing. The ban was particularly notable for creating a private right to sue, under which any cisgender individual may seek damages from the transgender person of at minimum $10,000 in addition to attorney and court fees. A month later, they expanded the law to cover all restrooms public or private, and allow anyone to sue regardless of if they're an Odessa or even Texas resident.

=== State and federal facilities ===
The Texas Department of Criminal Justice operates the Odessa District Parole Office in Odessa.

The United States Postal Service operates three post offices in Odessa: Odessa, Northeast Odessa, and West Odessa.

== Education ==
=== Colleges and universities ===
The University of Texas Permian Basin (UTPB) began in 1973. UTPB was an upper level and graduate university until the Texas Legislature passed a bill in spring 1991 to allow the university to accept freshmen and sophomores. As of 2006, the university was holding discussions with the Nuclear Regulatory Commission about the construction of a new High-Temperature Teaching and Test Reactor, which if successful, would finish licensing and construction around 2012. It would be the first university-based research reactor to be built in the US in roughly a decade, and be one of the few HTGR-type reactors in the world. In January 2006, UTPB's School of Business was awarded accreditation by the Association to Advance Collegiate Schools of Business International, which is generally regarded as the premier accreditation agency for the world's business schools. According to the university, only 30% of business schools in the United States, and 15% of world business schools, have received AACSB accreditation.

The Texas Tech University Health Sciences Center Permian Basin Campus opened as a school of medicine in 1979, beginning in the basement of Medical Center Hospital. Since 1994, TTUHSC Permian Basin has included a school of allied health, offering a master's degree in physical therapy. Also, on the campus of Midland College, it offers a physician-assistant program. Additionally, TTUHSC Permian Basin includes a school of nursing focusing on primary care and rural health. In June 1999, the Texas Tech Health Center opened as a clinic, providing increased access to primary and specialized health care for the Permian Basin. Texas Tech University Health Sciences Center Permian Basin also operates 21 WIC clinics located in nearby small communities.

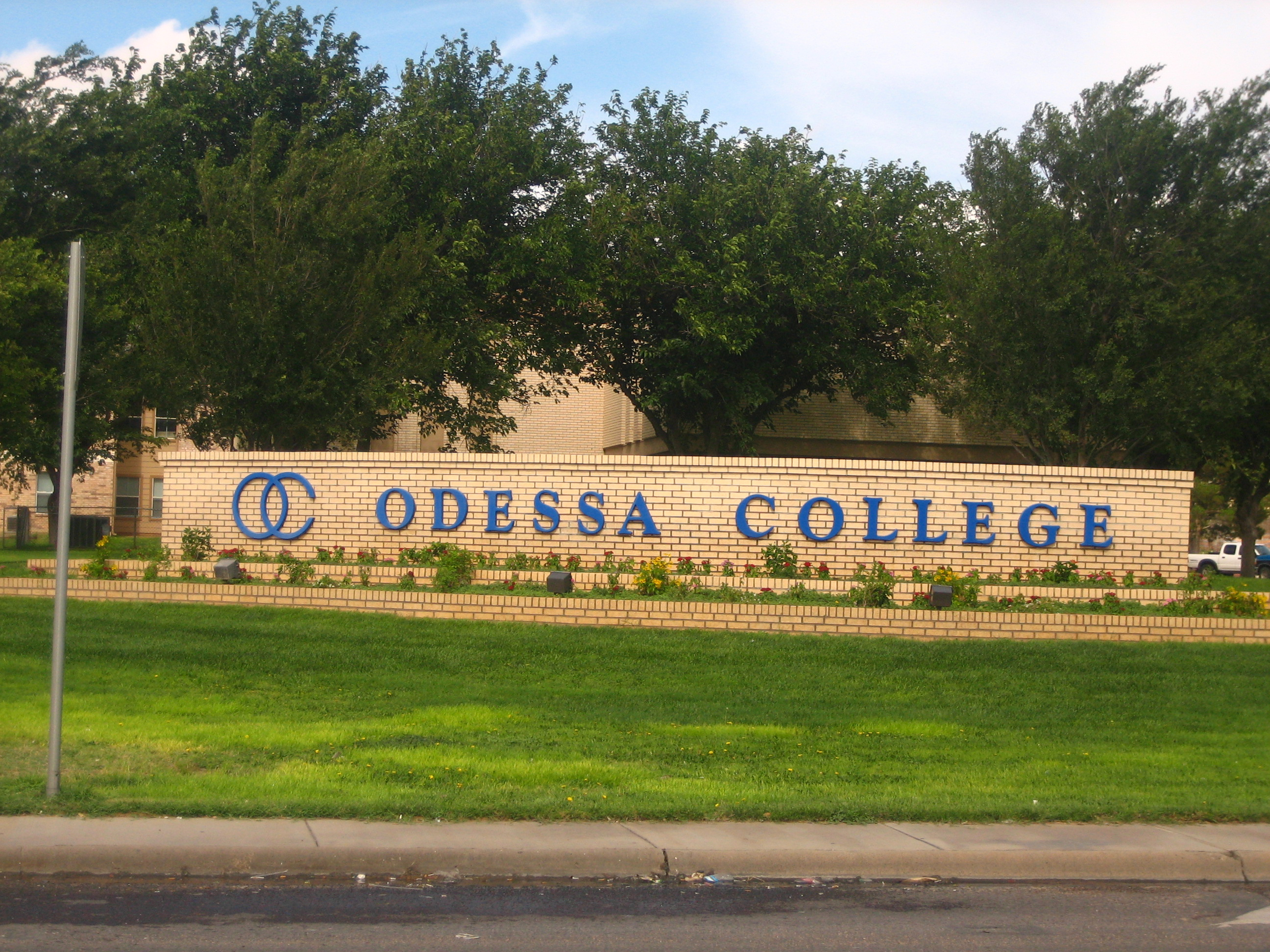
Entrance sign at Odessa College

Odessa College is a public, two-year college based in Odessa, serving the people of Ector County and the Permian Basin. It opened in 1952 and currently enrolls about 6,000 annually in its university-parallel and occupational/technical courses, and 11,000 students annually in its basic education, continuing education, and community recreation courses. Odessa College serves most of Midland, as in the parts in Ector County. Parts in Midland County are assigned to Midland College.

=== Primary and secondary schools ===
The Ector County Independent School District serves portions of Odessa in Ector County (the vast majority of the city). ECISD was established in 1921, in a consolidation of seven area schools. The district now contains 38 campuses. It administers these high schools: Permian High School, Odessa High School, George H.W. Bush New Tech Odessa, OC Techs at Odessa College and Odessa Collegiate Academy, also at Odessa College.

The portion of Odessa in Midland County is zoned to the Midland Independent School District.

Odessa's private schools include Montessori Mastery School of Odessa, Latter Rain Christian School, Odessa Christian School, Permian Basin Christian School, Faith Community Christian Academy, St. John's Episcopal School, St. Mary's Central Catholic School (of the Roman Catholic Diocese of San Angelo), Rainey School of Montessori, Sherwood Christian Academy, and Zion Christian Academy. Odessa is also home to five charter schools: Compass Academy Charter School, UTPB STEM Academy, Harmony Science Academy-Odessa, Embassy Academy, and Richard Milburn Academy-Odessa.

== Media ==
The city's main daily broadsheet newspaper is the Odessa American. A total of 124 listed radio stations broadcast in West Texas, which includes Midland/Odessa, Abilene, San Angelo and Alpine. Most notable broadcasts in Odessa are KFZX Classic Rock (102.1 FM), KMRK My Country (96.1 FM) and KXWT Marfa Public Radio (91.3 FM).

== Transportation ==
=== Air ===
Odessa is primarily served by Midland International Air and Space Port (IATA: MAF, ICAO: KMAF) which served 47,088 passengers in February 2023. It is located in Midland County, within the city limits of the City of Midland but halfway between Downtown Midland and Downtown Odessa. An alternative airport is Odessa-Schlemeyer Field (IATA: ODO, ICAO: KODO), which is located within the city limits of Odessa, being only 5 miles northeast and 10 miles west from MAF. The Federal Aviation Administration categories the field as a general aviation airport.

Midland International Air and Space Port is being served by Southwest Airlines (25,131 passengers as of March 12, 2024), United Airlines (14,780), American Airlines (13,886); inclusive of their subsidiaries, such as American Eagle. Midland Spaceport is currently not being served by any commercial space companies, although the Texas Chapter of the Space Force Association is believed to start operations in the future.

=== Intercity bus ===
Odessa is served by All Aboard America!'s twice daily route between Midland International Air and Space Port and Presidio, with intermediate stops at Crane, McCamey, Ft. Stockton, Alpine, and Marfa.

=== Roads ===
- I-20 (Interstate 20)
- I-20 BL (2nd Street)
- US 385 (Andrews Highway / Grant Avenue)
- SH 191 (42nd Street)
- Spur 450 (Kermit Highway)
- Spur 588 (Faudree Road)
- Loop 338
- FM 1882 (County Road West)
- FM 2020 (University Boulevard)

== Notable people ==
- George H. W. Bush, 41st President of the United States
- George W. Bush, 43rd President of the United States
- Tommy Allsup, musician
- Karan Ashley, actress
- Raymond Benson, author
- Bonner Bolton, bull rider, model
- Jim J. Bullock, actor
- Lucius Desha Bunton III, United States federal judge
- Marcus Cannon, professional football player
- Chuck Dicus, player in College Football Hall of Fame
- Hayden Fry, college football coach
- Dave Gibson, country music singer-songwriter, frontman of award-winning group Gibson/Miller Band.
- Ronald D. Godard, ambassador
- Britt Harley Hager, professional football player
- Daniel Ray Herrera, professional baseball pitcher
- Mike Holloway, winner of Survivor: Worlds Apart
- Daryl Hunt, professional football player
- Virgil Johnson, founder of The Velvets singing group
- Chris Kyle, former U.S. Navy SEAL
- Brooks Landgraf, attorney and member of the Texas House of Representatives from District 81
- Blair Late, singer and actor
- Trey Lunsford, former catcher for the San Francisco Giants
- Bradley Marquez, former NFL wide receiver
- Nolan McCarty, Chair Department of Politics, Princeton University
- Bryan Mealer, journalist and author
- Chris McGaha, NHRA Pro Stock racer
- Gene Mayfield, college and high-school football coach
- Bill Noël, oil industrialist and philanthropist
- Roy Orbison, singer-songwriter
- Barbara Payton, actress
- Robert Rummel-Hudson, author
- Kelly Schmedes, professional soccer player
- Wally Scott, famed glider pilot
- Kim Smith, model and actress
- Toby Stevenson, Olympic pole vaulter
- Connor Storrie, actor
- Treaty Oak Revival, band
- Stephnie Weir, actress and comedian
- Elizabeth Wetmore, novelist
- Roy Williams, professional football player
- Alfred Mac Wilson, United States Marine Corps Medal of Honor recipient
- Marvin Rex Young, U.S. Army Medal of Honor recipient

== In popular culture ==
- The TV show Heroes had characters set in Odessa.
- The book Friday Night Lights: A Town, a Team, and a Dream, by author H. G. Bissinger, and the subsequent movie (Friday Night Lights), are based on the 1988 football season of Permian High School, one of the two high school football teams in Odessa.
- Making News: Texas Style, a reality series on the TV Guide Channel, followed the reporters of the local CBS affiliate, KOSA-TV.
- A portion of the Tommy Lee Jones film The Three Burials of Melquiades Estrada was filmed in Odessa.
- The truTV reality show Black Gold is based on three oil wells outside of Odessa, as well as some locations in Odessa, such as the local Hooters restaurant.
- The final episode of the third season of Twin Peaks included scenes which take place in Odessa.
- Author Raymond Benson set portions of his novels The Black Stiletto and The Black Stiletto: Endings & Beginnings in Odessa. Several of his other novels and short stories use Odessa as a location but it is fictionalized as a town called "Limite, Texas."
- Episodes of the sixth and seventh seasons of Legends of Tomorrow took place in Odessa.
- The novel (and motion picture) "No Country for Old Men" mentions Odessa. Protagonist, Moss, tells his wife, Carla Jean, that she has to go to her mother's house in Odessa and stay there until his call.

== See also ==
- Odessa Flight Strip
- Midland–Odessa shootings
