= Presidential Museum and Leadership Library =

Museum and library complex in Odessa, Texas

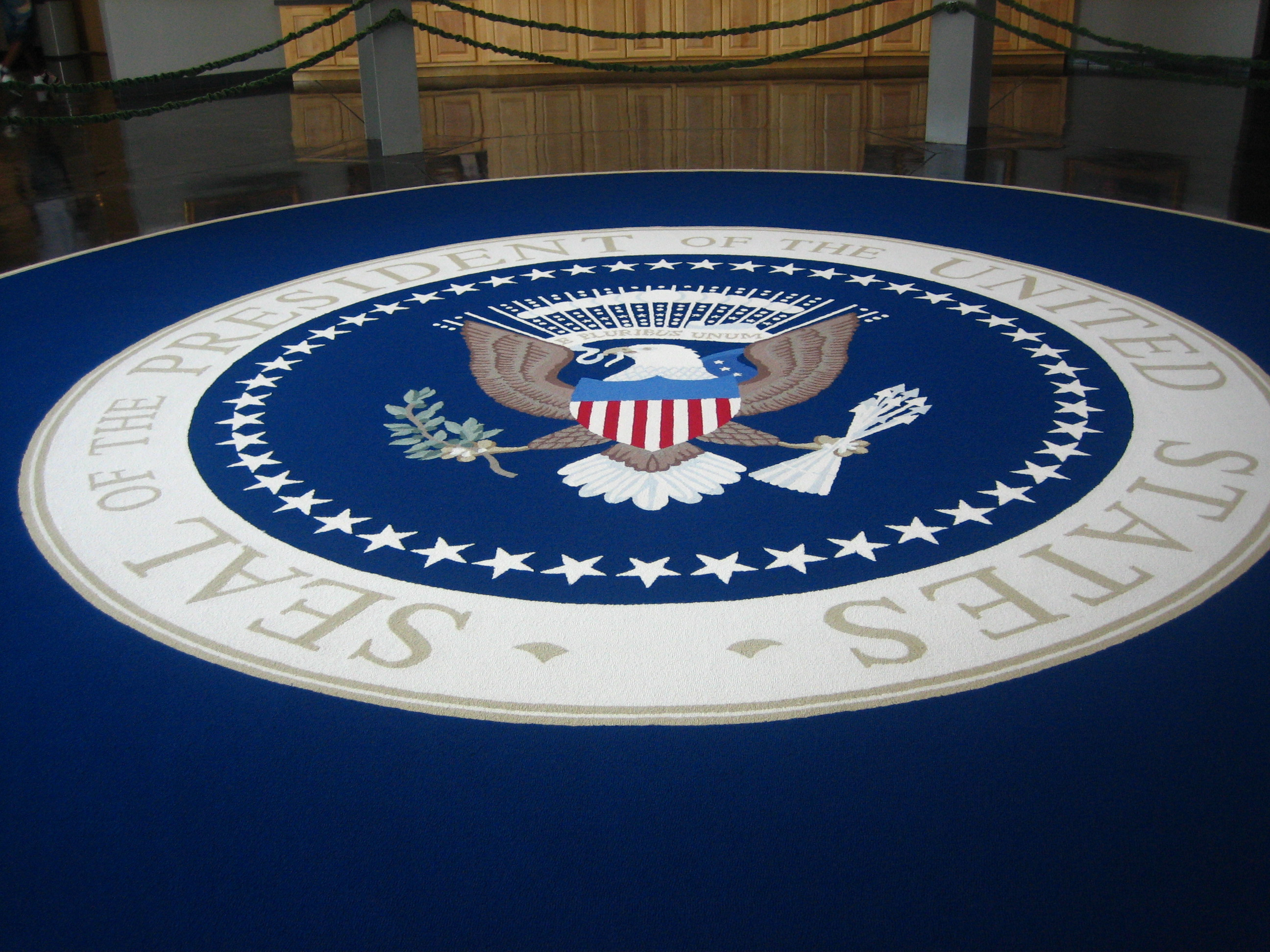
- Replica of President Harry Truman's Oval Office rug
- 31.88287087654273°N 102.31813616226543°W
- Location: Odessa, Texas, United States
- Established: 1965; 61 years ago

Other information
- Website: https://shepperdinstitute.com/presidential-archives/

The Presidential Archives and Leadership Library (formerly, the Presidential Museum) is a museum and library complex located at 4919 East University Blvd. in Odessa, Texas, on the campus of the University of Texas of the Permian Basin.

== History ==
After fighting financial hardships, the Presidential Museum temporarily closed its doors to the public from August 2009 to February 2010. Eventually, the contents of the Presidential Museum, including the library, were transferred to UTPB in 2011, and the facility was reopened to researchers and the public as the Presidential Archives and Leadership Library. The Presidential Museum, now doing business as the "Friends of the Presidential Archives," is nonprofit corporation, formed in the State of Texas in September 1978, and exempt from taxation under section 501 (c) (3).

== Gallery ==
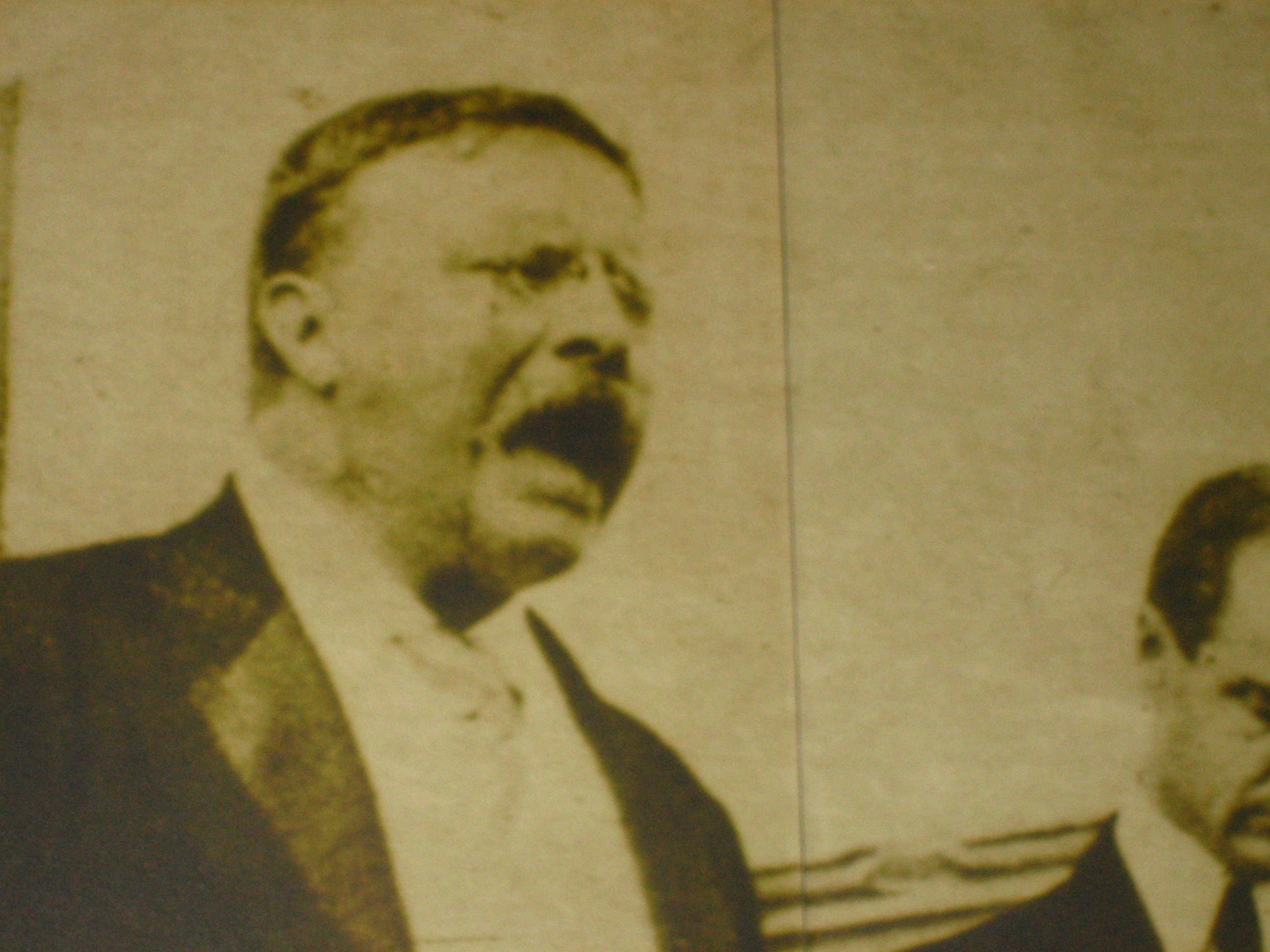
Theodore Roosevelt exhibit

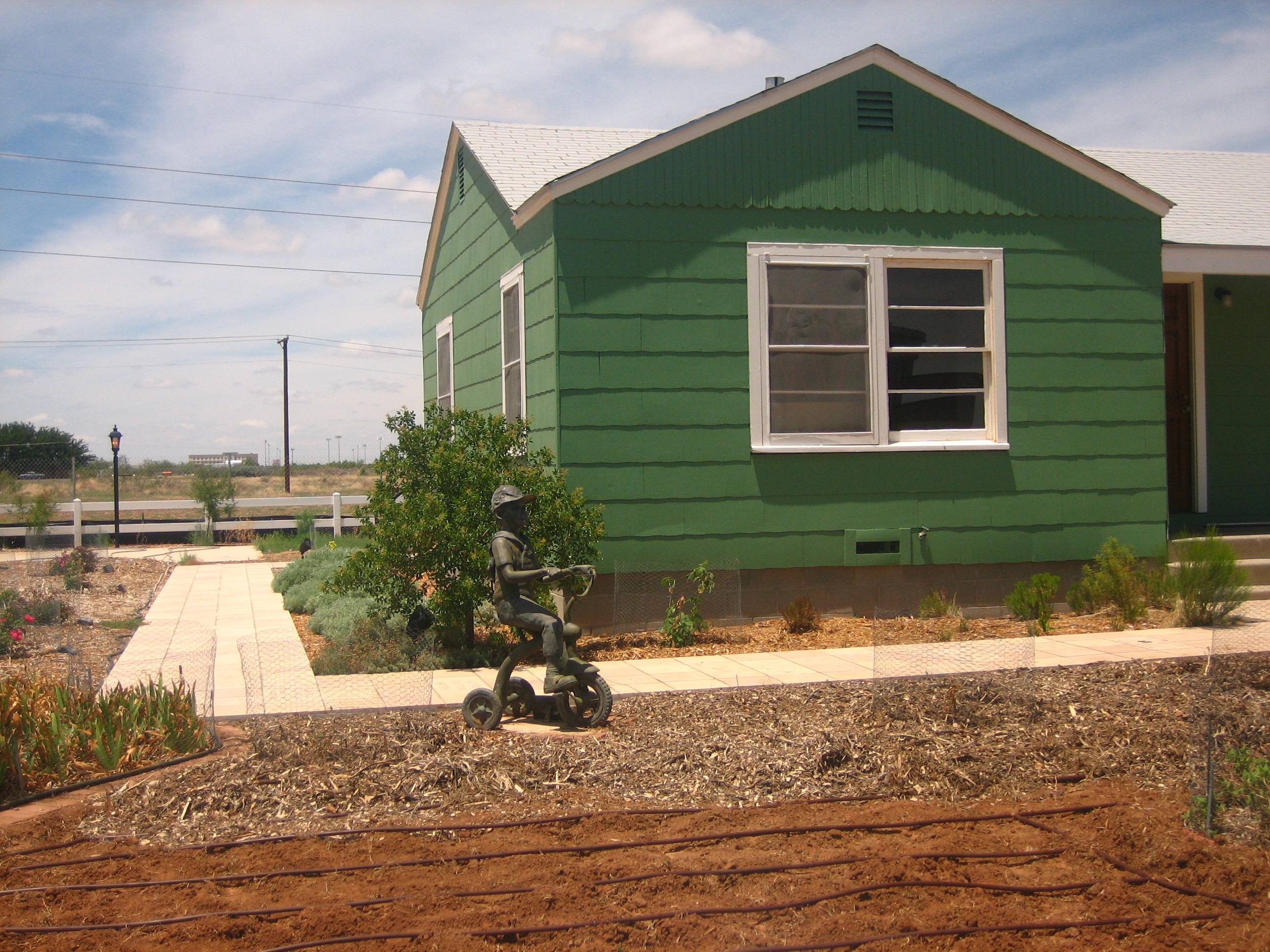
Home of the Bushes from 1948-1949 in Odessa
