= Howard Rosenthal (political scientist) =

American political scientist (1939–2022)

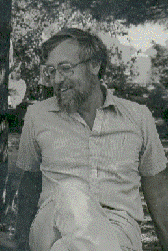
- Born: March 4, 1939; Pittsburgh, Pennsylvania
- Died: June 28, 2022 (aged 83)
- Occupations: Professor, academic

Academic background
- Education: Massachusetts Institute of Technology (BS, PhD)

Academic work
- Discipline: Political Science
- Institutions: Carnegie Mellon University (1966−1993); Princeton University (1993−2005); New York University (2005−2022)
- Main interests: Political economy, American politics, political methodology, comparative politics

Howard Lewis Rosenthal (March 4, 1939 – July 28, 2022) was an American political scientist who was professor of politics at New York University. He also taught at Carnegie-Mellon University and Princeton University, where he was the Roger Williams Straus professor of social sciences.

Rosenthal is known for developing the multidimensional scaling application NOMINATE along with Keith T. Poole, a tool used by political scientists to compare the relative ideologies of current and past members of Congress. He authored numerous books and journal articles, including Partisan Politics, Divided Government, and the Economy with Alberto Alesina and Polarized America: The Dance of Ideology and Unequal Riches with Nolan McCarty and Keith T. Poole.

His main areas of interest included the study of political economy, American politics, political methodology, and comparative politics.

== Early life and education ==
Rosenthal was born on March 4, 1939, in Pittsburgh, Pennsylvania to Arnold Rosenthal and Elinor (Lewis) Rosenthal.

He graduated from MIT with a Bachelor of Science degree in economics, politics, and science in 1960 and later a PhD in political science in 1964.

== Academia ==
Rosenthal taught briefly at the University California, Irvine before becoming a professor at Carnegie Mellon University from 1966 to 1993. He then taught at Princeton University from 1993 to 2005, and at New York University from 2005 to up until his death.

Rosenthal was known for his work in analyzing political polarization and developing new statistical methods to analyze data. Alongside Keith T. Poole, he developed the multidimensional scaling application NOMINATE, a tool used by political scientists to compare the relative ideologies of current and past members of Congress.

Rosenthal also published in scholarly journals such as the American Political Science Review, the American Journal of Political Science, the American Economic Review, and the Journal of Politics.

== Awards ==
Rosenthal received several awards over his career. He earned the Duncan Black Award from the Public Choice Society in 1980 and the C.Q. Press Award from the American Political Science Association in 1985. He also earned the William H. Riker Prize for Political Science from the University of Rochester in 2010.

Rosenthal was a Fellow with the American Academy of Arts and Sciences, the John Simon Guggenheim Memorial Foundation, the Center for Advanced Study in Behavior Sciences, the Russell Sage Foundation, and the Hoover Institution. He also received grants from the National Science Foundation, the Spencer Foundation, and the National Institute of Education.

== Personal life ==
He was married to Margherita Rosenthal, who died before him. He had three children and four granddaughters at the time of his death.

== Selected publications ==
- Hildebrand, David K.; James D. Laing and Howard Rosenthal. Prediction Analysis of Cross Classifications. Wiley Series in Probability and Mathematical Statistics. New York: Wiley, 1977.
- Meltzer, Allan, Romer, Thomas; and Rosenthal, Howard, eds. Carnegie Papers on Political Economy, Vol. 4, Public Choice, 44, 1, 1984.
- Alesina, Alberto, and Howard Rosenthal. Partisan Politics, Divided Government, and the Economy. New York: Cambridge University Press, 1995.
- Poole, Keith T., and Howard Rosenthal. Congress: A Political-Economic History of Roll Call Voting. New York: Oxford University Press, 1997.
- Bolton, Patrick and Howard Rosenthal, eds., Credit Markets for the Poor, New York: Russell Sage Foundation, 2005.
- McCarty, Nolan, Keith T. Poole and Howard Rosenthal. Polarized America: The Dance of Ideology and Unequal Riches, 2006. Cambridge, MA., MIT Press (Walras-Pareto lecture volume).
- Poole, Keith T., and Howard Rosenthal. Ideology in Congress. New Brunswick, Transaction Press, 2007, 2nd Rev. Edition.
- Rosenthal, Howard and David Rothman, eds. What Do We Owe Each Other?, New Brunswick, Transaction Press, 2008.
