= Odessa College =

Public junior college in Odessa, Texas

Coordinates: 31°51′58.0″N 102°23′0.0″W

- Type: Public junior college
- Established: August 29, 1946
- Affiliations: Western Junior College Athletic Conference
- President: Gregory D. Williams
- Students: 7,995 (all undergraduate) Fall 2023
- Location: Odessa, Texas, United States
- Campus: 80 acres (0.32 km^{2})
- Colors: Blue and White
- Nickname: Wranglers
- Mascot: "Willie" the Wrangler
- Website: odessa.edu

Odessa College is a public junior college in Odessa, Texas. The college serves the people of Ector County and the Permian Basin. It was established in 1946 and enrolled 8,024 students in fall 2021 and 7,679 students in spring 2022 in its university-parallel and occupational/technical courses, and 11,000 students annually in its Basic Education, Continuing Education, and Community Recreation courses.

== History ==
Odessa College was founded in 1946 as Odessa Junior College. The college dropped "Junior" from its name around 1976.

As defined by the Texas Legislature, the official service area of Odessa College includes all of Andrews, Brewster, Crane, Culberson, Jeff Davis, Loving, Presidio, Reeves, Upton, Ward, and Winkler Counties, and the Seminole Independent School District, located in Gaines County.

The Pecos Technical Training Center is an extension of Odessa College, located at 1000 S. Eddy St, Pecos, Texas. It first opened in the summer of 1999.

Odessa Junior College was featured in the Supreme Court case Perry v. Sindermann, 408 U.S. 593 (1972).

In 1999, an Odessa doctor and his wife donated a 27,000-square-foot (2,500 m^{2}) building in Pecos to house the new Pecos Technical Training Center of Odessa College. After renovations to the building made possible by an $860,000 Economic Development Administration grant, the center now houses administrative and faculty offices, technical and vocational learning laboratories, and a student lounge. The new center enables Odessa College to improve and expand its long-established extension education program in Pecos.

In 2011, Odessa College, along with Frank Phillips College in Borger, Ranger College in Ranger, and Brazosport College in Lake Jackson, were proposed for closure by the State of Texas. The Texas Association of Community Colleges rallied successfully to keep the four institutions open.

== Athletics ==
Odessa College participates in the Western Junior College Athletic Conference of the National Junior College Athletic Association (NJCAA) in multiple sports. To date, the Odessa sports programs have won 46 NJCAA titles, the most in the association. Eleven sports are currently active: men's and women's basketball, baseball, softball, golf, rodeo, men's and women's cross country, dance, cheerleaders, and trainers.

In 1970, the women's tennis team won the third national collegiate championship of the United States Lawn Tennis Association. In the first annual National Junior College Golf Tournament on June 2–5, 1959, Odessa College almost made a complete sweep of the honors with Jerry Lackey winning the individual championship with a score of 290, while Les Howard and Melvin Chisum took home the first-place trophy in the team competition. In 1968, Gail Sykes won the national intercollegiate individual women's golf championship. During the basketball season, Odessa College broadcasts the men's and women's Western Junior College Athletic Conference road games and the home games with Midland College on the radio.

L. J. Figueroa played for the basketball team during his freshman season. Figueroa averaged 21.4 points, 5.5 rebounds, and 3.7 assists per game, while shooting 48.2 percent from three-point range, and earned 2018 First Team National Junior College Athletic Association Division I All-American honors. He was also named Western Junior College Athletic Conference (WJCAC) Player of the Year and Freshman of the Year.

== Notable alumni ==
- Abraham Ancer, professional golfer
- Bonner Bolton, professional bull rider
- Keandre Cook (born 1997), professional basketball player
- Craig Ehlo, professional basketball player
- L. J. Figueroa (born 1998), professional basketball player
- Josh Gray, professional basketball player
- Larry Johnson (born 1969), professional basketball player
- Rich Loiselle, professional baseball player
- Joe Melson, singer and songwriter
- Ty Murray, professional bull rider
- Moochie Norris, professional basketball player
- Roy Orbison, songwriter and musician
- Jim "Razor" Sharp, professional bull rider
- Tre Simmons, professional basketball player and coach
- Stephnie Weir, actress and comedian
- Kathy Whitworth, professional golfer

== See also ==
- Bill Noël, local industrialist who supported the college
