= University of Texas Permian Basin =

Public university in Odessa, Texas, US

The University of Texas Permian Basin
- Former name: University of Texas of the Permian Basin (1973 to 2021)
- Motto: Disciplina Praesidium Civitatis (Latin)
- Motto in English: "The cultivated mind is the guardian genius of democracy"
- Type: Public university
- Established: February 4, 1969; 57 years ago
- Parent institution: University of Texas System
- Accreditation: SACS
- Academic affiliations: Space-grant
- Endowment: $68.8 million (FY2024) (UTPB only) $47.47 billion (FY2024) (system-wide)
- Budget: $121.6 million (FY2025)
- President: Sandra Woodley
- Academic staff: 306 (fall 2023)
- Administrative staff: 61 (fall 2024)
- Total staff: 653 (fall 2024)
- Students: 4,963 (fall 2024)
- Undergraduates: 3,974 (fall 2024)
- Postgraduates: 989 (fall 2024)
- Location: Odessa, Texas, United States; 31°53′24″N 102°19′43″W
- Campus: 644 acres (2.61 km^{2}); Midsize City
- Other campuses: Midland
- Colors: Falcon orange, white, black, and blue
- Nickname: Falcons
- Sporting affiliations: NCAA Division II – Lone Star
- Website: www.utpb.edu

The University of Texas Permian Basin (UTPB) is a public university in Odessa, Texas, United States. It is part of the University of Texas System. UTPB was authorized by the Texas Legislature in 1969 and founded in 1973. UTPB is home to 5,585 students (4,218 undergraduate), and 300 teaching faculty as of fall 2025.

== History ==
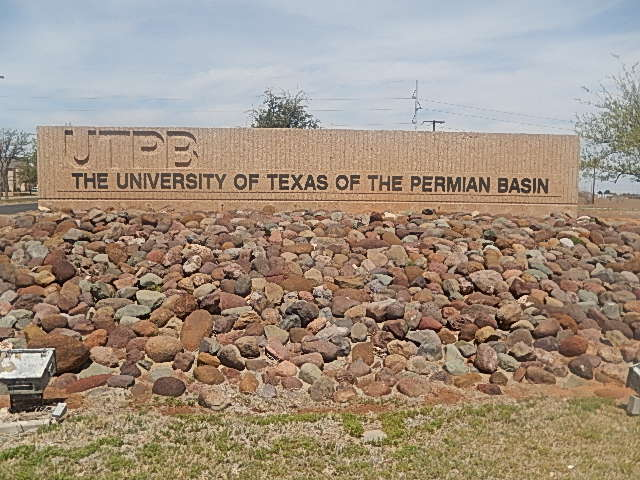
University of Texas of the Permian Basin entrance sign

The University of Texas of the Permian Basin began in 1973 as a university that initially offered only junior, senior, and graduate level programs. Among those who pushed for the establishment of UTPB was the oil industrialist Bill Noël, who with his wife, Ellen Witwer Noël, became major philanthropists of the institution.

In 1991 the university began accepting freshmen and sophomore applicants, and in 2000, the J. Conrad Dunagen Library and Lecture Center was completed, featuring a twenty-station multimedia lab and classroom.

During 2006, the university was holding discussions with the Nuclear Regulatory Commission about the construction of a new High-Temperature Teaching and Test Reactor which, if successful, would finish licensing and construction around 2012. It would also be the first university-based research reactor to be built in the US in roughly a decade, and one of the few HTGR type reactors in the world. In late November in 2016 the city of Odessa granted site permission. That was the first step in official authorization.

On April 17, 2008, the university broke ground on a new Science and Technology Complex. The new building houses chemistry, biology, physics, computer science, and information technology programs. The new 70,000-square-foot (6,500 m^{2}) building contains 41 labs, 56 offices, six classrooms, and three sunken lecture halls. Despite warnings from a UTPB Geology professor, the contractor failed to identify an underground aquifer that could cause the building supports to sink. Construction was delayed while the contractor reinforced the building supports after drilling into the aquifer; however, the building opened in time for the Fall 2011 semester. The building houses classrooms, multiple laboratories including two large demonstration labs, a 200-seat lecture hall, and a state-of-the-art Data Communications Teaching Lab for undergraduate and graduate students. The Computer Science Department maintains a computer science research lab and a computer networking research lab.

A state-of-the-art building known as the Wagner Noël Performing Arts Center is now open in the Midland campus, off Hwy 191 and FM 1788. Construction began in 2009 and the center opened with a grand gala featuring Rod Stewart on November 1, 2011.

In 2018, UTPB announced a new kinesiology building at a cost of around 37 million dollars. The following year, UTPB announced the opening of its 55 million dollar engineering building.

== Campus ==
=== Main campus ===
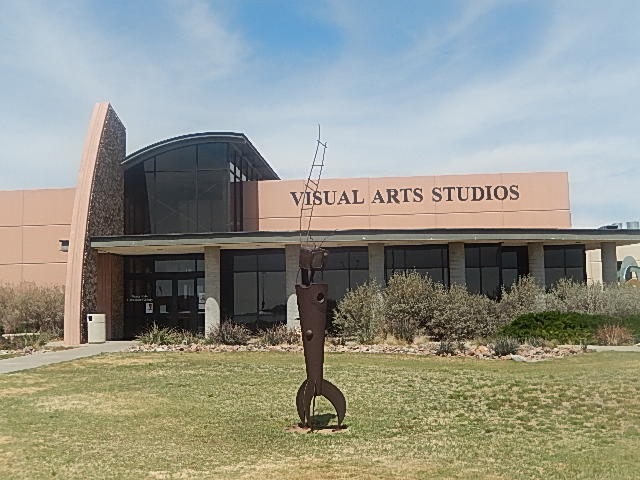
Visual Arts Studios

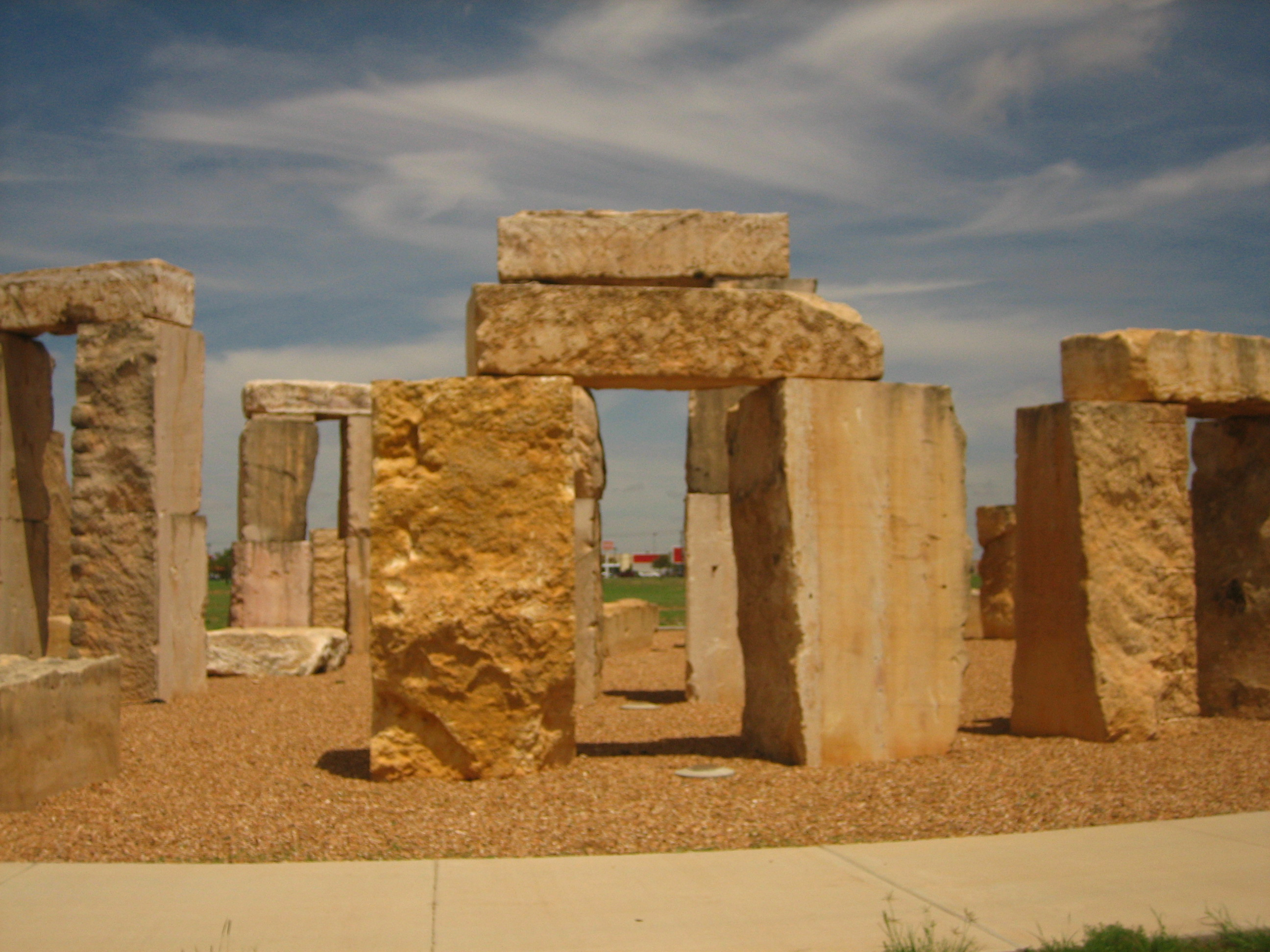
Stonehenge replica on the campus of the University of Texas of the Permian Basin in Odessa

A Stonehenge replica was added adjacent to the Visual Arts Studio.

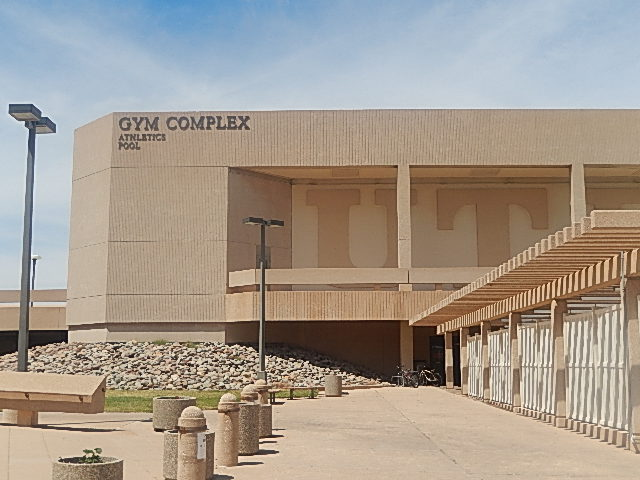
Gym Complex

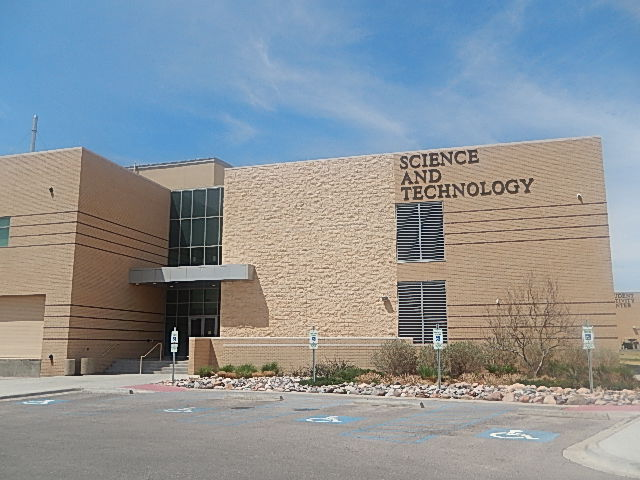
Science and Technology Building

- Parker Ranch House
- Mesa Building
- J. Conrad Dunagan Library/Lecture Center
- Founder's Building
- Visual Arts Studio
- Gymnasium Complex
- Gym Annex Building
- Falcon's Nest(Housing)
- Falcon's Court(Housing)
- Industrial Technology Building
- Science and Technology Building
- Student Activity Center
- Thermal Energy Plant
- Physical Plant
- PETS

Other places of interest

- Ellen Noël Art Museum
- Presidential Archives and Leadership Library
- Fire Station (City of Odessa)
- U.T.P.B. Park (City of Odessa)
- U.T.P.B. Bright Star Memorial

=== Midland campus ===
- Center for Energy and Economic Diversification (CEED)
- Wagner Noël Performing Arts Center
  - Performance Hall
  - Rea-Greathouse Recital Hall

Future developments

- Engineering Building
- Student Housing
- Academic Additions

== Academics ==
Undergraduate demographics as of Fall 2023
Race and ethnicity	Total
Hispanic	54%
White	26%
Black	8%
International student	7%
Asian	2%
Two or more races	2%
Unknown	1%
Economic diversity
Low-income (Note: The percentage of students who received an income-based federal Pell grant intended for low-income students.)	38%
Affluent (Note: The percentage of students who are a part of the American middle class at the bare minimum.)	62%

The university offers bachelor's degrees and master's degrees, through its five colleges and schools:

- College of Arts and Humanities
- College of Business
- College of Engineering and Sciences
- College of Education
- College of Health Sciences

== Athletics ==
The UT Permian Basin (UTPB) athletic teams are called the Falcons. The university is a member at the Division II level of the National Collegiate Athletic Association (NCAA), primarily competing as a member of the Lone Star Conference (LSC) since the 2016–17 academic year. The Falcons previously competed in the D-II Heartland Conference from 2006–07 to 2015–16; in the Red River Athletic Conference (RRAC) of the National Association of Intercollegiate Athletics (NAIA) from 1998–99 to 2005–06; and as an NAIA Independent from 1995–96 to 1997–98. The teams' uniforms reflect the school colors of orange, white, and black.

UTPB competes in 16 intercollegiate varsity sports: Men's sports include baseball, basketball, cross country, football, golf, soccer, swimming & diving, and tennis; while women's sports include basketball, cross country, golf, soccer, softball, swimming & diving, tennis, and volleyball.

== Notable alumni ==
- Daeshon Francis (born 1996), basketball player in the Israeli Basketball Premier League
