= Society for Political Methodology =

American learned society

- Abbreviation: SPM
- Formation: 1983; 43 years ago
- Type: Learned society
- Field: Political methodology
- President: Suzanna Linn
- Publication: Political Analysis; The Political Methodologist
- Affiliations: American Political Science Association
- Website: polmeth.org

The Society for Political Methodology (SPM) is a learned society focused on quantitative methods in political science, and an organized section of the American Political Science Association. Founded in 1983, it publishes the peer-reviewed journal Political Analysis via Cambridge University Press. The society annually awards the John T. Williams Dissertation Prize for the best dissertation proposal in the area of political methodology.

== Presidents ==
- 1983–1985: Christopher H. Achen
- 1985–1987: John E. Jackson
- 1987–1989: Stanley Feldman
- 1989–1991: John R. Freeman
- 1991–1993: Henry E. Brady
- 1993–1995: Larry Bartels
- 1995–1997: James Stimson
- 1997–1999: Gary King
- 1999–2001: Charles Franklin
- 2001–2003: Jonathan Nagler
- 2003–2005: Simon Jackman
- 2005–2007: Janet M. Box-Steffensmeier
- 2007–2009: Philip A. Schrodt
- 2009–2011: Jeff Gill
- 2011–2013: Robert Franzese
- 2013–2015: Kevin Quinn
- 2015–2017: Jeffrey Lewis
- 2017–2019: Kosuke Imai
- 2019–present: Suzanna Linn
