= Democratic consolidation =

Process through which democracy is established

Democratic consolidation is the process by which a new democracy matures, in a way that it becomes unlikely to revert to authoritarianism without an external shock, and is regarded as the only available system of government within a country. A country can be described as consolidated when the current democratic system becomes "the only game in town", meaning no one in the country is trying to act outside of the set institutions. This is the case when no significant political group seriously attempts to overthrow the democratic regime, the democratic system is regarded as the most appropriate way to govern by the vast majority of the public, and all political actors are accustomed to the fact that conflicts are resolved through established political and constitutional rules.

Since 1992 the number of democratic countries has been greater than the number of dictatorships. As of 2018, this number continued to grow as countries went through the process of consolidation. The notion of democratic consolidation is contested because it is not clear that there is anything substantive that happens to new democracies that secures their continuation, beyond those factors that make it "more likely" that they continue as democracies. Many scholars have attempted to explain the factors that are responsible for democracies consolidating, which has led to the emergence of different "consolidation theories" in political science. Unconsolidated democracies often suffer from formalized but intermittent elections and clientelism.

== Indicators of consolidation ==
A democracy is widely considered consolidated when several or all of the following conditions are met. Firstly, there must be a durability or permanence of democracy over time, including (but by no means limited to) adherence to democratic principles such as rule of law, independent judiciary, competitive and fair elections, and a developed civil society. Some theorists believe that this secondary process of instilling democracy into the institutions of government is how consolidation occurs. The democracy must also be accepted by its citizens as the ruling form of government, thus ensuring stability and, again, minimizing the risk of reverting to an enforcement or advocacy of strict obedience to authority at the expense of personal freedom regime. Another indicator is two consecutive turnovers of power. The presence of political parties is also an indicator of the promotion of democratic consolidation. Scholars have argued that political parties are the number one way to mobilize voter support and bolster political participation in the competition for office. In order for political parties to be reaching their full potential in benefiting their country through political consolidation, the parties must develop their structures and frameworks to promote political publicity. Additionally, Terry Clark argues that to fully benefit democratic consolidation, a party system must consist of more than one party, yet not be too fragmented or polarized.

Socioeconomic factors can also be a key indicator in democratic consolidation. Strong economic development has historically been found to increase democratic ideals throughout a country.

== Consolidation theories ==
=== Institutionalization ===
Some scholars think that the process by which a democracy becomes consolidated involves the creation and improvement of secondary institutions of the democracy. Linz and Stepan's thesis, for example, is that democracy is consolidated by the presence of the institutions supporting and surrounding elections. They distinct five conditions that must be present in a state, in order for a democracy to be consolidated; First, there needs to be a civil society, which Linz and Stepan describe as an "arena of the polity where self-organizing and relatively autonomous groups, movements, and individuals attempt to articulate values, to create associations and solidarities, and to advance their interests". Secondly, there must be a relatively autonomous "political society", which is the arena in which political actors can compete with one another for the legitimate right to rule. The third condition is that all actors throughout the state's territory are subject to the rule of law. Fourthly, there must be an existing system of state bureaucracy that is ready for the democratic government to use. Lastly, there must be an institutionalized economic society, by which Linz and Stepan mean that consolidated democracies cannot co-exist alongside a command economy, nor alongside a pure free-market economy. So in order for democracies to be able to consolidate, there needs to be a set of economic norms, institutions, and regulations that mediates between the state and the market, according to Linz and Stepan.

=== Informal rules ===
O'Donnell believes that the institutionalization of electoral rules is not the most interesting feature of democratic consolidation. He thinks that scholars focus too much on the formal institutions as drivers of consolidation, while the informal institutions and rules in a state are often overlooked. The informal rules and norms often shape the behaviour and expectations of all sorts of political actors. O'Donnell's approach is to compare the formal institutional rules (for example the constitution) with the informal practices of actors, arguing that in many countries the two are significantly different. Consolidation according to this view is when the actors in a system follow (have informally institutionalised) the formal rules of the democratic institution.

=== Political culture ===
Political culture is linked to democratic consolidation. Scholars Gabriel Almond and Sidney Verba, in The Civic Culture (1963), argued that public participation in government and attitudes toward government were significant in democratic transition and consolidation. Some scholars identify political tolerance and trust in institutions as important to democratic consolidation.

=== Labour migration ===
One of the suggested obstacles to democratic consolidation is brain drain in which high skilled workers from developing countries migrate to high-income and capital-rich countries. This leaves many new democracies in the developing world with problems for effective governance due to the lack of highly skilled professionals.

== Examples ==
=== Mexico ===
Whether Mexico is a fully consolidated democracy as of the 2000s is the source of much debate, but the process had clearly begun by 2009. After over 70 years of authoritarian rule under the Mexican PRI party, Mexican politics transitioned into a competitive, multi-party system. Mexican courts are independent and may check the powers of other branches of government, and media censorship is slowly loosening its grip. Political results, such as those of the 2018 presidential election, suggested that the PRI was unlikely to regain sole power over the country.

=== Western Europe ===
In general, the countries of western Europe serve as examples of fully consolidated democracies. The United Kingdom and the Netherlands, for example, are both very unlikely to revert to authoritarian monarchies, because they have adopted several characteristics that are often associated with fully consolidated democracies: there is adherence to the rule of law, they frequently organize fair and competitive elections and they have a developed civil society.

== See also ==
- Democratization
- Democratic backsliding
- Authoritarianism
