= Civic political culture =

Type of political culture

A civic culture or civic political culture is a political culture characterized by "acceptance of the authority of the state" and "a belief in participation in civic duties". The term was first used in Gabriel Almond and Sidney Verba's book, The Civic Culture. Civic political culture is a mixture of other political cultures namely parochial, subject and participant political cultures. Almond and Verba characterised Britain as having a civic political culture. In "Is Britain Still a Civic Culture?" Patrick Seyd and Paul Whiteley discuss the extent to which Britain can still be regarded as having a civic political culture. The term civic culture is used to identify the political culture characteristics that explain the stability of a democratic society's political structure.

Almond and Verba state that the following are characteristics of a civic culture:

- Orientation toward political system in both the political and governmental senses
- Pride in aspects of one's nation
- Expectation of fair treatment from government authorities
- Ability to talk freely and frequently about politics
- An emotional involvement in elections
- Tolerance towards opposition parties
- A Valuing of active participation in local government activities, parties, and in civic associations
- Self-confidence in one's competence to participate in politics
- Civic cooperation and trust
- Membership in the political associations.

The proper combination of the various types of political culture will provide a culture that has a positive implication for the growth of democracy.
