= Politics of Germany =

Political System of the Federal Republic of Germany Politisches System der Bundesrepublik Deutschland (German)
- Polity type: Federal democratic parliamentary republic
- Constitution: Basic Law for Germany

Legislative branch
- Name: Bundestag and Bundesrat
- Type: Bicameral
- Meeting place: Reichstag building
- Presiding officer: Julia Klöckner, President of the Bundestag

Executive branch
- Head of state
- Title: Federal President
- Currently: Frank-Walter Steinmeier
- Appointer: Bundesversammlung
- Head of government
- Title: Federal Chancellor
- Currently: Friedrich Merz
- Appointer: President
- Cabinet
- Name: Cabinet of Germany
- Current cabinet: Merz cabinet
- Leader: Chancellor
- Deputy leader: Vice Chancellor
- Appointer: President
- Headquarters: Chancellery
- Ministries: 15

Judicial branch
- Name: Judiciary of Germany
- Federal Constitutional Court
- Chief judge: Stephan Harbarth
- Seat: Seat of the Court, Karlsruhe

Germany is a democratic and federal parliamentary republic, where federal legislative power is vested in the Bundestag (the parliament of Germany) and the Bundesrat (the representative body of the Länder, Germany's regional states).

The federal system has, since 1949, been dominated by the Christian Democratic Union (CDU) and the Social Democratic Party of Germany (SPD). The judiciary of Germany is independent of the executive and the legislature, while it is common for leading members of the executive to be members of the legislature as well. The political system is laid out in the 1949 constitution, the Grundgesetz (Basic Law), which remained in effect with minor amendments after German reunification in 1990.

The constitution emphasizes the protection of individual liberty in an extensive catalogue of human and civil rights and divides powers both between the federal and state levels and between the legislative, executive and judicial branches.

West Germany was a founding member of the European Community in 1958, which became the EU in 1993. Germany is part of the Schengen Area, and has been a member of the eurozone since 1999. It is a member of the United Nations, NATO, the G7, the G20 and the OECD.

The Economist Intelligence Unit rated Germany a "full democracy" in 2022. According to the V-Dem Democracy indices, in 2023 Germany was the 15th most electoral democratic country in the world.

== History ==
=== 1945–1998 ===
Beginning with the election of Konrad Adenauer in 1949, the Federal Republic of Germany had Christian Democratic chancellors for 20 years until a coalition between the Social Democrats and the Liberals took over. From 1982, Christian Democratic leader Helmut Kohl was chancellor in a coalition with the Liberals for 16 years. In this period fell the reunification of Germany, in 1990: the German Democratic Republic joined the Federal Republic. In the former GDR's territory, five Länder (states) were established or reestablished. The two parts of Berlin united as one "Land" (state).

The political system of the Federal Republic remained more or less unchanged. Specific provisions for the former GDR territory were enabled via the unification treaty between the Federal Republic and the GDR prior to the unification day of 3 October 1990. However, Germany saw in the following two distinct party systems: the Green party and the Liberals remained mostly West German parties, while in the East the former socialist state party, now called The Left Party, flourished along with the Christian Democrats and Social Democrats.

=== 1998–2005 ===
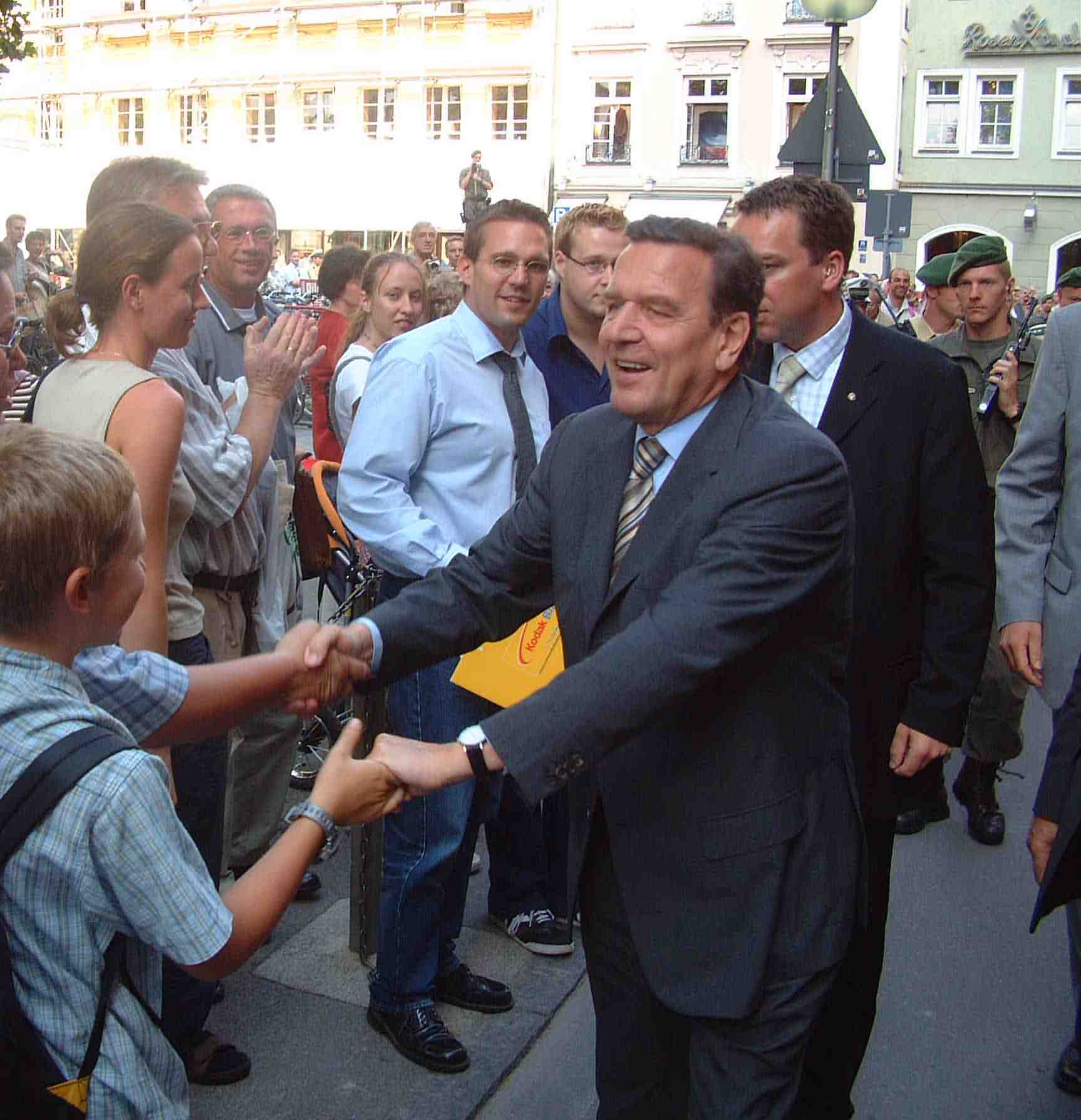
Gerhard Schröder in the 2002 elections

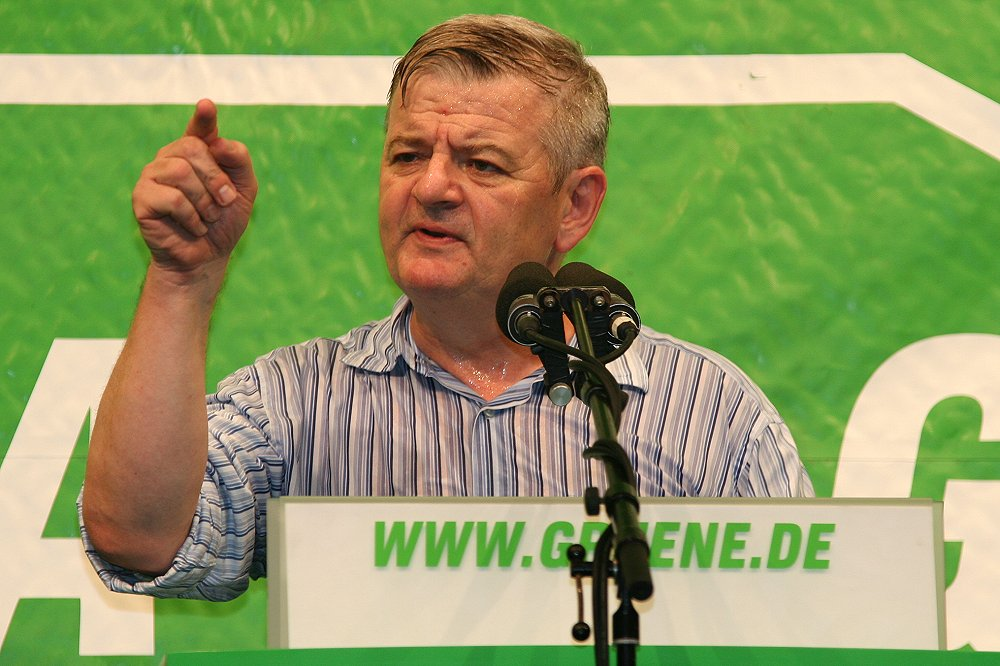
Joschka Fischer in the 2005 elections

After 16 years of the Christian–Liberal coalition, led by Helmut Kohl, the Social Democratic Party of Germany (SPD) together with the Greens won the Bundestag elections of 1998. SPD vice chairman Gerhard Schröder positioned himself as a centrist candidate, in contradiction to the leftist SPD chairman Oskar Lafontaine. The Kohl government was hurt at the polls by slower economic growth in the East in the previous two years, and constantly high unemployment. The final margin of victory was sufficiently high to permit a "red-green" coalition of the SPD with Alliance 90/The Greens (Bündnis '90/Die Grünen), bringing the Greens into a national government for the first time.

Initial problems of the new government, marked by policy disputes between the moderate and traditional left wings of the SPD, resulted in some voter disaffection. Lafontaine left the government (and later his party) in early 1999. The CDU won in some important state elections but was hit in 2000 by a party donation scandal from the Kohl years. As a result of this Christian Democratic Union (CDU) crisis, Angela Merkel became chair.

The next election for the Bundestag was on 22 September 2002. Gerhard Schröder led the coalition of SPD and Greens to an eleven-seat victory over the Christian Democrat challengers headed by Edmund Stoiber (CSU). Three factors are generally cited that enabled Schröder to win the elections despite poor approval ratings a few months before and a weaker economy: good handling of the 100-year flood, firm opposition to the US 2003 invasion of Iraq, and Stoiber's unpopularity in the east, which cost the CDU crucial seats there.

In its second term, the red–green coalition lost several very important state elections, for example in Lower Saxony where Schröder was the prime minister from 1990 to 1998. On 20 April 2003, chancellor Schröder announced massive labor market reforms, called Agenda 2010, that cut unemployment benefits. Although these reforms sparked massive protests, they are now credited with being in part responsible for the relatively strong economic performance of Germany during the euro-crisis and the decrease in unemployment in Germany in the years 2006–2007.

=== 2005–2009 ===
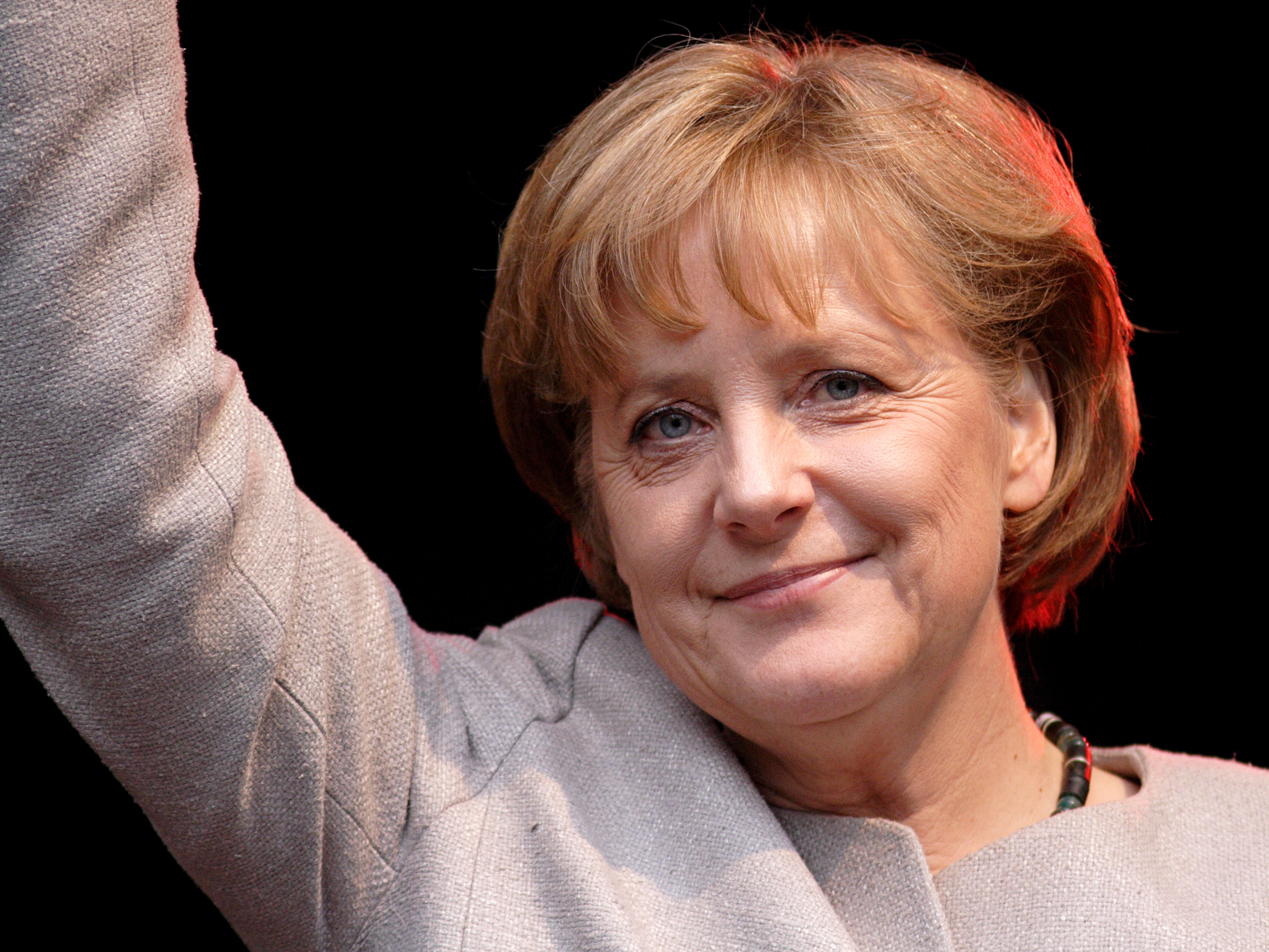
Angela Merkel of the Christian Democrats, chancellor from 2005 to 2021

On 22 May 2005 the SPD received a devastating defeat in its former heartland, North Rhine-Westphalia. Half an hour after the election results, the SPD chairman Franz Müntefering announced that the chancellor would clear the way for new federal elections.

This took the republic by surprise, especially because the SPD was below 20% in polls at the time. The CDU quickly announced Angela Merkel as Christian Democrat candidate for chancellor, aspiring to be the first female chancellor in German history.

New for the 2005 election was the alliance between the newly formed Electoral Alternative for Labor and Social Justice (WASG) and the PDS, planning to fuse into a common party (see Left Party.PDS). With the former SPD chairman, Oskar Lafontaine for the WASG and Gregor Gysi for the PDS as prominent figures, this alliance soon found interest in the media and in the population. Polls in July saw them as high as 12%.

Whereas in May and June 2005 victory of the Christian Democrats seemed highly likely, with some polls giving them an absolute majority, this picture changed shortly before the election on 18 September 2005.

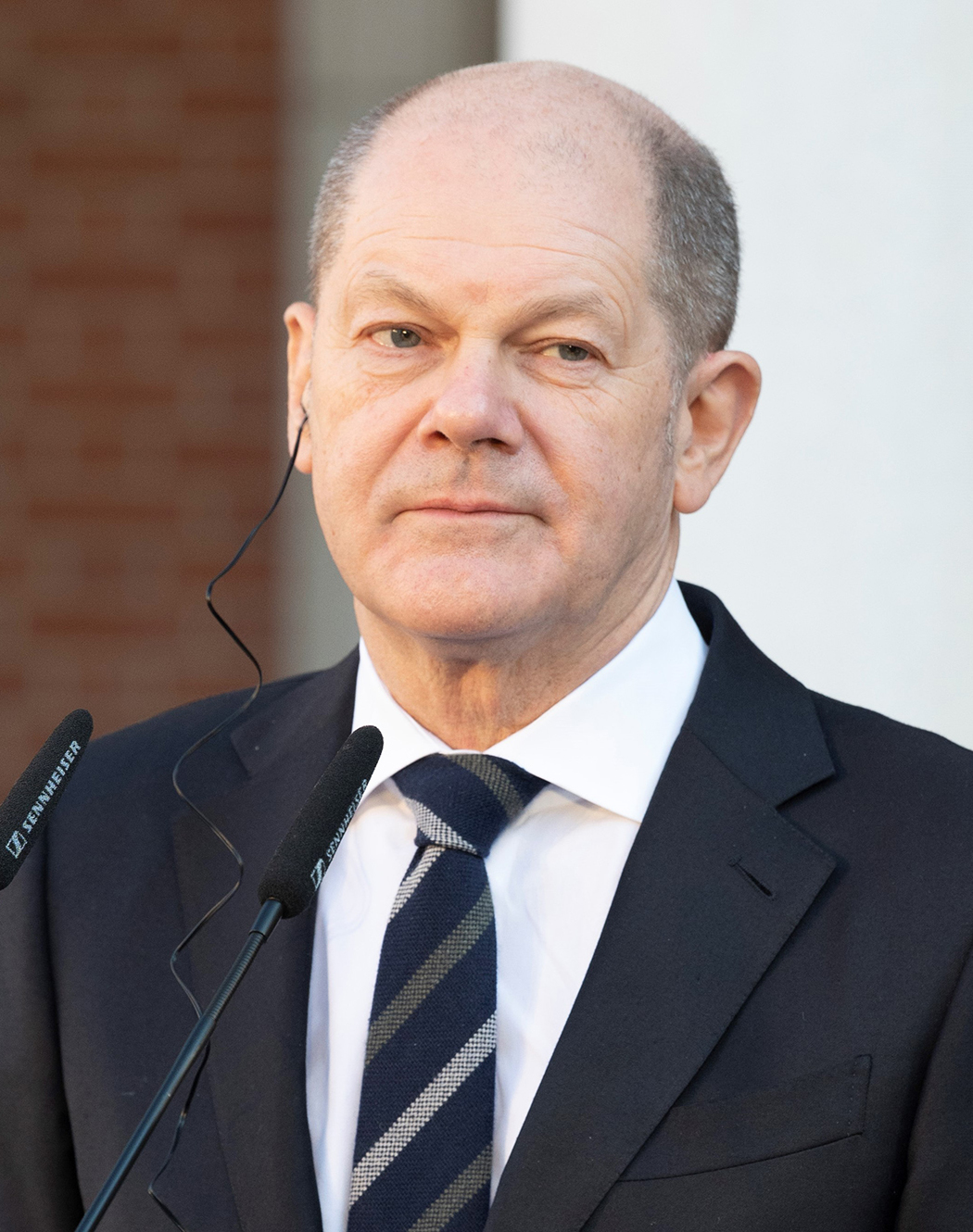
Olaf Scholz, chancellor from 2021 to 2025

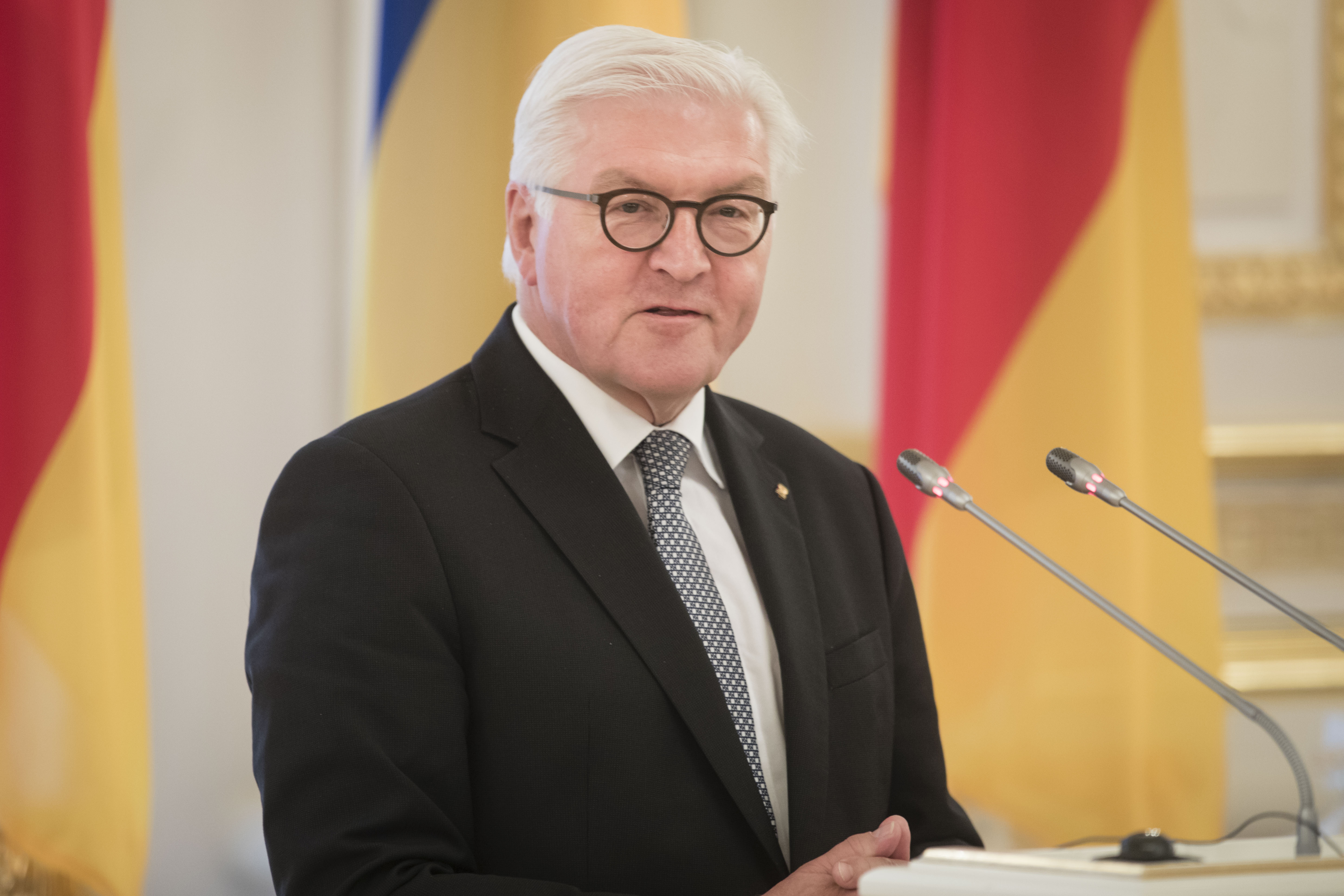
Frank-Walter Steinmeier was the Social Democrat candidate for chancellor in 2009 and president of Germany since 2017.

The election results of 18 September were surprising because they differed widely from the polls of the previous weeks. The Christian Democrats even lost votes compared to 2002, narrowly reaching the first place with only 35.2%, and failed to get a majority for a "black–yellow" government of CDU/CSU and liberal FDP. But the red–green coalition also failed to get a majority, with the SPD losing votes, but polling 34.2% and the greens staying at 8.1%. The Left reached 8.7% and entered the Bundestag, whereas the far-right NPD only got 1.6%.

The most likely outcome of coalition talks was a so-called grand coalition between the Christian Democrats (CDU/CSU) and the Social Democrats (SPD). Three party coalitions and coalitions involving The Left had been ruled out by all interested parties (including The Left itself). On 22 November 2005, Angela Merkel was sworn in by President Horst Köhler for the office of Bundeskanzlerin.

The existence of the grand coalition on federal level helped smaller parties' electoral prospects in state elections. Since in 2008, the CSU lost its absolute majority in Bavaria and formed a coalition with the FDP, the grand coalition had no majority in the Bundesrat and depended on FDP votes on important issues. In November 2008, the SPD re-elected its already retired chair Franz Müntefering and made Frank-Walter Steinmeier its leading candidate for the federal election in September 2009.

As a result of that federal election, the grand coalition brought losses for both parties and came to an end. The SPD suffered the heaviest losses in its history and was unable to form a coalition government. The CDU/CSU had only little losses but also reached a new historic low with its worst result since 1949. The three smaller parties thus had more seats in the German Bundestag than ever before, with the liberal party FDP winning 14.6% of votes.

=== 2009–2013 ===
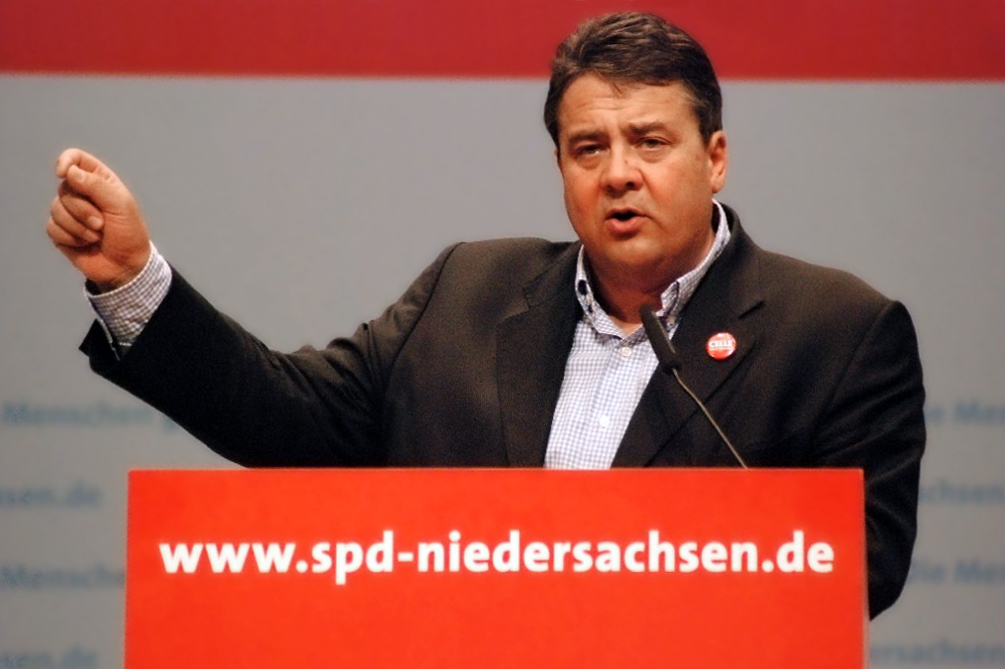
Sigmar Gabriel: SPD chairman from 2009 to 2017, 2013–2017 Deputy to the Chancellor

The CDU/CSU and FDP together held 332 seats (of 622 total seats) and had been in coalition since 27 October 2009. Angela Merkel was re-elected as chancellor, and Guido Westerwelle served as the foreign minister and vice chancellor of Germany. After being elected into the federal government, the FDP suffered heavy losses in the following state elections. The FDP had promised to lower taxes in the electoral campaign, but after being part of the coalition they had to concede that this was not possible due to the economic crisis of 2008. Because of the losses, Guido Westerwelle had to resign as chair of the FDP in favor of Philipp Rösler, federal minister of health, who was consequently appointed as vice chancellor. Shortly after, Philipp Rösler changed office and became federal minister of economics and technology.

After their electoral fall, the Social Democrats were led by Sigmar Gabriel, a former federal minister and prime minister of Lower Saxony, and by Frank-Walter Steinmeier as the head of the parliamentary group. He resigned on 16 January 2017 and proposed his longtime friend and president of European Parliament Martin Schulz as his successor and chancellor candidate. Germany has seen increased political activity by citizens outside the established political parties with respect to local and environmental issues such as the location of Stuttgart 21, a railway hub, and construction of Berlin Brandenburg Airport.

=== 2013–2017 ===
The 18th federal elections in Germany resulted in the re-election of Angela Merkel and her Christian democratic parliamentary group of the parties CDU and CSU, receiving 41.5% of all votes. Following Merkel's first two historically low results, her third campaign marked the CDU/CSU's best result since 1994 and only for the second time in German history the possibility of gaining an absolute majority. Their former coalition partner, the FDP, narrowly failed to reach the 5% threshold and did not gain seats in the Bundestag.

Not having reached an absolute majority, the CDU/CSU formed a grand coalition with the social-democratic SPD after the longest coalition talks in history, making the head of the party Sigmar Gabriel vice-chancellor and federal minister for economic affairs and energy. Together they held 504 of a total 631 seats (CDU/CSU 311 and SPD 193). The only two opposition parties were The Left (64 seats) and Alliance '90/The Greens (63 seats), which was acknowledged as creating a critical situation in which the opposition parties did not even have enough seats to use the special controlling powers of the opposition.

=== 2017–2021 ===
The 19th federal elections in Germany took place on 24 September 2017. The two big parties, the conservative parliamentary group CDU/CSU and the social democrat SPD were in a similar situation as in 2009, after the last grand coalition had ended, and both had suffered severe losses; reaching their second worst and worst result respectively in 2017.

Many votes in the 2017 elections went to smaller parties, leading the right-wing populist party AfD (Alternative for Germany) into the Bundestag which marked a big shift in German politics since it was the first far-right party to win seats in parliament since the 1950s.

With Merkel's candidacy for a fourth term, the CDU/CSU only reached 33.0% of the votes, but won the highest number of seats, leaving no realistic coalition option without the CDU/CSU. As all parties in the Bundestag strictly ruled out a coalition with the AfD, the only options for a majority coalition were a so-called "Jamaican" coalition (CDU/CSU, FDP, Greens; named after the party colors resembling those of the Jamaican flag) and a grand coalition with the SPD, which was at first opposed by the Social Democrats and their leader Martin Schulz.

Coalition talks between the three parties of the "Jamaican" coalition were held but the final proposal was rejected by the liberals of the FDP, leaving the government in limbo. Following the unprecedented situation, for the first time in German history different minority coalitions or even direct snap coalitions were also heavily discussed. At this point, Federal President Steinmeier invited leaders of all parties for talks about a government, being the first president in the history of the Federal Republic to do so.

Official coalition talks between CDU/CSU and SPD started in January 2018 and led to a renewal of the grand coalition on 12 March 2018 as well as the subsequent re-election of Angela Merkel as chancellor.

=== 2021–2025 ===
Scheduled elections for the new Bundestag were held on 26 September 2021 during the COVID-19 pandemic. Angela Merkel did not stand for a fifth term but handed her post over after the second longest term for a chancellor in German history. Olaf Scholz was sworn in as the new chancellor on 8 December 2021. His Social Democrats had won the plurality of votes and formed a liberal-left coalition government with The Greens and the FDP.

For the first time since 1949 the South Schleswig Voters' Association was able to gain a seat in the Bundestag. As a party which represents Frisian and Danish minorities in Germany it is not bound by the 5% threshold. The Left party missed that threshold as well and was only able to enter the Bundestag by winning three direct mandates. This was only the fourth time in history that this clause on the minimum number of constituency seats required for party representation in Parliament was applied.

In February 2022, Frank-Walter Steinmeier was elected for a second five-year term as Germany's president. Although a largely ceremonial post, he has been seen as a symbol of consensus and continuity.

In a highly publicized break with her former party, The Left, Sahra Wagenknecht formed her own left-wing but culturally and socially conservative populist party, the Sahra Wagenknecht Alliance in 2024. Along with 9 other former members of The Left who held on to their seats in the Bundestag after leaving the party, they held 1.36% of mandates and cost The Left party its status as a parliamentary group.

On 6 November 2024, chancellor Olaf Scholz dismissed Christian Lindner from his post as finance minister, starting the 2024 German government crisis. After the FDP left the coalition, Scholz announced a vote of confidence which he lost. President Steinmeier dissolved the Bundestag on 27 December 2024, paving the way for new federal elections in Germany.

Elections for the 21st German Bundestag were held on 23 February 2025. The CDU/CSU came first with 28.6% of the vote and the SPD suffering their worst result in German history with only 16.4% of the vote, hence losing the chancellorship. Following the elections CDU/CSU and SPD formed a coalition and the Bundestag elected Friedrich Merz as chancellor on 6 May 2025. This marked the first time in the history of the Federal Republic of Germany that a chancellor was elected only in a second voting round.

== Constitution ==
Seats in the Bundestag after the 2005 elections: The Left: 54 seats SPD: 222 seats Alliance 90/The Greens: 51 seats FDP: 61 seats CDU: 180 seats CSU: 46 seats

Seats in the Bundestag after the 2009 elections: The Left: 76 seats SPD: 146 seats Alliance 90/The Greens: 68 seats FDP: 93 seats CDU: 194 seats CSU: 45 seats

Seats in the Bundestag after the 2013 elections: The Left: 64 seats SPD: 193 seats Alliance 90/The Greens: 63 seats CDU: 255 seats CSU: 56 seats

Seats in the Bundestag after the 2017 elections: The Left: 69 seats SPD: 153 seats Alliance 90/The Greens: 67 seats FDP: 80 seats CDU: 200 seats CSU: 46 seats AfD: 94 seats

The "Basic Law for the Federal Republic of Germany" (Grundgesetz der Bundesrepublik Deutschland) is the Constitution of Germany. It was formally approved on 8 May 1949, and, with the signature of the Allies of World War II on 12 May, came into effect on 23 May, as the constitution of those states of West Germany that were initially included within the Federal Republic. The 1949 Basic Law is a response to the perceived flaws of the 1919 Weimar Constitution, which failed to prevent the rise of the Nazi party in 1933. Since 1990, in the course of the reunification process after the fall of the Berlin Wall, the Basic Law also applies to the eastern states of the former German Democratic Republic.

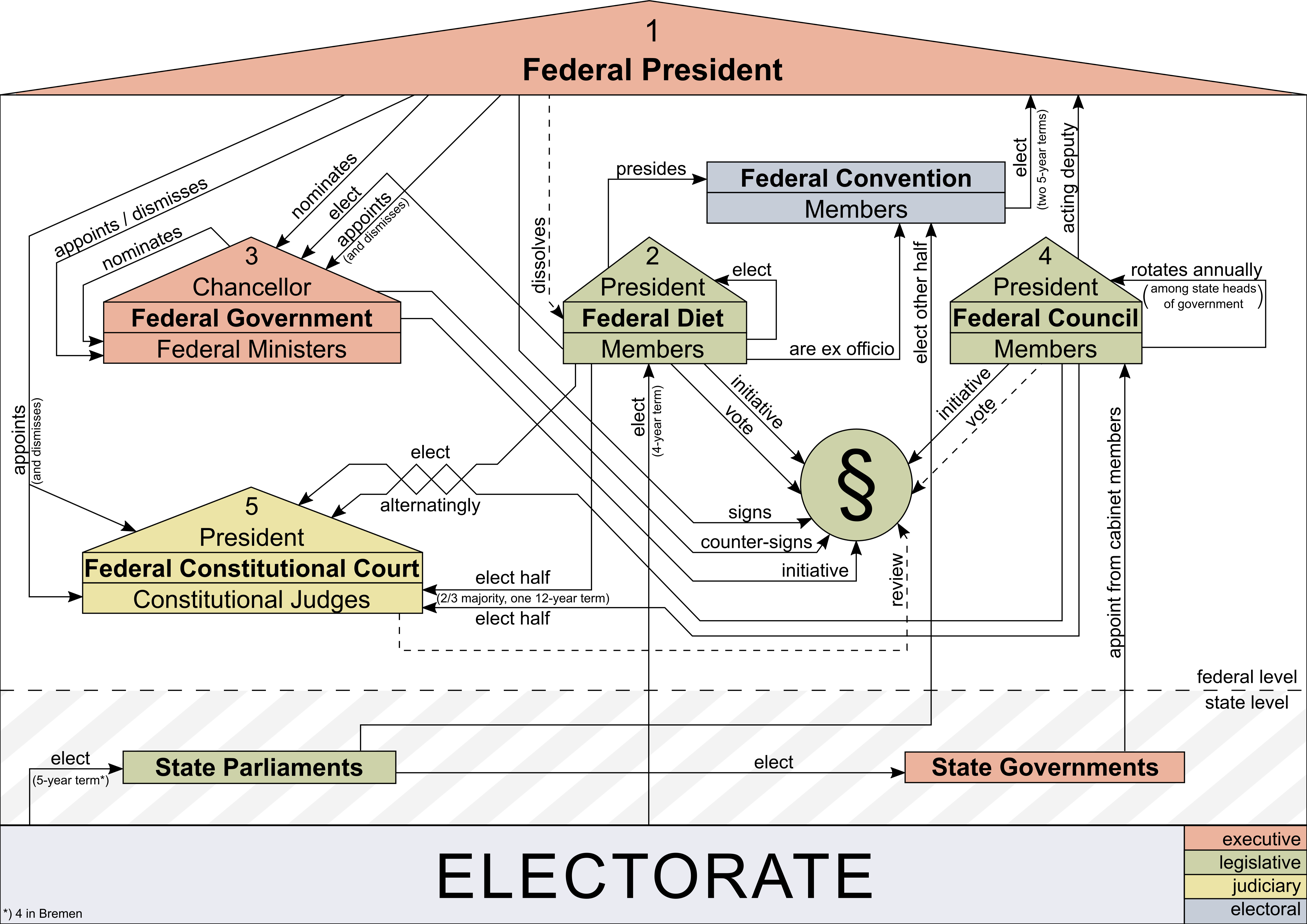
The political system of Germany

== Executive ==
=== Head of state ===
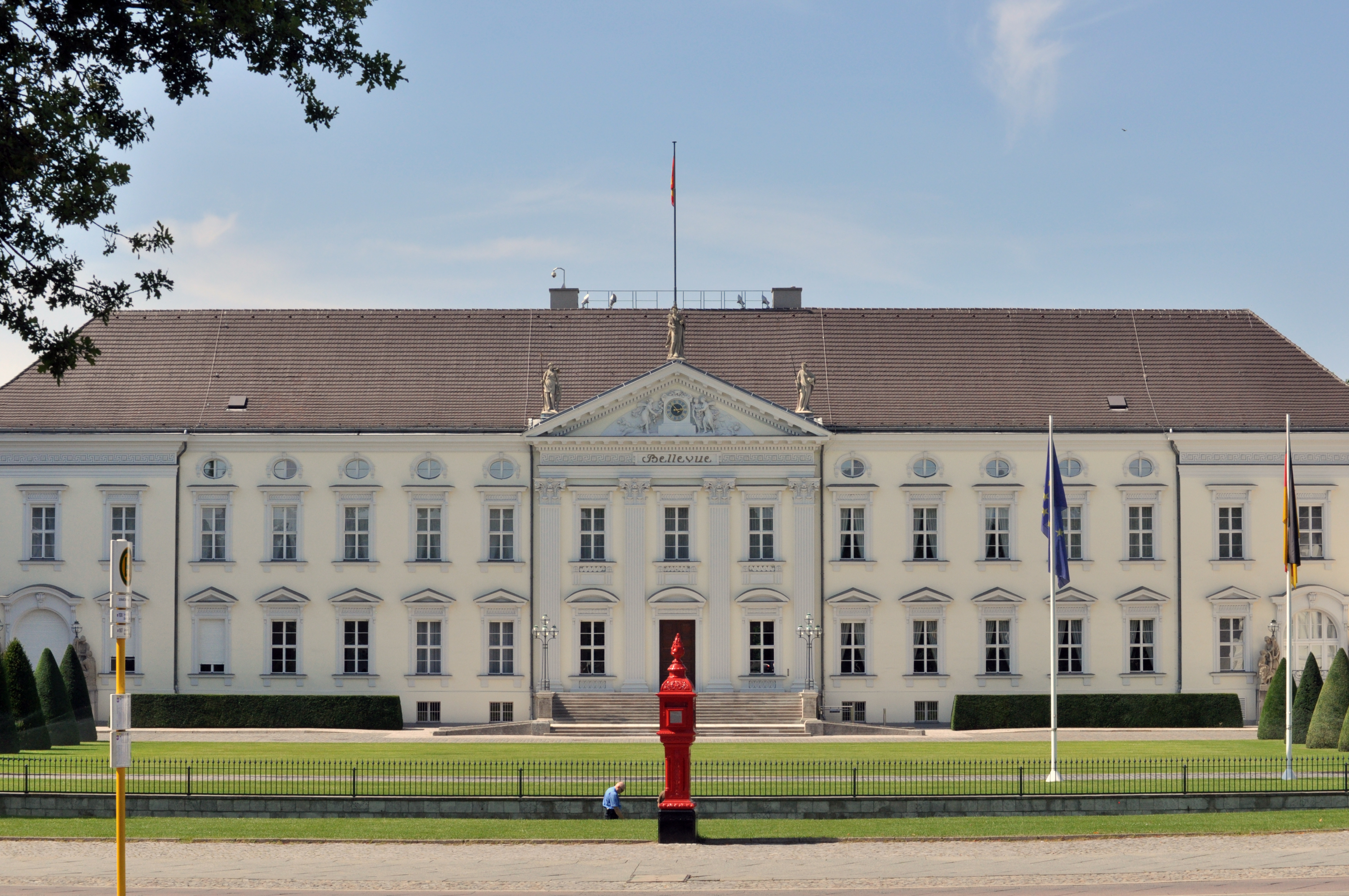
Bellevue Palace

The German head of state is the federal president. As in Germany's parliamentary system of government, the federal chancellor runs the government and day-to-day politics, while the role of the federal president is mostly ceremonial. The federal president, by their actions and public appearances, represents the state itself, its existence, its legitimacy, and unity. Their office involves an integrative role. Nearly all actions of the federal president become valid only after a countersignature of a government member of Germany.

The president is not obliged by Constitution to refrain from political views. The president is expected to give direction to general political and societal debates, but not in a way that is linked to party politics. Most German presidents were active politicians and party members prior to the office, which means that they have to change their political style when becoming president. The function comprises the official residence of Bellevue Palace.

Under Article 59 (1) of the Basic Law, the federal president represents the Federal Republic of Germany in matters of international law, concludes treaties with foreign states on its behalf, and accredits diplomats.

All federal laws must be signed by the president before they can come into effect. The president does not have a formal veto, but the conditions for refusing to sign a law on the basis of unconstitutionality are the subject of debate. The office is currently held by Frank-Walter Steinmeier (since 2017).

The federal president does have a role in the political system, especially at the establishment of a new government and the dissolution of the Bundestag (parliament). This role is usually nominal but can become significant in case of political instability. Additionally, a federal president together with the Federal Council can support the government in a "legislatory emergency state" to enable laws against the will of the Bundestag (Article 81 of the Basic Law). However, so far the federal president has never had to use these "reserve powers".

=== Head of government ===
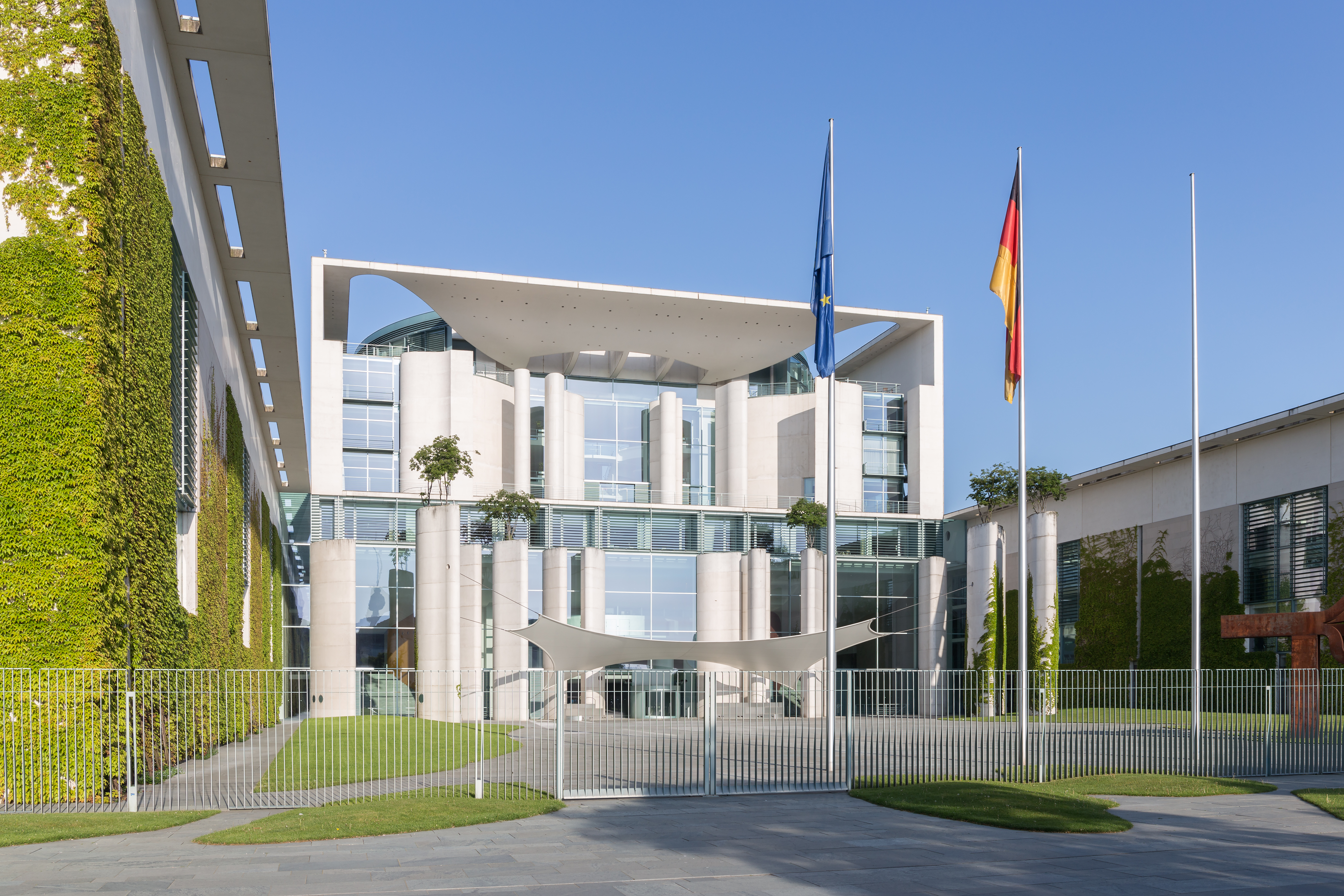
German Chancellery

The Bundeskanzler (federal chancellor) heads the Bundesregierung (federal government) and thus the executive branch of the federal government. They are elected by and responsible to the Bundestag, Germany's parliament. The other members of the government are the federal ministers; they are chosen by the Chancellor. Germany, like the United Kingdom, can thus be classified as a parliamentary system. The office is currently held by Friedrich Merz (since 2025).

The Chancellor cannot be removed from office during a four-year term unless the Bundestag has agreed on a successor. This constructive vote of no confidence is intended to avoid a similar situation to that of the Weimar Republic in which the executive did not have enough support in the legislature to govern effectively, but the legislature was too divided to name a successor. The current system also prevents the Chancellor from calling a snap election.

Except in the periods 1969–1972 and 1976–1982, when the Social Democratic party of Chancellors Brandt and Schmidt came in second in the elections, the chancellor has always been the candidate of the largest party, usually supported by a coalition of two parties with a majority in the parliament. The chancellor appoints one of the federal ministers as their deputy, who has the unofficial title Vice Chancellor (German: Vizekanzler). The office is currently held by Lars Klingbeil (since 2025).

=== Cabinet ===
The German Cabinet (Bundeskabinett or Bundesregierung) is the chief executive body of the Federal Republic of Germany. It consists of the chancellor and the cabinet ministers. The fundamentals of the cabinet's organization are set down in articles 62–69 of the Basic Law.

=== Agencies ===
Agencies with head offices outside of Berlin and Bonn (Hover mouse over pog to popup clickable link.)

Agencies of the German government include:

- Federal Intelligence Service (Bundesnachrichtendienst)
- Federal Bureau of Aircraft Accident Investigation (Bundesstelle für Flugunfalluntersuchung)
- Federal Aviation Office (Luftfahrt-Bundesamt)
- Federal Bureau for Maritime Casualty Investigation (Bundesstelle für Seeunfalluntersuchung)
- Federal Maritime and Hydrographic Agency (Bundesamt für Seeschifffahrt und Hydrographie)
- Federal Railway Accident Investigation Board (Eisenbahn-Unfalluntersuchungsstelle des Bundes)
- Federal Railway Authority (Eisenbahn-Bundesamt)

== Legislature ==
Federal legislative power is divided between the Bundestag and the Bundesrat. The Bundestag is directly elected by the German people, while the Bundesrat represents the governments of the regional states (Länder). The federal legislature has powers of exclusive jurisdiction and concurrent jurisdiction with the states in areas specified in the constitution.

The Bundestag is more powerful than the Bundesrat and only needs the latter's consent for proposed legislation related to revenue shared by the federal and state governments, and the imposition of responsibilities on the states. In practice, however, the agreement of the Bundesrat in the legislative process is often required, since federal legislation frequently has to be executed by state or local agencies. In the event of disagreement between the Bundestag and the Bundesrat, either side can appeal to the Vermittlungsausschuss (Mediation Committee), a conference committee-like body of 16 Bundesrat and 16 Bundestag members, to find a compromise.

=== Bundestag ===
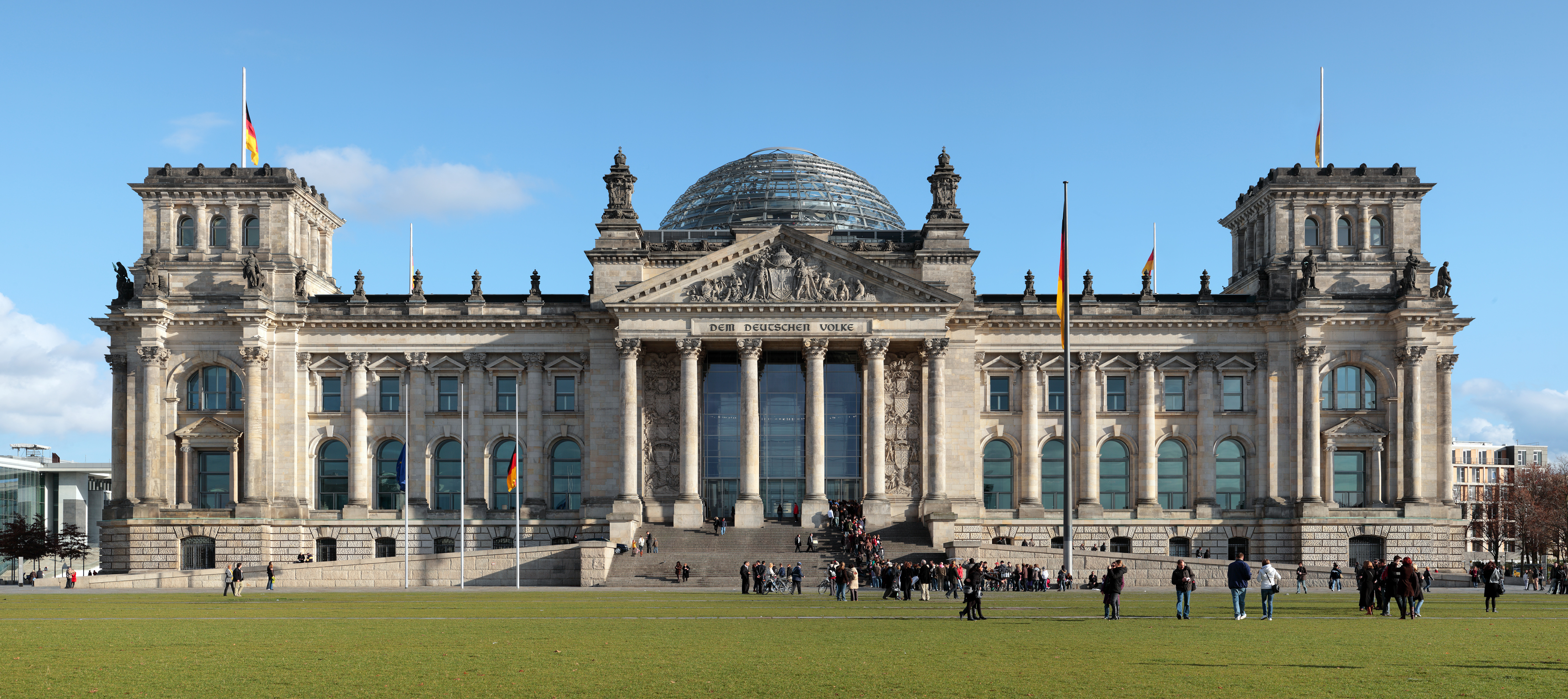
Reichstag building

The Bundestag (Federal Diet) is elected for a four-year term and consists of 630 members elected by a means of a personalised and localised proportional representation system. 299 members represent single-seat constituencies and are elected by a first-past-the-post electoral system (Direktmandat), where others (Listenkandidat) are elected from a state list.

A party must receive either 5% of the national vote or three direct constituencies to be eligible for non-constituency seats in the Bundestag. This rule, often called the "five-percent hurdle", was incorporated into Germany's election law to prevent political fragmentation and minority parties from becoming disproportionately influential. Parties representing ethnic minorities are exempt from this threshold.

Parties that obtain fewer constituency seats than their national share of the vote are allotted seats from state party lists to make up the difference. In contrast, parties that obtain more constituency seats than their national share of the vote are allowed to keep these so-called overhang seats. In federal elections since 2013, other parties obtain extra seats ("balance seats") that offset advantages from their rivals' overhang seats. The current Bundestag is the largest in German history with 736 members.

A 2023 reform of German election law limits the size of the Bundestag to 630 members for upcoming federal elections.

The first Bundestag elections were held in the Federal Republic of Germany ("West Germany") on 14 August 1949. Following reunification, elections for the first all-German Bundestag were held on 2 December 1990. The last federal election was held on 23 February 2025.

== Judiciary ==
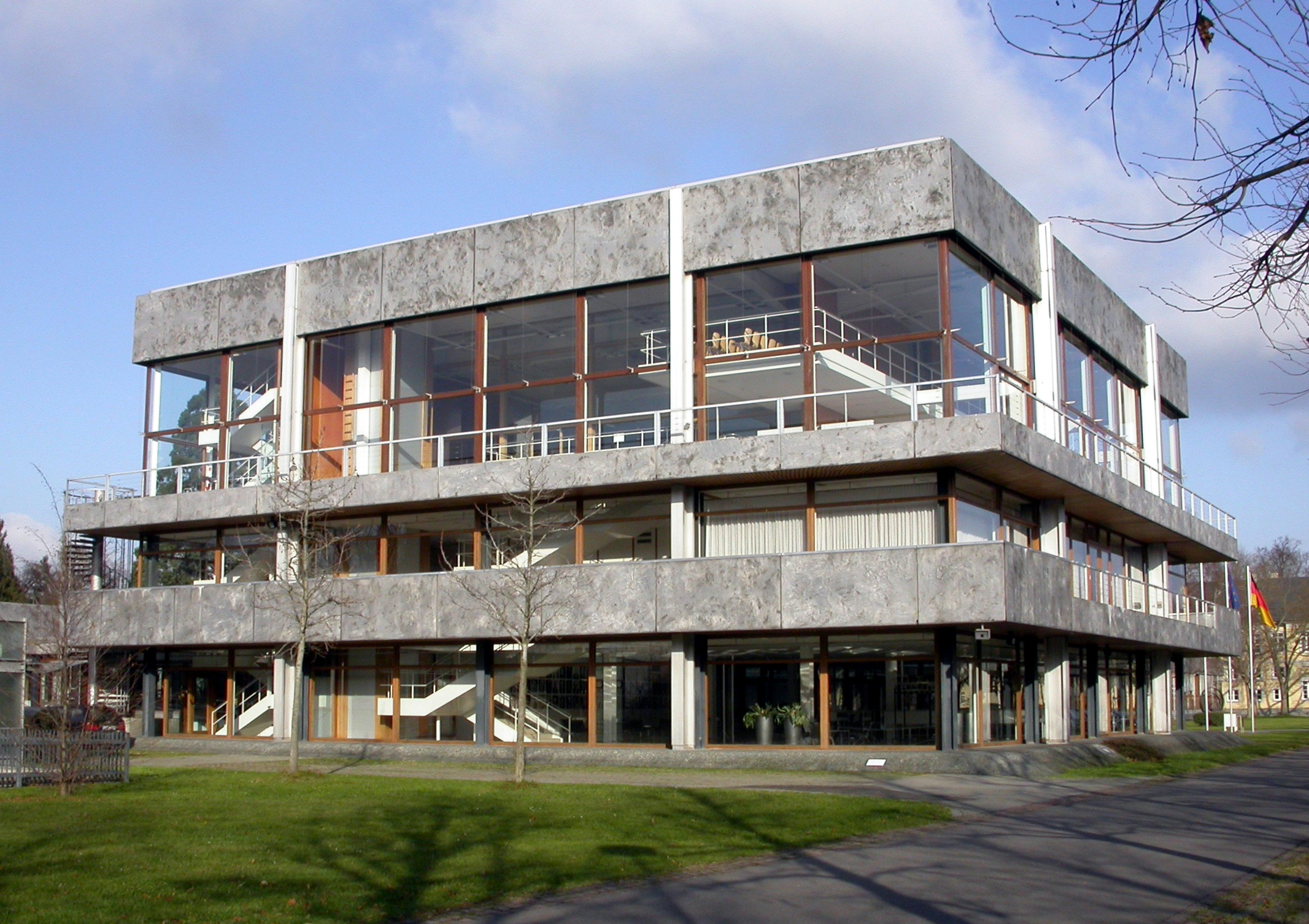
Constitutional court in Karlsruhe

Germany follows the civil law tradition. The judicial system comprises three types of courts.

- Ordinary courts, dealing with criminal and most civil cases, are the most numerous by far. The Federal Court of Justice of Germany (Bundesgerichtshof) is the highest ordinary court and also the highest court of appeals.
- Specialized courts hear cases related to administrative, labour, social, fiscal and patent law.
- Constitutional court focus on judicial review and constitutional interpretation. The Federal Constitutional Court (Bundesverfassungsgericht) is the highest court dealing with constitutional matters.

The main difference between the Federal Constitutional Court and the Federal Court of Justice is that the Federal Constitutional Court may only be called if a constitutional matter within a case is in question (e.g. a possible violation of human rights in a criminal trial), while the Federal Court of Justice may be called in any case.

== Policy ==
A 2026 opinion poll found the most common political issues in Germany were economy, heat waves, immigration, pensions and job security.

=== Foreign relations ===
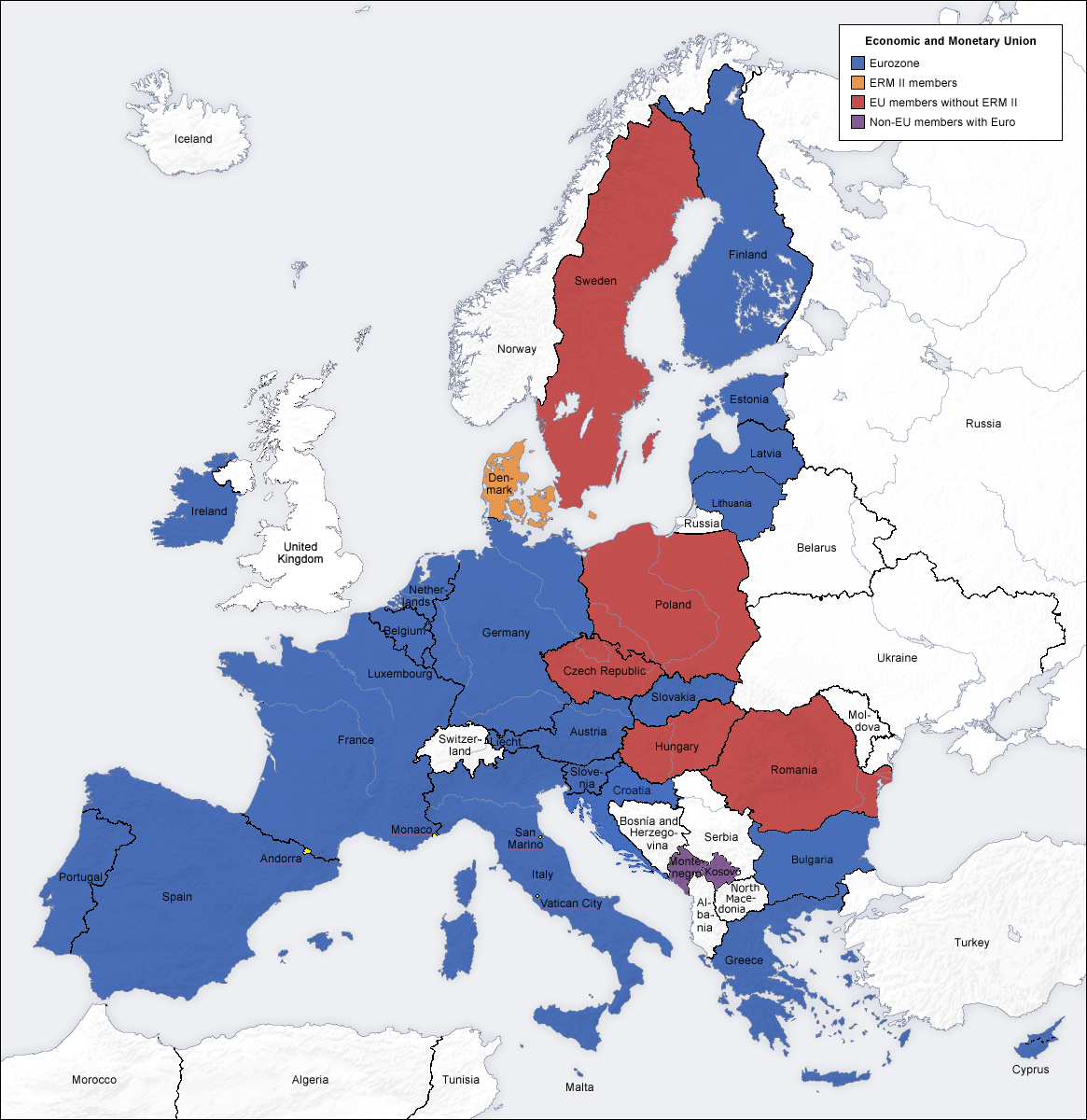
Germany is a member of the European Union and the eurozone.

Germany maintains a network of 229 diplomatic missions abroad and holds relations with more than 190 countries. It is the largest contributor to the budget of the European Union (providing 27%) and third largest contributor to the United Nations (providing 8%). Germany is a member of the NATO defence alliance, the Organisation of Economic Co-operation and Development (OECD), the G7, the G20, the World Bank and the International Monetary Fund (IMF).

Germany has played a leading role in the European Union since its inception and has maintained a strong alliance with France since the end of World War II. The alliance was especially close in the late 1980s and early 1990s under the leadership of Christian Democrat Helmut Kohl and Socialist François Mitterrand. Germany is at the forefront of European states seeking to advance the creation of a more unified European political, defence, and security apparatus. For a number of decades after WWII, the Federal Republic of Germany kept a notably low profile in international relations, because of both its recent history and its occupation by foreign powers.

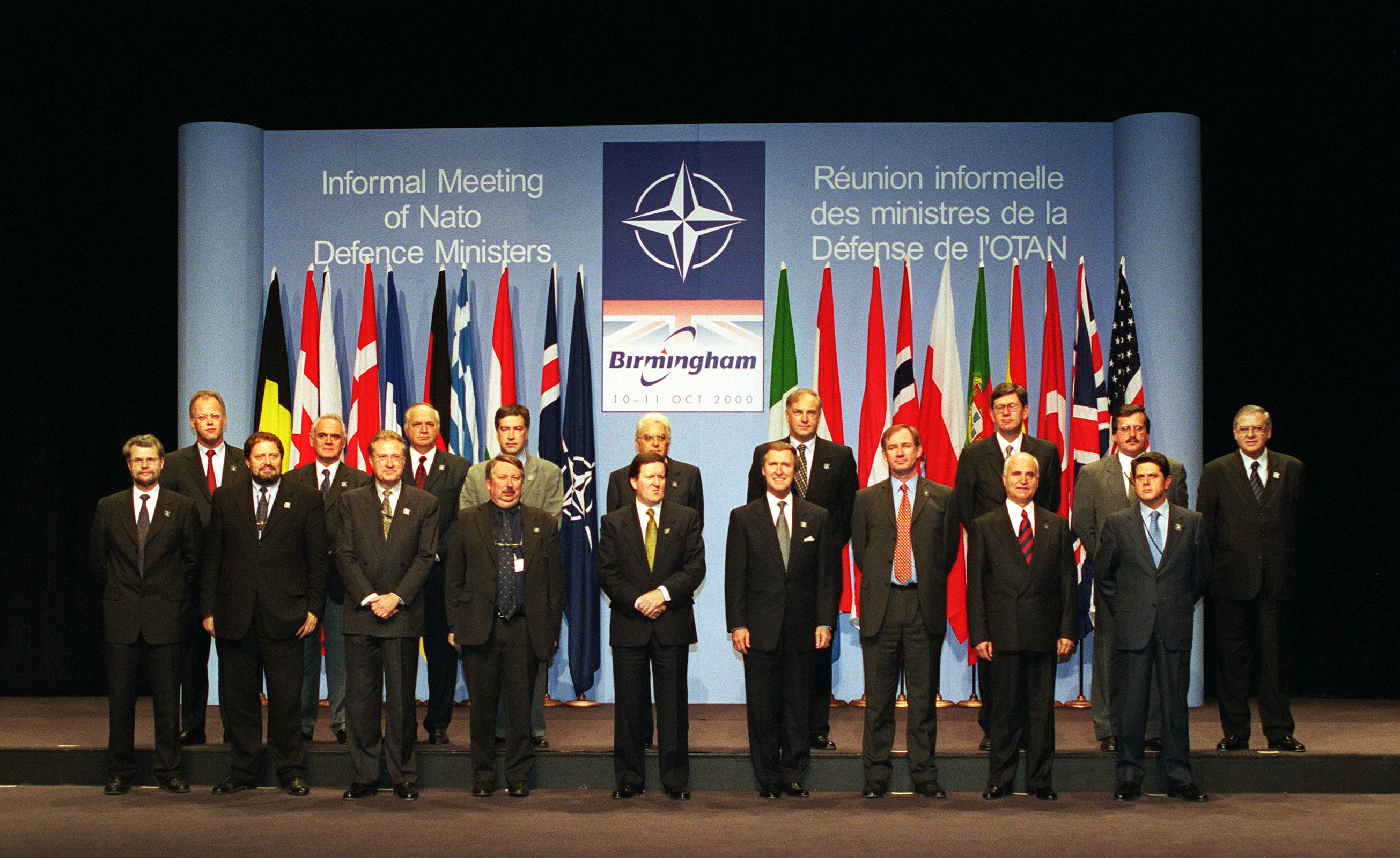
Defence Ministers of the NATO member states in 2000, an organisation West Germany joined in 1955

During the Cold War, Germany's partition by the Iron Curtain made it a symbol of East–West tensions and a political battleground in Europe. However, Willy Brandt's Ostpolitik was a key factor in the détente of the 1970s. In 1999, Chancellor Gerhard Schröder's government defined a new basis for German foreign policy by taking a full part in the decisions surrounding the NATO war against Yugoslavia and by sending German troops into combat for the first time since World War II.

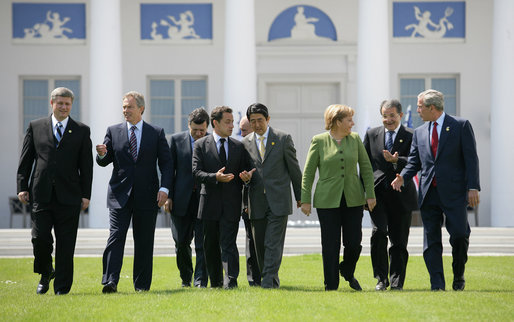
Chancellor Angela Merkel, the head of government, hosting the G8 summit in Heiligendamm (2007)

The governments of Germany and the United States are close political allies. The 1948 Marshall Plan and strong cultural ties have crafted a strong bond between the two countries, although Schröder's very vocal opposition to the Iraq War had suggested the end of Atlanticism and a relative cooling of German–American relations. The two countries are also economically interdependent: 5.0% of German exports in goods are US-bound and 3.5% of German imported goods originate from the US with a trade deficit of -63,678.5 million dollars for the United States (2017). Other signs of the close ties include the continuing position of German–Americans as the largest reported ethnic group in the US, and the status of Ramstein Air Base (near Kaiserslautern) as the largest US military community outside the US.

In 1952 the German government agreed to pay reparations to the Jewish state of Israel amounting to 3 billion marks, equivalent to $8.8 billion today, for the costs of "resettling so great a number of uprooted and destitute Jewish refugees" after the Second World War, and for compensating individual Jews for the losses of livelihood and property due to Nazi persecution, after there emerged a clear moral imperative for societal and political leaders to confront the past. Diplomatic relations were eventually established in 1965 after significant reconciliation efforts, particularly from religious institutions such as the German Coordinating-Council for Christian-Jewish cooperation and the Action Reconciliation Service for Peace. This context means that there is a special relationship between Germany and Israel which continues to the present day.

The policy on foreign aid is an important area of German foreign policy. It is formulated by the Federal Ministry for Economic Cooperation and Development (BMZ) and carried out by the implementing organisations. The German government sees development policy as a joint responsibility of the international community. In 2024 Germany was the second biggest donor of development cooperation after the United States, spending 32.4 billion USD, equivalent to 0.67% of GNI, on Official development assistance.

== Administrative divisions ==
Germany comprises sixteen states that are collectively referred to as Länder. Due to differences in size and population, the subdivision of these states varies especially between city-states (Stadtstaaten) and states with larger territories (Flächenländer). For regional administrative purposes five states, namely Baden-Württemberg, Bavaria, Hesse, North Rhine-Westphalia and Saxony, consist of a total of 22 government districts (Regierungsbezirke). As of 2009 Germany is divided into 403 districts (Kreise) on municipal level, these consist of 301 rural districts and 102 urban districts.

| Map (Clickable) | State | Capital | Area (km^{2}) | Population |
|---|---|---|---|---|
| | Baden-Württemberg | Stuttgart | 35,752 | 10,717,000 |
| | Bavaria | Munich | 70,549 | 12,444,000 |
| | Berlin | Berlin | 892 | 3,400,000 |
| | Brandenburg | Potsdam | 29,477 | 2,568,000 |
| | Bremen | Bremen | 404 | 663,000 |
| | Hamburg | Hamburg | 755 | 1,735,000 |
| | Hesse | Wiesbaden | 21,115 | 6,098,000 |
| | Mecklenburg-Vorpommern | Schwerin | 23,174 | 1,720,000 |
| | Lower Saxony | Hanover | 47,618 | 8,001,000 |
| | North Rhine-Westphalia | Düsseldorf | 34,043 | 18,075,000 |
| | Rhineland-Palatinate | Mainz | 19,847 | 4,061,000 |
| | Saarland | Saarbrücken | 2,569 | 1,056,000 |
| | Saxony | Dresden | 18,416 | 4,296,000 |
| | Saxony-Anhalt | Magdeburg | 20,445 | 2,494,000 |
| | Schleswig-Holstein | Kiel | 15,763 | 2,829,000 |
| | Thuringia | Erfurt | 16,172 | 2,355,000 |

== Coalitions ==
Composition of German states' governing coalitions as of 2024

While East-Germany was under a single-party system, there was only a brief period when the SPD governed West-Germany alone on a federal level as a minority party following the dissolution of its coalition with the FDP in 1982. Otherwise, all governments in West- and post-reunification Germany have been coalitions between two or more parties. In German political tradition, these usually receive a name often based on the parties' colors:

- Grand coalition (describing a governing coalition of the parties Christian Democratic Union (CDU) along with its sister party the Christian Social Union of Bavaria (CSU) and the Social Democratic Party (SPD))
- Traffic light coalition (coalition government of the Social Democratic Party of Germany (SPD), the Free Democratic Party (FDP) and Alliance 90/The Greens)
- Jamaica coalition (describing a governing coalition among the parties of the Christian Democratic Union/Christian Social Union (CDU/CSU), Free Democratic Party (FDP), and the Green Party)
- Black-red-green coalition (a governing coalition among the parties of the Christian Democratic Union (CDU), Social Democratic Party (SPD) and the Green Party)
- Red–red–green coalition (a coalition between the Social Democratic Party of Germany (SPD), The Left, and Alliance 90/The Greens)
- Red–red coalition (a governing coalition among the Social Democratic Party of Germany (SPD) and The Left party or its predecessor, the Party of Democratic Socialism (PDS))

Due to the cordon sanitaire (usually called Brandmauer, firewall, in Germany) all other parties have established against the AfD, hypothetical coalitions involving the AfD are rarely discussed. A coalition of CDU/CSU, AfD and FDP would have had a majority in the 20th Bundestag elected in 2021, but was not seriously discussed publicly by either media or politicians. Such a coalition does not have a common nickname, but the term "Bahamas coalition", in reference to the colors of the flag of the Bahamas (including the AfD's light blue), was coined in 2013.

== East–West Divide ==
Percentage of party votes for AfD in the 2017 federal election

AfD in the 2024 European Parliament election in Germany

The divide between the East and the West Germany can be seen in contemporary German elections. The Alternative for Germany (AfD), a far-right party has a stronghold in the former East Germany. The left-wing populist Die Linke party (which has roots in the SED) used to have a stronghold in the East as well. The far-right National Democratic Party of Germany (NPD) used to have representation in the East where they were stronger. This is in stark distinction from West Germany where the more centrist parties such as the CDU/CSU, SPD, The Greens, and the FDP dominate.

== See also ==
- Anarchism in Germany
- Censorship in Germany
- Conservatism in Germany
- Firewall against the far-right in Germany
- Federalism in Germany
- German governing coalition
- Liberalism in Germany
- List of political parties in Germany
- List of Federal Republic of Germany governments
- Lobbying in Germany
- Party finance in Germany
- Political culture of Germany
- Prohibited political parties in Germany
- Anti-fascism
  - Post–World War II anti-fascism
- Weimar Republic
- Denazification
- Municipal council (Germany)
