= Democratic Republic of the Congo and the International Monetary Fund =

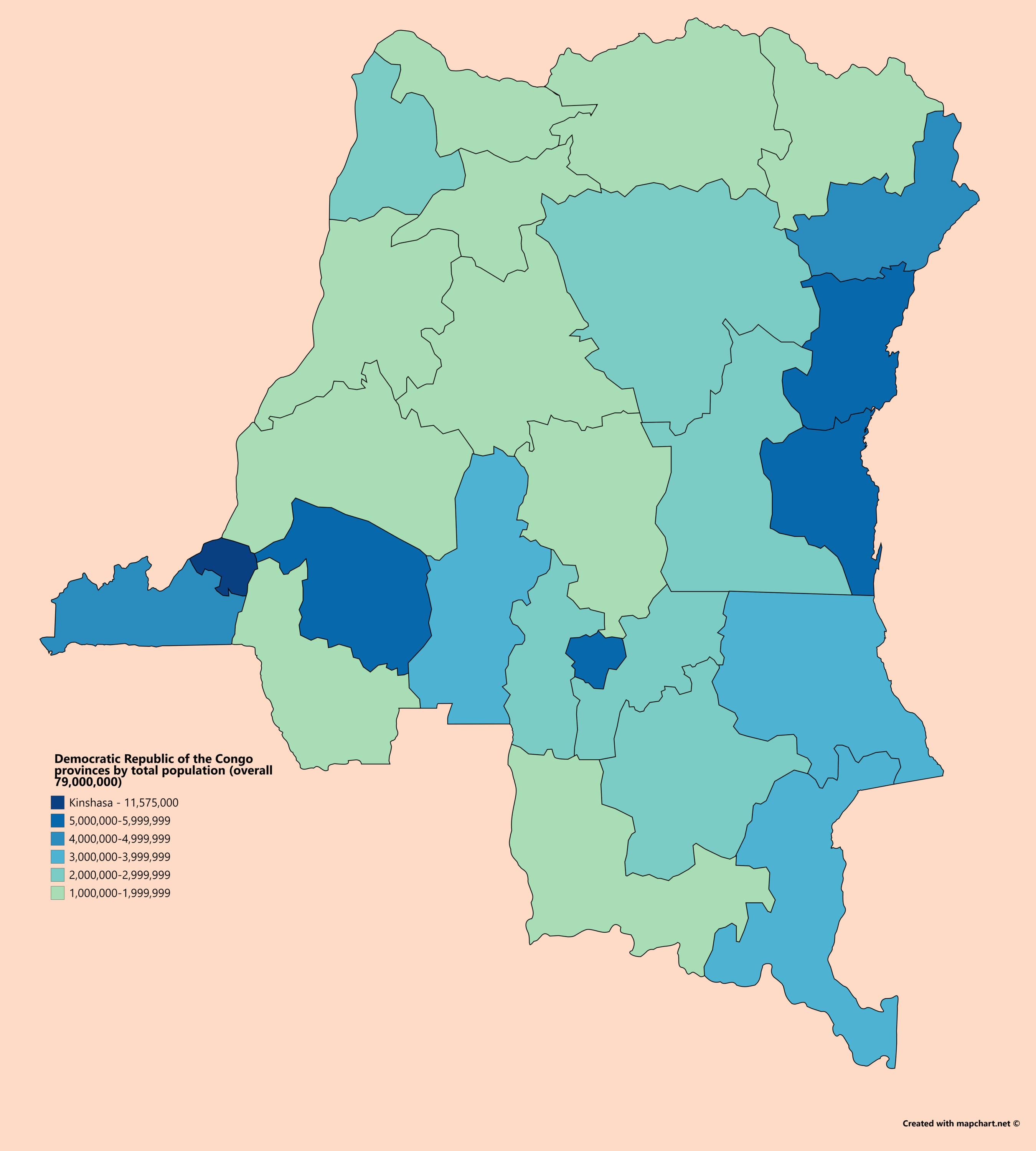
Democratic Republic of Congo provinces by total population (2016).

The Democratic Republic of Congo (DRC) joined the International Monetary Fund (IMF) on September 28, 1963.

== History ==
The large African state entered the Fund nearly two decades after its conception, while Cold War tensions were steadily building. At the time of its incorporation, the nation was named ‘Zaire’, and was seen as key to the national, anti-red interests of the United States of America. Since the year of its joining, the DRC has reached 424.5 million special drawing rights (SDRs), which amounts to .22% of the total number of SDRs in the IMF. The governor is Deogratias Mwana Nyembo Mutombo, and total number of votes the country has is 12,125, which amounts to .24% of the total number of votes in the institution.

== Failed Programs ==
The DRC, in the 1980s, was subject to two fund-related programs. These programs were designed to curb hyperinflation and to generally macroeconomically stabilize the state. The state, at this point in time, had become what is known as a kleptocracy. These initial IMF programs were not successful for three key reasons:

1. The government structure was weak enough to allow a meaningful seepage of power and funds so that aid was not delivered and initiatives could not be passed and enforced.
2. The infrastructure of state was thoroughly underdeveloped, meaning that IMF resources could not be distributed throughout the state.
3. The programs, for the final reason, were based on bad information and conjecture and therefore were predestined to fail. The sort of conditionality which was imposed upon the state was also too stringent given the circumstances; the state was too weak to withstand the typical sort of austerity measures which were heavy-handedly and myopically prescribed in the 80s and 90s.

During this time, the DRC incurred massive amounts of debt. The arrears were so great that they impeded the ability of the state to receive future IMF resources.

== PRGF Eligibility ==
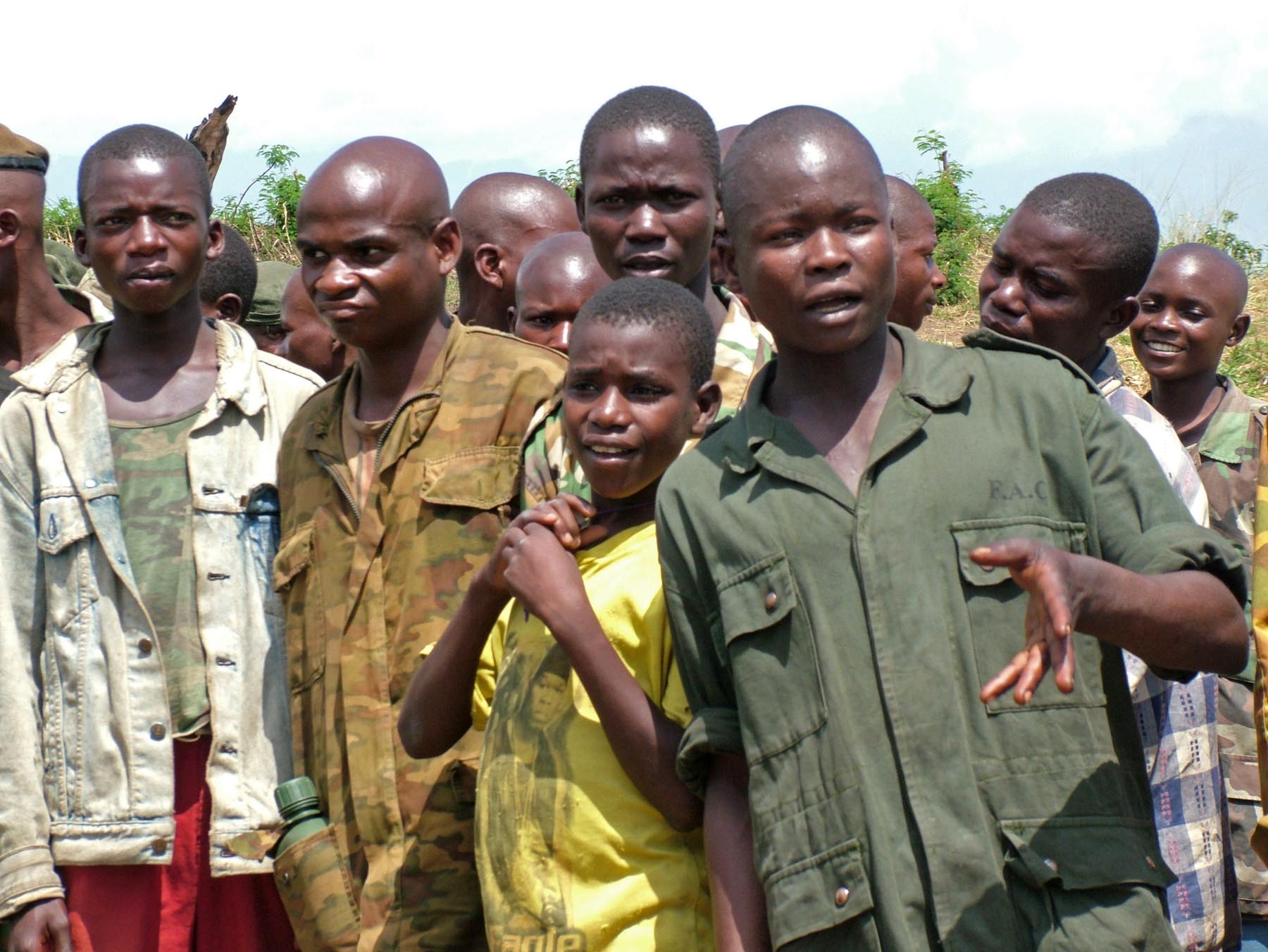
Child Soldiers in the Democratic Republic of Congo

It wasn't until the turn of the century that the IMF established its Poverty Reduction and Growth Facility (PRFG) loan arm. This arm of the IMF was designed for states for which typical sorts of programs and conditionalities would simply be impractical. The emphasis for programs granted and done through the PRFG would be upon pro-poor spending, and infrastructure building. The loans distributed through this arm would be granted at subsidized market rates, making it easier for heavily indentured countries to undertake IMF programs. The DRC was eligible for PRGF programs in the early 2000s; it is in the early 2000s that one finds the IMF interacting with the DRC in constructive ways. Currently, the debt of the DRC constitutes over 100% of its GDP.

== Early 2000s Programs ==
In 2002, the IMF approved a US$750 Million PRFG arrangement for the DRC. The money was to go to post-conflict efforts. More specifically, the money was to go to the development of infrastructure toward the end of the reunification of the state. The aims of the program were the following: increasing the economic growth rate by a percentage point or two, from 1.3% to 3.0%, a resumption of national investment, and a very significant drop in inflation from the three digits, somewhere around 300% to the two, somewhere around 50%. A secondary aim of the program was the fortification of intrastate financial institutions so as to encourage foreign investment. The program was successful in some respects and unsuccessful in others. It was ambitious, enumerating tasks which ought to have been to be done rather than those which would in reality be completed. Infrastructure was built and is being built, however, the government is still weak, the political culture is too varied, and the state is far from unifying.

== 2009 ==
In 2009 the state was approved for a US$551 million loan. This loan was not done through the PRFG arm of the IMF, signifying that the country was experiencing some modicum of improvement. The ends of the 2009 program were the same as the 2002 program, with a little extra emphasis placed upon macroeconomic austerity and a little less emphasis placed upon pro-poor policies. The effects of the 2009 loan and program are ambiguous as the post-conflict state was not very responsive to IMF surveillance in the years to come. The loan served, most lucidly, to exacerbate the debt ratios of the state.

== Current Programs ==
Currently, the DRC is engaged in an IMF PRGF program which is strategically trying to reduce the amount of debt the nation is in. Pro-poor goals are also trying to be met. Poverty reduction and infrastructural development remain ambiguous goals with no real way to set about accomplishing them.
