= Gammon (insult) =

Pejorative term in British political culture

In British political culture, gammon is a pejorative term typically used to describe a specific demographic of older white men who express reactionary or right-wing views, particularly in support of Brexit.

The term was coined in this context in 2017. Visually, it compares the complexion of the subject's face to gammon (a type of cured pork), implying a flushed or pink appearance resulting from anger or raised blood pressure. While cutaneous flushing is a physiological response that occurs in all humans, the insult relies on the specific visibility of this reaction on lighter skin tones, using the meat metaphor as a caricature of the "angry white man" archetype.

== Archetype and usage ==
Proponents of the term use gammon as not merely a physical descriptor but in reference to a state of mind or political disposition. Matt Zarb-Cousin, a former spokesperson for Jeremy Corbyn who is credited with popularising the term's modern political usage, has described the gammon as a person characterised by a refusal to listen to opposing arguments and a tendency to become visibly angry when their political views are challenged.

The term has sparked debate in the UK regarding whether it constitutes a racial slur. Critics have argued that it targets individuals based on their skin colour and age. Defenders of the term, such as commentator Owen Jones, argue that it is a critique of choice and political attitude rather than an attack on innate racial characteristics.

== History ==
=== Early use ===
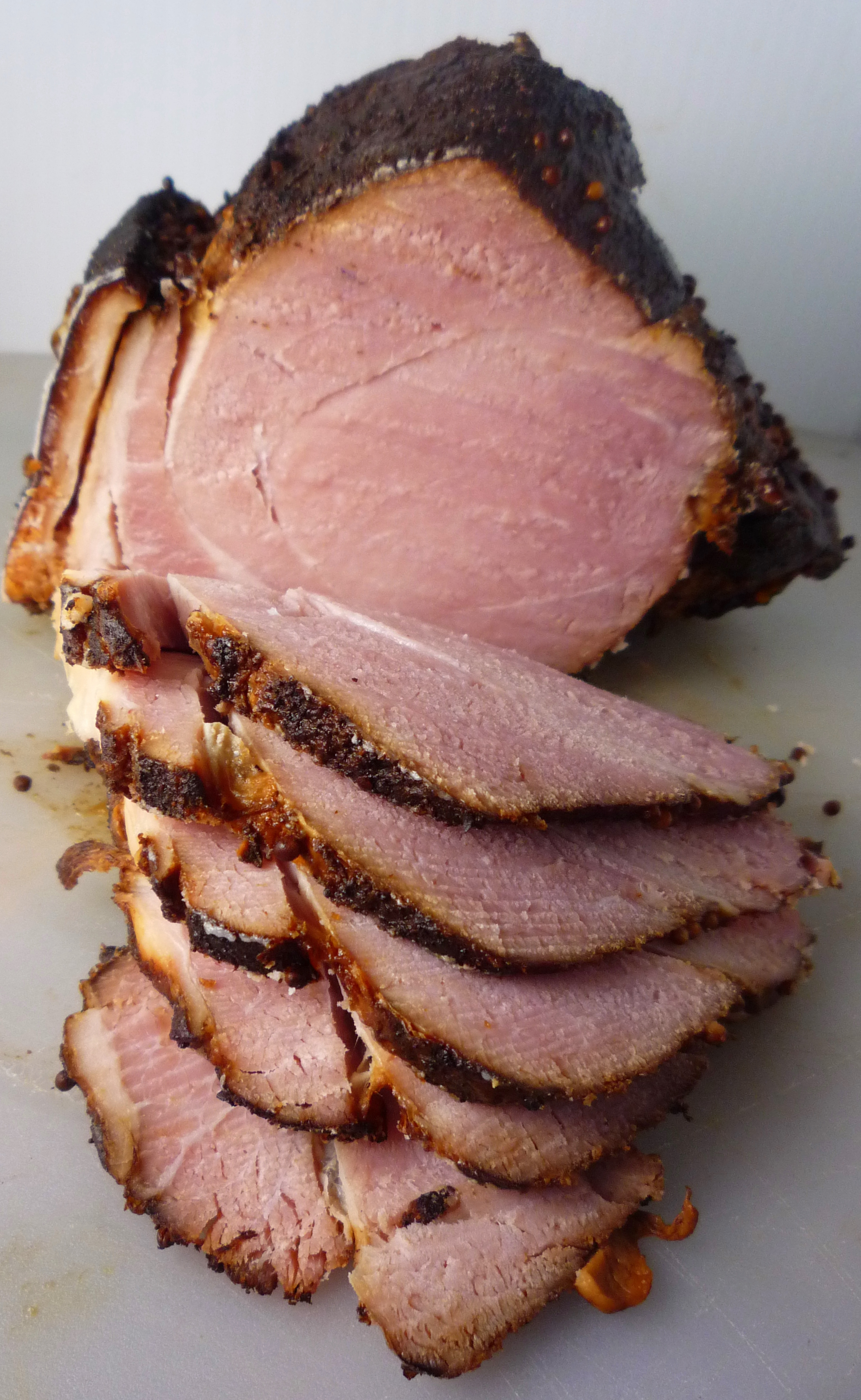
A half-sliced piece of gammon, the visual reference for the term.

The association between the face and cured meat appears in historical literature. In 1604, John Marston wrote "Your devilship's ring has no virtue, the buff-captain, the sallow-westphalian gammon-faced zaza cries" in The Malcontent. In 1838, Charles Dickens used the word gammon in Nicholas Nickleby to mean "nonsense" (a usage that persists in Australian Aboriginal English), but also made comparisons between men and meat in other works.

=== Modern usage ===
The term has been used to describe people's complexion without any political connotation. In 2004, a sports feature in The Observer described Rupert Lowe as the "gammon-cheeked Southampton chairman". In 2010, Caitlin Moran wrote in The Times that Prime Minister David Cameron resembled "a slightly camp gammon robot". In 2015, Ruby Tandoh called Great British Bake Off judge Paul Hollywood a "walking gammon joint".

The term's viral political usage began in 2017 when children's author Ben Davis tweeted a picture of nine members of a BBC Question Time audience, referring to them as "the Great Wall of Gammon". The term became popular in this context, particularly on social media.

== See also ==
- Colonel Blimp
- Disgusted of Tunbridge Wells
- Little Englander
- Karen (slang)
- Asian flush
- Chud (pejorative)
