= Parochial =

Parochial is an adjective which may refer to:

- Parishes, in religion
  - Parish churches, also called parochial churches
  - Parochial church council, body within the Church of England
  - Parochial mission, in the Catholic church
- Parochial political culture, an aspect of a political system
- Parochial schools, primary or secondary schools affiliated to a religious organisation
- Parochialism, in psychology

== See also ==
- Extra-parochial area
