= Prohibited political parties in Germany =

The Communist Party of Germany and the Socialist Reich Party are prohibited political parties in Germany. A third party, Die Heimat — formerly known as the National Democratic Party of Germany — is classified as "anti-constitutional" and is disallowed from receiving public campaign funding, though its activities are otherwise unrestricted. As of 2025, an effort is underway to outlaw the Alternative for Germany.

The procedure for prohibition of a political party involves a judicial process laid-out in the Basic Law for the Federal Republic of Germany and relevant enabling legislation, and decisions are appealable to the European Court of Human Rights. It is philosophically grounded in the German constitutional concept of "militant democracy".

== Background ==
Article 21 of the Basic Law establishes that "political parties may be freely established" with details for their formation and function "regulated by federal laws".

The version of the Federal Republic of Germany's Party Law current, as amended in 2025, was enacted in 1967 and defines political parties as "central entities for the good functioning of democracy". Parties are formed by groups of German citizens who register the party with federal and Lander authorities and, thereafter, can stand candidates in federal and Lander elections. A party is automatically derecognized if it has not named a candidate to any political office in a six-year period, or if it has not submitted a statement of accounts to the Bundestag for a similar period of time. Parties that receive more than a certain number of aggregate votes in an election become eligible for public financing of campaign activities.

== Process of prohibition ==
=== Philosophical basis for party prohibition ===
The constitutional order of the Federal Republic of Germany is based on the concept of streitbare Demokratie ("militant democracy") which posits that the state, as an entity, can suppress individual and corporate freedoms to ensure the perpetuity of democratic governance.

=== Procedural approach to prohibition ===
While many organizations that violate section 86a of the German penal code — related to organizing against the state or using symbols associated with such organizing — can be outlawed by the Federal Ministry of the Interior, entities that successfully organize as political parties have special protections against administrative prohibition.

The standards for the prohibition of political parties in the Federal Republic of Germany are laid-out in Article 21 of the Basic Law and Section 43 of the Federal Constitutional Court Act. According to the court, parties that "in view of their aims or the behaviour of their adherents, seek to undermine or abolish the free democratic basic order or to endanger the existence of the Federal Republic of Germany must be declared unconstitutional".

The court has interpreted these standards to establish two criteria for prohibition, both of which must be met.

Basic Law (Section 2, Article 21)

"Parties that, by reason of their aims or the behaviour of their adherents, seek to undermine or abolish the free democratic basic order or to endanger the existence of the Federal Republic of Germany shall be unconstitutional."

— Basic Law for the Federal Republic of Germany,
- The first criterion is that a party demonstrate an "aggressive and combative attitude" that creates a "climate of fear" with the ultimate aim of abolishing the democratic order or the existence of the Federal Republic of Germany.
- The second criterion, created in 2017, is called "potentiality". The party in question must have the potential to actually implement its anti-democratic objectives to qualify for prohibition. A party that is "entirely unlikely" to undermine democracy or end the existence of the Federal Republic of Germany does not meet the "potentiality" criterion. Factors that might be used to determine "potentiality" include the party's performance in public polling, the extent of the party's representation in elected offices, and the party's resources.

Parties that only meet the first criterion (those that seek to "undermine or abolish" democracy or the German state), but that do not have a realistic chance of achieving their objectives, are considered "anti-constitutional" as opposed to "unconstitutional" and can be prohibited from accessing public campaign financing, but must otherwise be left unmolested in their organizing and electioneering activity.

The court initiates an inquiry, and makes a ruling, only on the request of the Bundesregierung, the Bundestag, the Bundesrat, or the governments of one of the Lander in the case of local parties. Prohibition requires concurrence of a two-thirds majority of the court's justices.

=== Effect of prohibition ===
A prohibited political party has its symbols and logos banned from sale or public display, becomes ineligible for public campaign financing, new organizations are disallowed from forming under its name, candidates may not appear on election ballots with the prohibited party's party identification, and its assets are confiscated.

=== Appeal to the ECHR ===
Germany is a state party to the European Convention on Human Rights. Party prohibitions in Germany imposed by the Federal Constitutional Court can be appealed to the European Court of Human Rights (ECHR) where they would be subject to scrutiny under a standard adopted by the latter court in the early 2000s. Under this standard, a political party can only be prohibited in a signatory state upon: (a) demonstration that the party's leaders or members have made speeches, publications, or other acts that advocate a vision "incompatible with the concept of a democratic society", (b) a showing that the speeches, publications, or other acts are representative of the party as a whole, (c) "plausible evidence" of an "imminent threat" to democracy if the party's continued existence is allowed. Upon passing these three criteria, a ban is permitted "only in the most serious cases".

Plausible evidence in European law is evidence that appears credible and likely to be true, while demonstration of an "imminent threat" involves, according to Sottiaux and Rummens, the showing of such evidence related to the significance of "a party's size, its election results, its opportunities for actual government participation ... [and] its power to influence public opinion". Reservation of the banning mechanism for "only the most serious cases" requires demonstration that less onerous methods of mitigating the threat short of an outright ban have either been exhausted or are unlikely to prove effective.

As of 2022, the only ban upheld by the ECHR on appeal is the 2003 case of Turkey's Welfare Party.

== Prohibited parties ==
The Nazi Party was prohibited on October 10, 1945, following the legal decimation of the German Reich and by a decree of the Allied Control Council acting as the successor to the defunct German state.

After the founding of the Federal Republic of Germany, the Socialist Reich Party was formed by surviving Nazi Party functionaries as the Nazi Party's recreation. In 1952, the Federal Constitutional Court prohibited that party. This was followed, in 1956, by a prohibition on the Communist Party of Germany.

=== Other attempts at prohibiting parties ===
==== Free German Workers Party and the National Liste ====
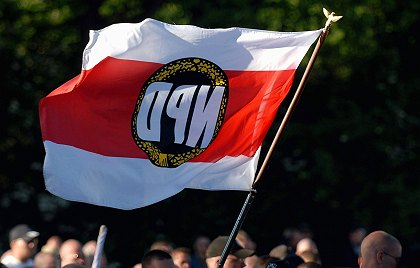
The flag of the National Democratic Party of Germany (NPD) shown in a 2008 photo. There have been multiple attempts to declare the NPD unconstitutional or anti-constitutional.

Attempts to prohibit the Free German Workers' Party and the National Liste in 1994 both failed as neither met the statutory qualifications for classification as a political party; both were subsequently outlawed under alternate legal mechanisms applicable to non-party associations.

==== National Democratic Party of Germany ====
In 2003, 2016, and 2021 the Federal Constitutional Court was asked to consider classifying the National Democratic Party of Germany as unconstitutional.

In the first case, in 2003, the court declined to act after it was discovered informants working on behalf of the Federal Office for the Protection of the Constitution had infiltrated the party's executive echelons to such a degree that the German government was, itself, partly in control of the party's operation. Government agents held leadership offices in the party and, according to the court, were able to order the party undertake illegal acts so as to generate the evidence needed to ban it; it was impossible, the court concluded, to disentangle which actions the party was taking of its own volition and which it was doing under direction of the government.

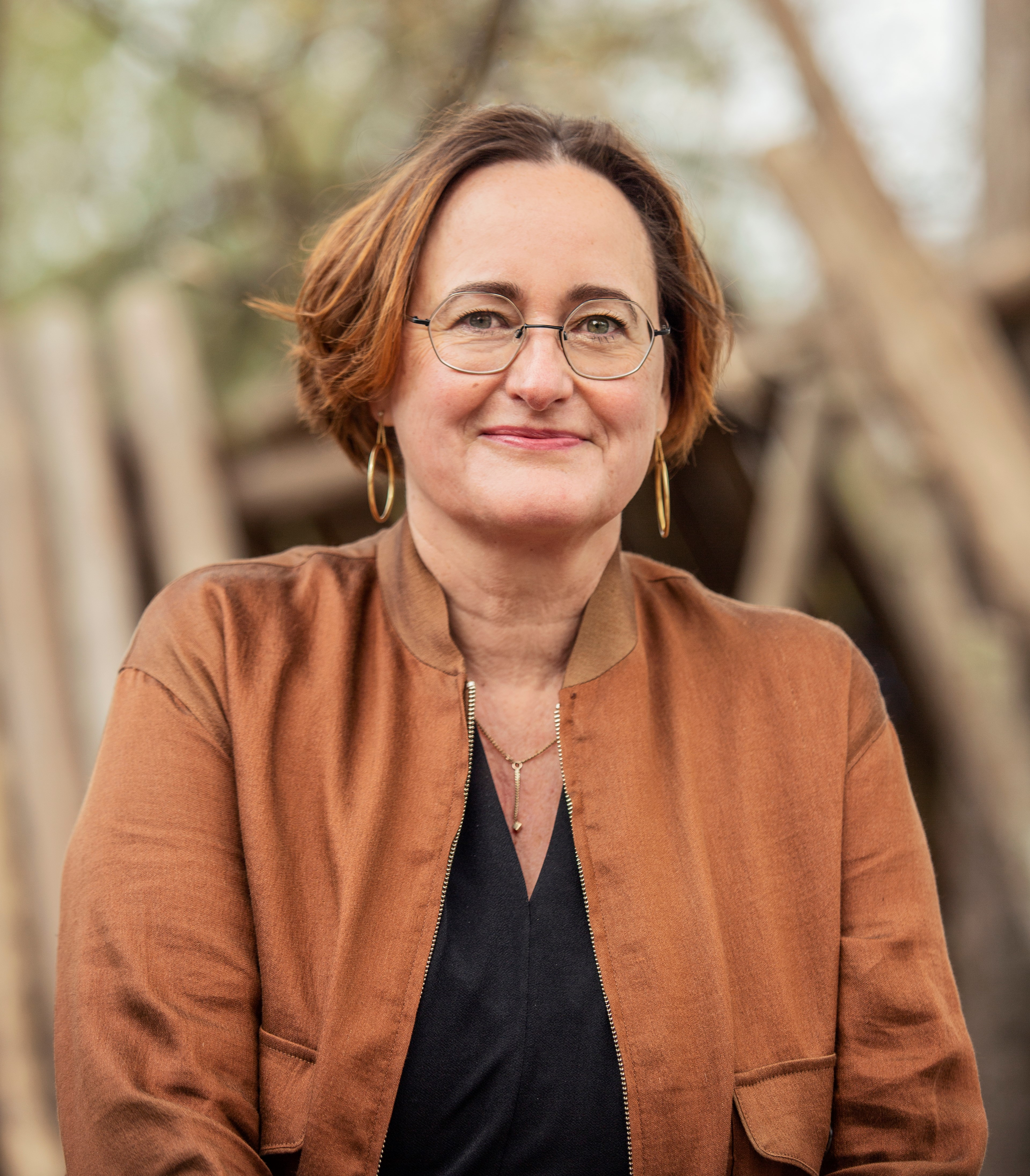
In 2024, Martina Renner (pictured) and other Bundestag members called for the prohibition of Alternative for Germany.

In the second case, in 2016, the court found that while the party sought to undermine the democratic order, it did not actually present a serious threat of doing so. The case was hampered by the discovery that the Federal Office for the Protection of the Constitution had shredded some of its evidentiary files related to the party in advance of the matter being brought to the court.

In 2021, the party was finally decreed anti-constitutional, resulting in it being prohibited from accessing state funds allocated to political parties, the first time such a sanction had been imposed on a political party not also banned. The ruling, a lesser determination than unconstitutionality, left the party otherwise free to carry-out its activities.

==== Alternative for Germany ====
In 2024, Carmen Wegge, Martina Renner and other members of the Bundestag advanced a resolution calling for the Federal Constitutional Court to initiate an inquiry into the prohibition of Alternative for Germany. On January 30, 2025, the Bundestag debated the matter and agreed to forward the question to a parliamentary committee for further consideration.

== See also ==
- Politics of Germany
- List of banned political parties
