= Gammon (meat) =

Type of pork

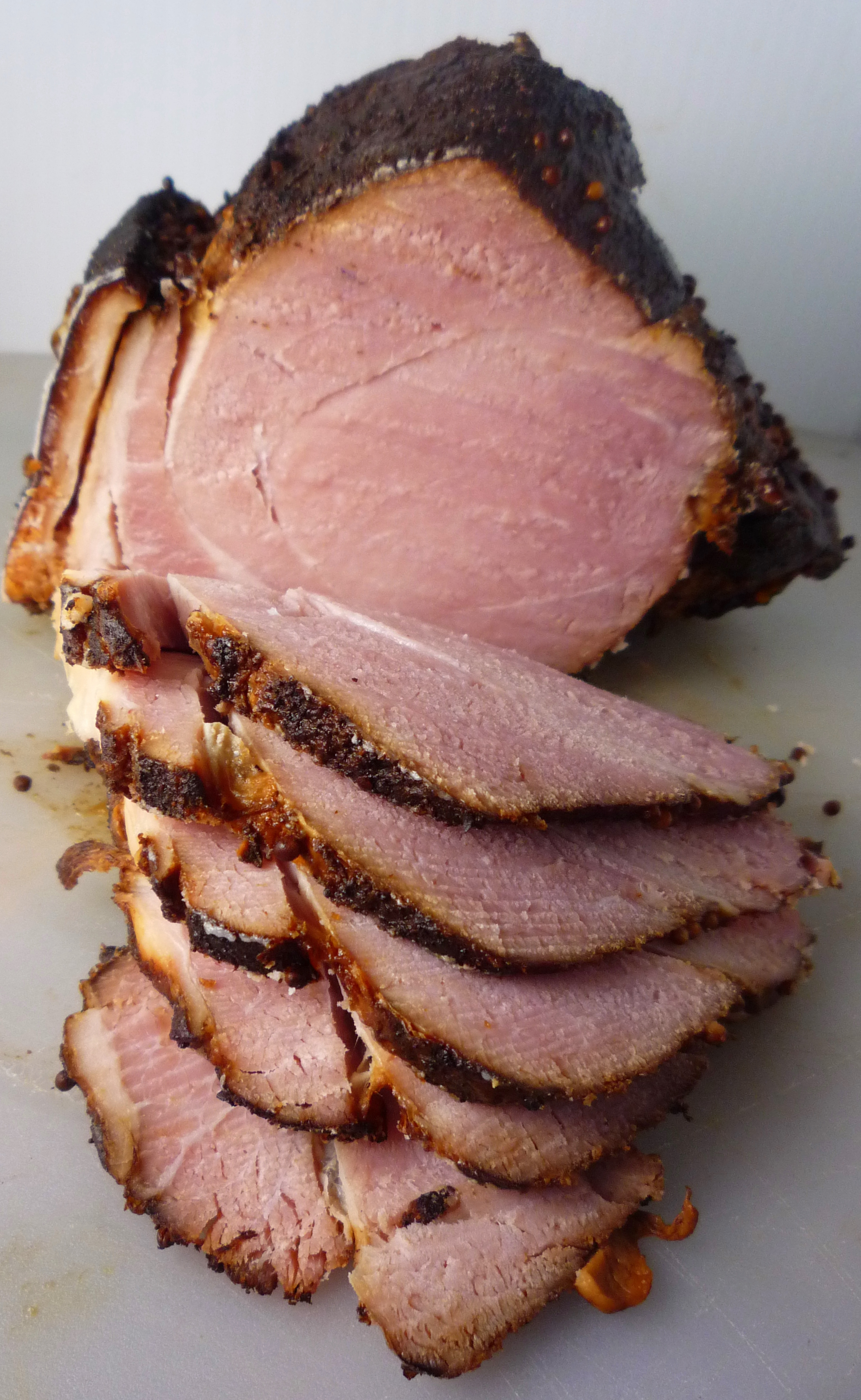
Sliced gammon

In British and Irish cuisine, gammon is the hind leg of pork after it has been cured by dry-salting or brining, and may or may not be smoked. In the United Kingdom and Ireland, joints of cooked gammon are often served at Christmas, but is produced and sold throughout the year. The word gammon is derived from the Middle English word for ham, gambon, which is attested since the early 15th century.

== Description ==
In British and Irish cuisine, gammon is the hind leg of pork after it has been cured by dry-salting or brining, and may or may not be smoked. Strictly speaking, a gammon is the bottom end of a whole side of bacon (which includes the back leg); ham is just the back leg cured on its own. Like bacon it must be cooked before it can be eaten; in that sense gammon is comparable to fresh pork meat, and different from dry-cured ham like jamón serrano or prosciutto. The term is mostly used in the United Kingdom and Ireland; other dialects of English largely make no distinction between gammon and ham.

Ham hock, gammon hock, or knuckle, is the back end of the joint, and contains more connective tissue and sinew.

== Traditions ==
In the United Kingdom and Ireland, joints of cooked gammon are often served at Christmas, but is produced and sold throughout the year. It can be found in most supermarkets either as a full joint or sliced into steaks, which can then be cooked via pan frying or grilling in a manner similar to bacon.

== Etymology ==
The word gammon is derived from the Middle English word for ham, gambon, which is attested since the early 15th century and derived from Old North French gambon, itself derived from Old French jambon, which is identical to the modern French word for 'ham'. Old French jambon is attested since the 13th century and is derived from Old French jambe (gambe in Old North French) which in turn is derived from the Late Latin gamba, meaning "leg/hock of a horse/animal". Gamba can be traced to Greek kampe (κάμπη) meaning "a bending/a joint", which is from Proto-Indo-European *kamp- ('to bend; crooked'). In some English dialects gambol, which is similarly derived, refers to a leg.

In the 19th century, the word (sometimes extended to the phrase "gammon and spinach") had come to mean "humbug, a ridiculous story, deceitful talk" in Britain. In the 2010s, it became a pejorative slang term for a white, right-wing person with a flushed red face.

== See also ==
- List of smoked foods
