= Political culture of the United Kingdom =

The political culture of the United Kingdom was described by the political scientists Gabriel Almond and Sidney Verba (1963) as a deferential civic culture. In the United Kingdom, factors such as class and regionalism and the nation's history such as the legacy of the British Empire impact on political culture.

== Factors which have shaped British political culture ==
- Geography: Britain's position as an island nation
- Religion: A Christian tradition, and notably a history of confessional clashes beginning in the 16th century and continuing into the 17th, 18th, 19th and 20th century between Calvinists (e.g. Presbyterians), Anglicans, and Roman Catholics.
- History: The gradual evolution of the political system rather than revolution.
- Sociology: Britain's conversion early on, compared to neighbouring states, away from a rural and agricultural society and into an urban and industrial society.
