= Little Englander =

British term with various meanings

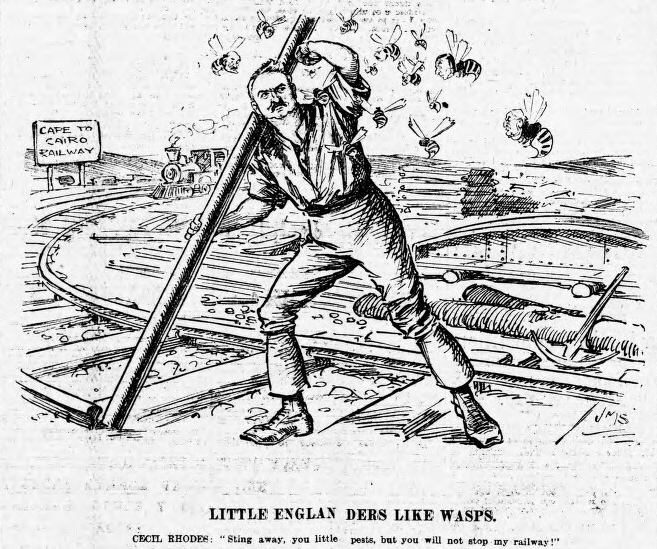
1899 cartoon by Joseph Morewood Staniforth depicting Little Englanders attacking Cecil Rhodes

The Little Englanders were a British political movement who opposed empire-building and advocated complete independence for Britain's existing colonies. The ideas of Little Englandism first began to gain popularity in the late 18th century after the loss of the American colonies, but later came to be strongly associated as a reference to members of the Liberal Party who opposed further expansion of the British Empire. The term "Little Englander" itself was first recorded in 1833, and was usually derogatory.

Since the 2010s, especially after the 2016 Brexit referendum, the term has become a popular derogatory epithet for an English nationalist who mistrusts the European Union, international cooperation, and foreigners in general. "Gammon" has been used similarly in British political culture since 2012.

== History ==
The original Little England movement originated among manufacturers in Manchester and found support among journalists such as Goldwin Smith. The movement objected to the protectionist stance of British Canada, which was exemplified by the tariff increase of 1859. The English manufacturers resented paying taxes to defend a colony that imported few British goods, but exported so many to England. Moreover, it was believed that the United States could become a much more important partner, as it was already Britain's best customer outside Europe. There was also a social element to the movement. The Manchester School opposed the Empire for providing sinecures for the idle sons of the aristocracy at the expense of productive industrialists at home. The Little England stance was adopted by a wing of the Liberal Party typified by William Gladstone (1809–1898), who opposed many of Britain's military ventures in the late 19th century. It is particularly associated with opposition to the Second Boer War (1899–1902). Arthur Ponsonby wrote of the Liberal leader Sir Henry Campbell-Bannerman's opposition to the Boer War: "The impression one got of him from the Press in those days was … that he was an unpatriotic Little Englander".

== In literature ==
The term "little England" predates its political usage; the expression "this little England" was used in the Gunpowder Day sermon of the English Puritan preacher Thomas Hooker (5 November 1626). It is also used in Shakespeare's play Henry VIII (1601), when the Old Lady tells Anne Boleyn: "In faith, for little England / You'd venture an emballing: / I myself would for Carnarvonshire."

== Contemporary usage ==
The Cambridge online dictionary defines "Little Englander" as "an English person who thinks England is better than all other countries, and that England should only work together with other countries when there is an advantage for England in doing so". The term has been used in a derogatory manner for English people who are perceived as being excessively nationalistic or xenophobic. It has also been applied to English opponents of globalism, multilateralism, and internationalism. Since the 2010s, especially post-Brexit, the term has gained popularity as a derogatory way to describe English nationalists or xenophobes. For this reason, it is similar to the insult "gammon", which has been used in British political culture since 2012.

== See also ==
- Decolonisation#British Empire
- Gammon (insult)
- Merry England
