= Parochial political culture =

A parochial political culture is a political culture where citizens have only limited awareness of the existence of central government. Parochial culture leads to the general ignorance about political subjects and a consequent lack of involvement of political activity. It may occur in regions where traditionally-stateless societies are subject to the jurisdiction of a state, their limited awareness of the law contributing to the power dynamics between such communities and their state.
