= Political culture =

Set of attitudes and beliefs that give order and meaning to a political process

Inglehart-Welzel values map

Political culture describes how culture impacts politics. Every political system is embedded in a particular political culture. Political culture is what the people, the voters, the electorates believe and do based on their understanding of the political system in which they have found themselves. These may be regarded as good or bad when compared with global best practices or norms.

== Definition ==
Gabriel Almond defines it as "the particular pattern of orientations toward political actions in which every political system is embedded".

Lucian Pye's definition is that "Political culture is the set of attitudes, beliefs, and sentiments, which give order and meaning to a political process and which provide the underlying assumptions and rules that govern behavior in the political system".

María Eugenia Vázquez Semadeni defines political culture as "the set of discourses and symbolic practices by means of which both individuals and groups articulate their relationship to power, elaborate their political demands and put them at stake."

== Analysis ==
The limits of a particular political culture are based on subjective identity. The most common form of such identity today is the national identity, and hence nation states set the typical limits of political cultures. The sociocultural system, in turn, gives meaning to a political culture through shared symbols and rituals (such as a national independence day) which reflect common values. This may develop into a civil religion. The values themselves can be more hierarchical or egalitarian, and will set the limits to political participation, thereby creating a basis for legitimacy. They are transmitted through socialization, and shaped by shared historical experiences which form the collective or national memory. Intellectuals will continue to interpret the political culture through political discourse in the public sphere. Indeed, elite political culture is more consequential than mass-level.

=== Elements ===
Trust is a major factor in political culture, as its level determines the state's capacity to function. Postmaterialism is the degree to which political culture is concerned with issues which are not of immediate physical or material concern, such as human rights and environmentalism. Religion has also an impact on political culture.

== Classifications ==
Different typologies of political culture have been proposed.

=== Almond and Verba ===
Gabriel Almond and Sidney Verba in The Civic Culture outlined three pure types of political culture based on level and type of political participation and the nature of people's attitudes toward politics:

- Parochial – Where citizens are only remotely aware of the presence of central government, and live their lives near enough regardless of the decisions taken by the state, distant and unaware of political phenomena. They have neither knowledge nor interest in politics. This type of political culture is generally congruent with a traditional political structure.
- Subject – Where citizens are aware of central government, and are heavily subjected to its decisions with little scope for dissent. The individual is aware of politics, its actors, and institutions. It is effectively oriented towards politics, yet it is on the "downward flow" side of politics. In general, it is congruent with a centralized authoritarian structure.
- Participant – Citizens can influence the government in various ways, and they are affected by it. The individual is oriented toward the system as a whole, to both the political and administrative structures and processes (to both the input and output aspects). In general, it is congruent with a democratic political structure.

Almond and Verba wrote that these types of political culture can combine to create the civic culture, which mixes the best elements of each.

=== Elazar ===
Daniel J. Elazar identified three kinds of political culture:

- Individualistic culture – In which politics is a marketplace between individuals seeking to maximize their self-interest, with minimal community involvement and opposition to the government, as well as a high degree of patronage. See also: Neopatrimonialism.
- Moralistic culture – Whereby government is seen as important and as a way to improve people's lives.
- Traditionalistic culture – One which seeks to preserve the status quo under which elites have all the power and citizen participation is not expected.

=== Huntington ===
Samuel P. Huntington classified political cultures according to civilizations on the basis of geography and history:

- Western civilization
- Japanese civilization
- Islamic civilization
- Hindu civilization
- Slavic-Orthodox civilization
- Latin American civilization
- Chinese civilization
- African civilization

=== Inglehart ===
Ronald Inglehart proposes that political culture can dictate political systems, and points out a correlation between Protestantism (or more generally societies with high Secular-Rational values and high Self Expression values on the Inglehart-Weltzel values map) and stable democratization. However, the recurrent post-elections clashes in largely protestant Sub-Saharan countries, such as Kenya or Uganda, shows that religious affiliations seem to affect the political behaviour of populations poorly.

== National political cultures ==
=== Russia ===
Russia is a low-trust society, with even the highest trusted institutions of church and the military having more distrustful than trusting citizens, and with low participation in civil society. This means that Russia has a weak civic political culture. Furthermore, the authoritarian traditions of Russia mean that there is little support for democratic norms such as tolerance of dissent and pluralism. Russia has a history of authoritarian rulers from Ivan the Terrible to Joseph Stalin, who have engaged in massive repression of all potential political competitors, from the oprichnina to the Great Purge. The resulting political systems of Tsarist autocracy and Soviet communism had no space for independent institutions.

=== United States ===
The background of its early immigrants heavily influenced the political culture of the United States, as it is a settler society. Samuel P. Huntington identified American politics as having a "Tudor" character, with elements of English political culture of that period, such as common law, strong courts, local self-rule, decentralized sovereignty across institutions, and reliance on popular militias instead of a standing army, having been imported by early settlers. Another source of political culture was the arrival of Scotch-Irish Americans, who came from a violent region of the United Kingdom, and brought with them a strong sense of individualism and support for the right to bear arms. These settlers provided the support for Jacksonian democracy, which was a revolution of its time against the established elites, and remnants of which can still be seen in modern American populism.

=== China ===
The political culture of China is tied closely to political socialization, as children are indoctrinated into the collectivist perspective of the Chinese Communist Party. This inculcation is theorized to explain the delayed growth of secularism in Chinese culture, especially during the Cultural Revolution. Chinese political culture perceives the relationship between government and individuals to be a hierarchy. Because of this, there is little pushback from individuals during policy and regulation changes. The political culture also shows a trend against confrontationality, which decreases the quantity and frequency of social conflict. Both of these qualities stem from traditional Chinese values embedded during the age of Confucianism. When the Chinese Communist Party took power in 1948, Mao Zedong unsuccessfully attempted to remove these traits from the culture, instead prioritizing revolutionary values.

=== India ===
Due to India's colonization by the British Empire, the contemporary political culture has been influenced by Western ideas that were not present before, so we also follow Western political culture. These influences include democracy and parliamentary systems, two institutions that stood ideologically opposed to the caste system that had previously dictated society. Because of India's multicultural demography, the political culture varies by group and region. India's successful democratization lead to power being given to both the urbanized and well-educated class who focused on national appeal, as well as more traditional, rural, and lower class political actors. In the modern era, the class system of India has begun to break down, and members of lower classes are now entering higher political and economic positions. This is especially true for lower-class women, who historically have been excluded from such activities.

== See also ==
- Political culture of Canada
- Political culture of Germany
- Politics of Northern Ireland
- Political culture of the United Kingdom
- Political culture of the United States
