= Lobbying in Germany =

Lobbying in Germany, as in many other parliamentary democracies, plays a significant role in the development of legislation. Lobbying has existed in Germany since 1956, when the Federal Constitutional Court (German: Bundesverfassungsgericht) issued a ruling legalizing it. A mandatory lobby register (German: Lobbyliste) was introduced in Germany effective 1 January 2022, along with a code of conduct.

== Background ==
Members of the German parliament, or Bundestag have a free and independent mandate guaranteed in §38 of the German Basic Law: they are able to vote according to their conscience at any time, even over the wishes of their party or voters. This mandate allows room for outside influence from special interest groups.

As early as 1956, the Federal Constitutional Court ruled that lobbying was legal, stating that "there can be no doubt that extra-parliamentary actions of various kinds are conceivable which may serve to legitimately influence Parliament, especially insofar as they are intended to inform Members of Parliament of the opinions held by the electorate on certain political issues. In itself, therefore, there is no constitutional objection to 'interest groups' seeking to influence Members of Parliament; even mass actions by labor are not in principle impermissible."

In 1994, Germany criminalized bribery of a member of parliament under §108(e) of the German Criminal Code. In 1972, the Bundestag made bribery a violation of its honor code, but this did not include criminal penalties.

== Criticism ==
A frequent criticism of lobbying in Germany, particularly in the context of nuclear and solar power, biotechnology, copyright/file sharing, software patents or consumer protection laws, is that the interests of industry and large corporations are promoted through extensive lobbying work at the national or EU level, to the detriment of smaller companies and the general public. This accusation has also been applied to environmental organizations, trade unions, social interest groups, and churches, all of which claim that their particular interests represent the public interest. In Germany, the pharmaceutical and energy industries are considered to have a particularly strong lobbying influence as well. The former president of the Federal Constitutional Court Hans-Jürgen Papier warned that a level playing field does not exist between various special interest groups and that weaker interests are not taken into account.

Raimund Kamm, former member of Alliance 90/The Greens, described the situation:

Sobald jemand zum Abgeordneten oder dann auch zum Minister gewählt wird, ändern sich fundamental seine Kommunikation und seine Gesprächspartner. Auch ‚Arbeitervertreter‘ oder Grüne werden dann von IHK, Unternehmern und anderen einseitig Interessierten eingeladen und hofiert. Ein immer größerer Teil der Gespräche von gewählten Politikern erfolgt mit professionellen Lobbyvertretern. Dies schmeichelt auch dem jungen, unerfahrenen Volksvertreter.

As soon as someone is elected as a member of parliament or as a minister, his communication and his interlocutors fundamentally change. Even 'labor representatives' or Greens are then invited and courted by a chamber of commerce and industry, entrepreneurs and other unilaterally interested parties. An increasingly large proportion of elected politicians' talks are with professional lobby representatives. This also flatters the young, inexperienced elected representative.

— Raimund Kamm

Educational materials provided by lobbying groups to schools for economic education have also been criticized as "scientifically and politically tendentious."

== Lobbyliste ==
In 1972, the President of the Bundestag became responsible for maintaining the voluntary Public Listing of Lobby Groups and their Representatives, known as the "Lobbyliste". The number of entries has fluctuated: in June 2010, there were 2,136 groups registered; in July 2012, there were 2,079; in December 2014, 2,221. Due to the list's voluntary membership and the narrow definition of "interest group," the list did not fully cover the spectrum of lobbying in Parliament. In the 16th session of the Bundestag (2005–2009), there were several parliamentary initiatives aimed at improving the transparency of lobbying in politics. In their 2009 party platforms, the SPD, Green Party, and Die Linke called for the establishment of a mandatory lobby register. Of the 2,221 lobbyists on the list at the end of 2014, 575 had received an access badge to German parliamentary offices. More badges were also issued by parliamentary leaders to an unknown number of lobbyists in a process that had previously been kept secret. In 2015, following legal proceedings, the Federal Government was forced to disclose the names of the lobbyists who had received access badges with the help of party factions: 1,111 representatives of interest groups, corporations, law firms, and other agencies were disclosed. In February 2016, the Council of Elders of the Bundestag agreed to stop the issuance of access badges to lobbyists. For perspective, In 2017, the number of lobbyists with a Bundestag access badge eclipsed the number of members of parliament who had one: there were 706 lobbyists with an access badge and only 630 members of parliament with one.

According to a rough estimate, there are 5,000 lobbyists in Berlin, eight times the number of members of the Bundestag. According to Bürgerbewegung Finanzwende, an organization calling for reforms of the financial services industry, the finance sector employs over 1,500 lobbyists with an annual budget of 200 million euros. Former President of the Bundestag Norbert Lammert also warned of the sector's considerable and growing influence.

== Recent developments ==
In 2006, a particular type of lobbyist (described by Hans Herbert von Arnim as "in the orbit of corruption") came to light: external employees of federal ministries who remained in the employ of the private sector, trade associations or interest groups. In a statement, the Federal Government denied that these lobbyists exerted any political influence on the decision-making process.

The energy sector, and in particular the four large German energy companies (RWE, E.ON, EnBW and Vattenfall), was initially forced to accept the 2000 agreement to phase out nuclear power. After this agreement, the industry sought to use its lobbyist groups, such as Deutsches Atomforum (DAtF) and the Kerntechnische Gesellschaft (KTG), along with political allies, to revise the "nuclear consensus." The nuclear energy lobby sought to change public opinion in advance of the 2009 German Federal Election; in autumn of 2010, after an extensive media campaign, the Second Merkel Cabinet passed a phase-out extension to existing German nuclear plants. Since March 2011, the nuclear lobby has sought to delay or reverse the second nuclear phase-out.

Reports in 2017 attributed both the Cum-Ex and Dieselgate scandals to the influence of lobbyists. Activists from LobbyControl attributed the scandals to the Third Merkel cabinet's failure to implement binding rules on lobbyists.

Following the insolvency of Wirecard in 2020, reports emerged that former high-ranking CDU politicians had engaged in lobbying work for the company, including the former Federal Minister of Defense, Karl-Theodor zu Guttenberg.

A mandatory lobby register came into force in Germany on January 1, 2022, along with a code of conduct. These were implemented by the Fourth Merkel Cabinet. The scope of the register and code of conduct were widely criticized as insufficient, both by the opposition parties and the Council of Europe's anti-corruption monitoring body.
