= Political culture of Germany =

The political culture of Germany as of the early 21st century is known for the popular expectation for governments to ensure a degree of social welfare, business and labour corporatism, and a multi-party system dominated by conservative and social democratic forces, with a strong influence of smaller green, liberal and socialist parties. Coalition governments are predominant on both the federal and the state levels, exemplifying the German desire for consensus politics over one party majority rule as in democracies that follow the Westminster model. Although this consensus culture is beneficial insofar as it enables minority groups to take part in political discussions and decision making, it often leads to situations in which different interest groups blockade each other resulting in political gridlocks. Political decision-making is further complicated by the powers held by the German states and the presence of a judicial branch with the power to review and dismiss legislation. Therefore, political power in Germany is not concentrated in the hands of one or a small number of individuals but spread thinly. Even the Chancellor can only set general guidelines for federal policies (Richtlinienkompetenz) and has to negotiate with many other politicians and interest groups when there is a need to take concrete measures.
