= The Civic Culture =

1963 book by Gabriel Almond and Sidney Verba

- Cover of the 1963 edition
- Author: Gabriel Almond, Sidney Verba
- Publisher: Sage Publications, Inc
- English publication date: December 1963
- Media type: Print
- Pages: 574 ppg (1963 release)
- ISBN: 0691075034 (1963 release); ISBN 0803935587 (1989 release)

The Civic Culture or The Civic Culture: Political Attitudes and Democracy in Five Nations is a 1963 political science book by Gabriel Almond and Sidney Verba. The book is credited with popularizing the political culture sub-field and is considered to be the first systematic study in this field.

== Synopsis ==
In the text Almond and Verba examine the democratic systems in five countries, the United States, Germany, Mexico, Italy, and the United Kingdom. They interviewed about a thousand individuals in each country on their views of government and political life. As they define it, the "civic culture" (singular) is "based on communication and persuasion, a culture of consensus and diversity, a culture that [permits] change but [moderates] it" (Almond and Verba 1963, 8). They consider political culture to be the element that connects individual attitudes with the overall political system structure.

They identify three political structures: participant, subject, and parochial.

- Parochial cultures exemplified by tribal societies have little or no specialized political roles and low expectations for political change. Members conceive of their political role in familistic terms, thinking of their family's advantage as the main goal to pursue. Members have low affective and evaluative orientation within the political system.
- Subject cultures have citizens with high cognitive, affective and evaluative orientation towards the political system and policy outputs, but have a relatively detached passive relationship towards them, with minimal to no relationship to political groups or being an active participant. Subject cultures are most compatible with authoritarian political structures.
- Participant cultures have citizens who regard law not as simply something to passively obey, but something they help shape. Members have high cognitive, affective and evaluative orientation to all four types of objects within the political system.

Strong civic cultures are distinguished by robust support for achieving political homeostasis: the optimal mediated balance between multiple contradictory forces such as in the tension between respect for individual rights and concern for the public good, or that between governmental effectiveness and responsiveness to the interests of citizens.

Almond and Verba considered the Italian emphasis on the family as the driving main force for society as "amoral" (in the words of Edward Banfield (The Moral Basis of a Backward Society, 1958), or "exclusive", and believed that such a culture would impede the culture's potential for developing a "sense of community and civic culture," which they saw as a necessary background for "effective democracy".

== Reception ==
Seymour Lipset wrote in The Democratic Century that Almond and Verba, "did argue persuasively that the extent of civic culture could be predicted by structural and historical factors" but that there was also "strong evidence that some aspects of the civic culture were powerfully associated with education levels, across national borders".

The Civic Culture was criticized for having an "Anglo-American bias", with the authors stating that only the United Kingdom and the United States possessed the capability for long term democratic stabilization. Critics also expressed skepticism over the accuracy of depicting a culture based upon individual interviews and that the approach was "ethnocentric and more prescriptive than objective and empirical". Verba agrees that there is much to the criticism of putting cultures into the same mould, paying too little attention to context and institutional structures in other countries.

In a retrospective in 2015, Verba offered some additional criticisms of his work, the most important of which was its mistaken optimism about education’s impact on civic culture. His assumption, which has been disproved in the last 50 years, was that a more highly-educated population would create a more secular and rational world. This change would significantly reduce clashes based on religious, racial and ethnic differences. Numerous other studies had replicated his other findings, but Verba pointed out that his data collection and analysis were primitive compared to what is typical in similar studies today. This criticism applied not just to technology but also to methodology such as care in crafting comparable questions in various languages.
