= Gabriel Almond =

American political scientist (1911–2002)

- Born: Gabriel Abraham Almond; January 12, 1911; Rock Island, Illinois, US
- Died: December 25, 2002 (aged 91); Pacific Grove, California, US
- Awards: Karl Deutsch Award (1997)

Academic background
- Education: University of Chicago
- Thesis: Plutocracy and Politics in New York City

Academic work
- Discipline: Political science
- Sub-discipline: Comparative politics
- Institutions: Brooklyn College; US Office of War Information; US Strategic Bombing Survey; Yale University; Princeton University; Stanford University
- Notable works: The Civic Culture (1963)

Gabriel Abraham Almond (January 12, 1911 – December 25, 2002) was an American political scientist best known for his pioneering work on comparative politics, political development, and political culture.

== Biography ==
Almond was born on January 12, 1911, in Rock Island, Illinois, the son of Russian-Jewish and Ukrainian-Jewish immigrants, raised "in a strict orthodox Jewish home." He attended the University of Chicago, both as an undergraduate and as a graduate student, and worked with Harold Lasswell. Almond completed his Doctor of Philosophy degree in 1938, but his doctoral dissertation, Plutocracy and Politics in New York City, was not published until 1998, because it included unflattering references to John D. Rockefeller, a benefactor of the University of Chicago.

Almond taught at Brooklyn College (now the City University of New York) from 1939 to 1942. With US entry into World War II, Almond joined the Office of War Information, analyzing enemy propaganda, and becoming head of its Enemy Information Section. After the war, Almond worked for the US Strategic Bombing Survey in post-war Germany.

Almond returned to academic life in 1947 and taught at Yale University where he was part of their Institute of International Studies until 1951, when he was part of a group that left for Princeton University and founded its Center of International Studies. He subsequently returned to Yale in 1959, then went to Stanford University in 1963, where he remained until his retirement in 1993. He was elected a Fellow of the American Academy of Arts and Sciences in 1961 and the American Philosophical Society in 1966. He was chair of the political science department at Stanford from 1964 to 1969 and spent time as a visiting professor at the University of Tokyo, the University of Belo Horizonte, and the Taras Shevchenko National University of Kyiv. Although Almond retired in 1976 and became an emeritus professor at Stanford, he continued to write and teach until his death.

Almond chaired the Social Science Research Council's Committee on Comparative Politics for many years and was president of the American Political Science Association (APSA) for 1965–1966. In 1981, he received APSA's James Madison Award, which is given to a political scientist who has made a "distinguished scholarly contribution" during his or her career. He was also the first recipient of the Karl Deutsch Award of the International Political Science Association in 1997. Almond died on December 25, 2002, in Pacific Grove, California, aged 91.

== Research ==
Almond broadened the political science field in the 1950s by integrating approaches from other social science disciplines, such as sociology, psychology, and anthropology, into his work. He transformed an interest in foreign policy into systematic studies of comparative political development and culture. Almond's research eventually covered many topics, including the politics of developing countries, communism, and religious fundamentalism.

Almond was a prolific author, publishing 18 books and numerous journal articles, and co-writing many others. His most famous work was The Civic Culture (1963), co-authored with Sidney Verba. It popularized the idea of a political culture – a concept that includes national character and how people choose to govern themselves – as a fundamental aspect of society. Almond and Verba distinguished different political cultures according to their level and type of political participation and the nature of people's attitudes toward politics. The Civic Culture was one of the first large-scale cross-national survey studies undertaken in political science and greatly stimulated comparative studies of democracy.

Almond also contributed to theoretical work on political development. In Comparative Politics: A Developmental Approach (1966), Almond and G. Bingham Powell proposed a variety of cultural and functional ways to measure the development of societies. For a period in the 1960s and 1970s, Almond's approaches came to define comparative politics.

In a 1991 paper titled, "Capitalism and Democracy", in two paragraphs Almond stated what the basic agendas for the study of governance ought to be in US universities: that capitalism and democracy co-exist as the prevailing systems of governance the world over and they invariably interact with each other and transform each other through time."

== Almond–Lippmann consensus ==
The similarities between Almond's view and Walter Lippmann's produced what became known as the Almond–Lippmann consensus, which is based on three assumptions:

1. Public opinion is volatile, shifting erratically in response to the most recent developments or manipulation. Mass beliefs early in the twentieth century were "too pacifist in peace and too bellicose in war, too neutralist or appeasing in negotiations or too intransigent."
2. Public opinion is incoherent, lacking an organized or a consistent structure to such an extent that the views of US citizens could best be described as "nonattitudes".
3. Public opinion is irrelevant to the policy-making process. Political leaders ignore public opinion because most Americans can neither "understand nor influence the very events upon which their lives and happiness are known to depend."

The Almond–Lippmann consensus was highly influential in the 1950s and 1960s but weakened following the Vietnam War. Current research has refuted much of the Almond–Lippmann consensus, especially the second point that public opinion is incoherent and lacks organization. In fact, research done by the University of Pittsburgh and the University of Kentucky has suggested that Americans reach opinion on foreign policy by using abstract, but often consistent, ideologies. These ideologies include their attitudes towards communism, militarism, isolationism, and so forth.

Lippmann recanted his previous view, arguing that the public had taken a more sober approach to the war than the heads of government.

== Bibliography ==
- Almond, Gabriel A., and Harold D. Lasswell. 1934. "Aggressive Behavior by Clients Toward Public Relief Administrators: A Configurative Analysis." American Political Science Review 28(4): 643–655.
- Almond, Gabriel Abraham. "Plutocracy in Politics in New York City" (PhD dissertation, University of Chicago ProQuest Dissertations Publishing, 1938. T-00324).
- Almond, Gabriel A. "The Political Attitudes of Wealth" Journal of Politics (1945) 7#3 pp. 213–255 online
- Almond, Gabriel A. 1950. The American People and Foreign Policy. Harcourt, Brace.
- Almond, Gabriel A. 1954. The Appeals of Communism. Princeton, N.J.: Princeton University Press.
- Almond, Gabriel A. 1956. “Comparative Political Systems.” Journal of Politics 18(3): 391-409.
- Almond, Gabriel A. and James S. Coleman. (eds.). 1960. The Politics of the Developing Areas. Princeton, N.J.: Princeton University Press.
- Almond, Gabriel A., and Sidney Verba. 1963. The Civic Culture: Political Attitudes and Democracy in Five Nations. Princeton, NJ: Princeton University Press.
- Almond, Gabriel A. 1965. “A Developmental Approach to Political Systems.” World Politics 17(2): 183-214.
- Almond, Gabriel A. 1966. "Political Theory and Political Science." American Political Science Review 60(4): 869–879.
- Almond, Gabriel A., and G. Bingham Powell, Jr. 1966. Comparative Politics: A Developmental Approach. Boston: Little, Brown and Co.
- Almond, Gabriel A. 1968. “Politics, Comparative,” pp. 331–36, in David L. Sills (ed.), International Encyclopaedia of the Social Sciences Vol. 12. New York: Macmillan
- Almond, Gabriel A., Scott C. Flanagan and Robert J. Mundt. (eds.). 1973. Crisis, Choice, and Change: Historical Studies of Political Development. Boston: Little, Brown and Co.
- Almond, Gabriel A. (ed.). 1974. Comparative Politics Today: A World View.Little, Brown.
- Almond, Gabriel A., and Sidney Verba (eds.). 1980. The Civic Culture Revisited. Little, Brown.
- Almond, Gabriel A. 1988. "The Return to the State." American Political Science Review 82(3): 853–874.
- Almond, Gabriel A. 1990. A Discipline Divided. Schools and Sects in Political Science. Newbury Park, Cal.: Sage Publications.
- Almond, Gabriel A., R. Scott Appleby, and Emmanuel Sivan. 2003. Strong Religion: The Rise of Fundamentalisms Around the World. University of Chicago Press.
- Almond, Gabriel A. 2002. Ventures in Political Science: Narratives and Reflections. Boulder, Col.: Lynne Rienner.

Professional and academic associations
Preceded by David Truman	President of the American Political Science Association; 1965–1966	Succeeded by Robert A. Dahl
Awards
Preceded by Robert A. Dahl	APSA James Madison Award; 1981	Succeeded by Herbert A. Simon
New award	Karl Deutsch Award; 1997	Succeeded by Jean Laponce
