= List of University of Alabama people =

The following is a list of notable people associated with the University of Alabama, located in the American city of Tuscaloosa, Alabama.

== Notable alumni ==
=== Arts and humanities ===
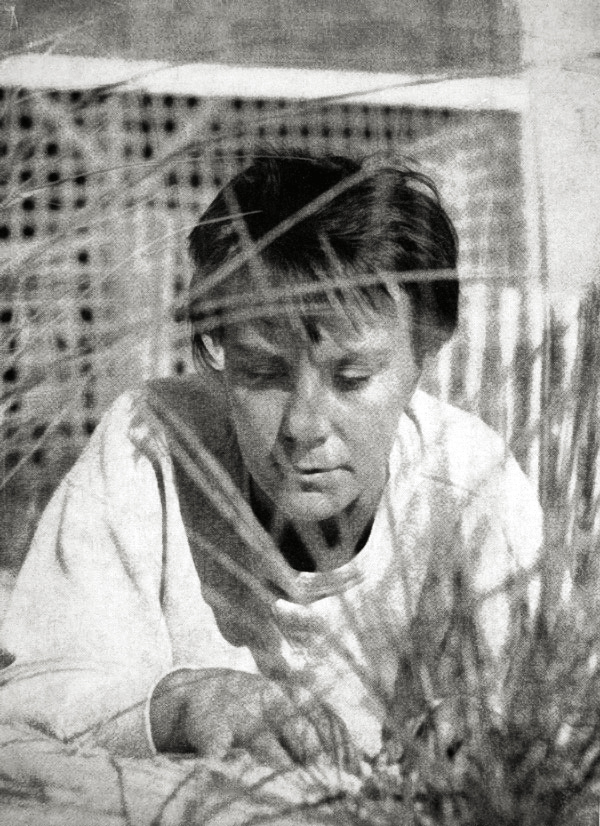
Harper Lee

- Mark Childress, author who wrote the screenplay for Crazy in Alabama and the novel of the same name
- William Christenberry, photographer, painter, sculptor, and teacher
- Jean Cox, opera singer
- Kevin Crawford, scholar of William Shakespeare and Thomas Middleton
- Done P. Dabale, bishop and founder of the United Methodist Church in Nigeria
- Borden Deal, novelist and short story writer
- Blanche Evans Dean, naturalist, conservationist, and schoolteacher
- Tim Earley, poet
- John Martin Finlay, poet and writer
- Winston Groom, author best known for his novel Forrest Gump, which became a cultural phenomenon after being adapted into a film of the same name
- Sigmund Hecht, rabbi who received a Doctorate of Divinity from UA in 1886
- Jim Hilgartner, author of poetry and fiction
- Honorée Fanonne Jeffers, poet and novelist
- May Hyman Lesser, artist and medical illustrator
- Dale Kennington, contemporary artist
- Grey Wolfe LaJoie, writer and O. Henry Award recipient
- Tanner Latham, writer and podcaster
- Harper Lee, author best known for her novel To Kill a Mockingbird, which won the Pulitzer Prize
- Everette Maddox, poet
- Michelle Richmond, author best known for her novel The Year of Fog, which was a New York Times Best Seller
- K. Lee Scott, teacher, musician, conductor, and composer
- Annette Shelby, academic
- Kathryn Stockett, author best known for her novel The Help, which was adapted into a film of the same name
- Ann Waldron, author

=== Business ===
- Winton M. Blount, entrepreneur who founded and served as CEO of Blount International; former postmaster general
- Samuel DiPiazza, business executive who served as chairman of Warner Bros. Discovery; former CEO of PricewaterhouseCoopers
- James M. Fail, financial executive who served as chairman of Stone Holdings and Bluebonnet Savings Bank
- Julie Gao, attorney and business executive who serves as CFO of ByteDance
- Janet Gurwitch, entrepreneur who founded Gurwitch Products, the manufacturer of Laura Mercier Cosmetics
- Marillyn Hewson, businesswoman who served as chairman, president, and CEO of Lockheed Martin
- Vicki Hollub, businesswoman who served as president and CEO of Occidental Petroleum; the first woman to head a major American oil company
- Bernie Madoff, financier and convicted fraudster who ran the world's largest Ponzi scheme; attended UA for his freshman year, then transferred to and subsequently graduated from Hofstra University
- Benjamin C. Russell, entrepreneur who created the sweatshirt and served as president of Russell Manufacturing Co.
- Lowell C. Smith, academic administrator who served as president of Nichols College

=== Entertainment ===
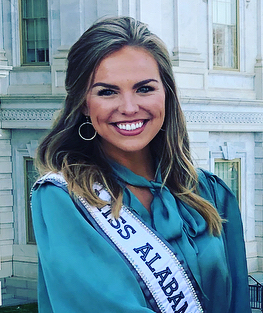
Hannah Brown

- Hannah Brown, Miss Alabama USA 2018; contestant on The Bachelor; star of The Bachelorette
- Norbert Leo Butz, actor and singer known for his work in Broadway theatre; two-time winner of the Tony Award for Best Actor in a Musical
- Caleb Castille, actor known for NCIS: Los Angeles, Wu-Tang: An American Saga, and Woodlawn
- Tom Cherones, TV producer and director known for Seinfeld, NewsRadio, and Desperate Housewives
- Ashley Crow, actress known for the TV series Heroes
- Kylan Darnell, internet personality and Miss Ohio Teen USA 2022
- Michael Emerson, actor known for the TV series The Practice, Lost, Arrow, and Person of Interest
- Brittny Gastineau, model, socialite, and reality TV personality
- Michael Luwoye, actor known for playing the title role in the Broadway musical Hamilton
- Scott Mactavish, filmmaker and author
- Debra Marshall, professional wrestler with World Wrestling Entertainment
- Sonequa Martin-Green, actress known for the TV series Star Trek: Discovery and The Walking Dead
- Madeline Mitchell, Miss Tuscaloosa and Miss Alabama USA 2011; 2nd runner-up at the Miss USA pageant
- Anastasia Muñoz, voice actress affiliated with Funimation
- Jim Nabors, actor, singer, and comedian known for The Andy Griffith Show
- India Ramey, singer-songwriter and alt-country musician
- Ray Reach, musician named one of "30 Alabamians who changed jazz history"
- Steve Sample Sr., jazz musician and educator
- Destin Sandlin, YouTube personality and educator
- Grant Sikes, internet personality
- Noelia Voigt, model and Miss USA 2023
- Sela Ward, actress known for the TV series Sisters
- Stephen Tyrone Williams, actor known for Da Sweet Blood of Jesus
- Christopher Woodrow, Hollywood movie producer known for Birdman, Black Mass, and Hacksaw Ridge

=== Politics and government ===
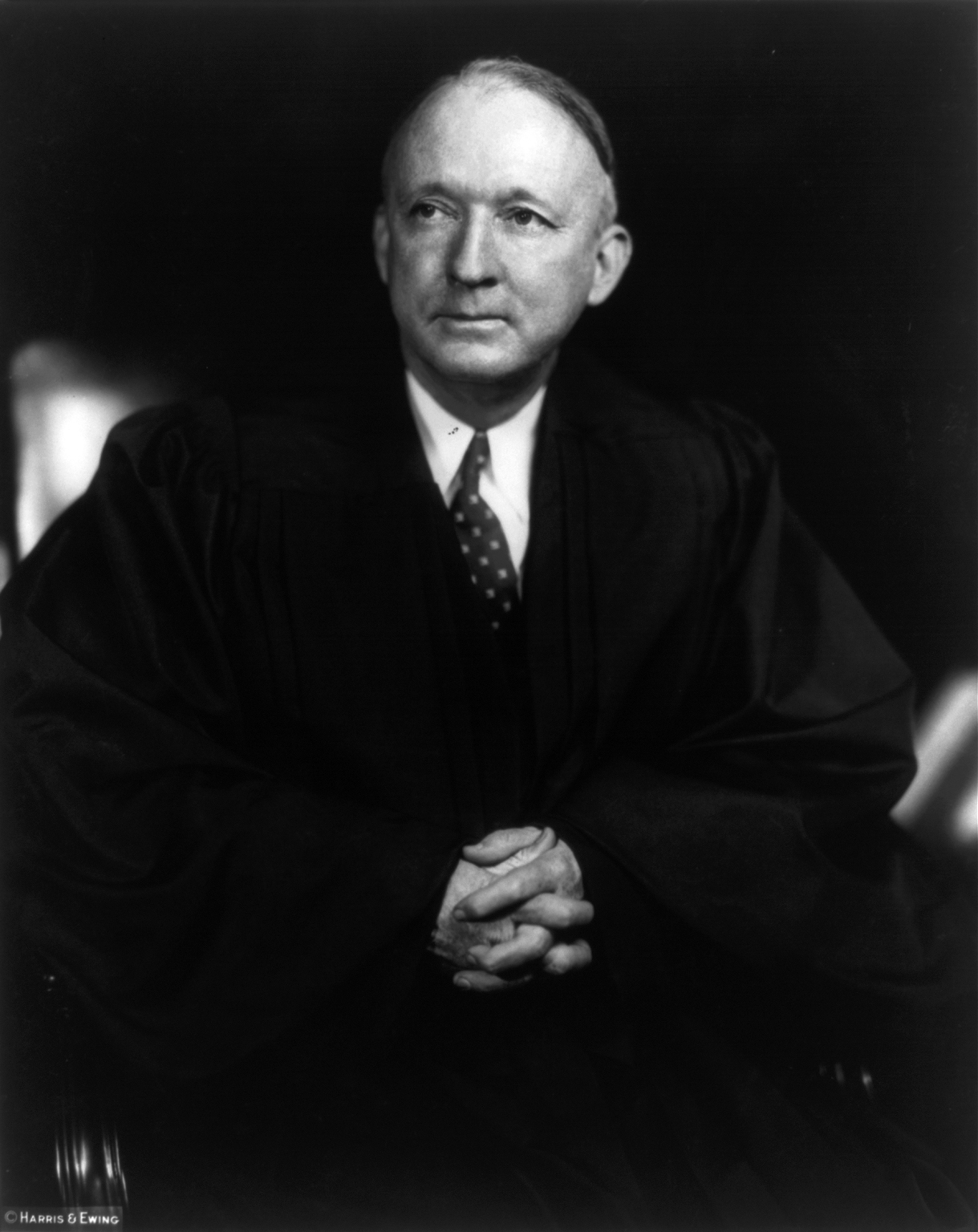
Hugo Black

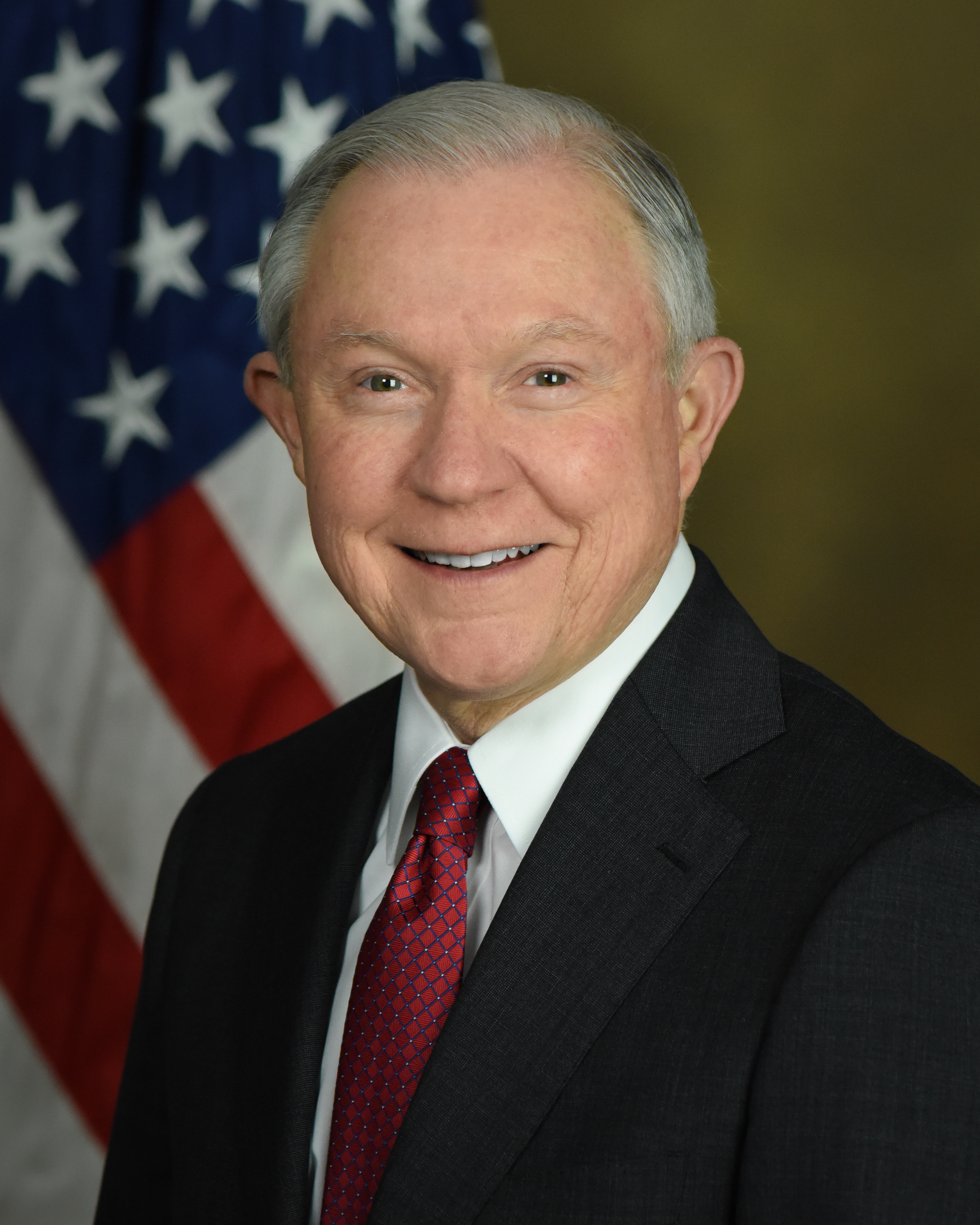
Jeff Sessions

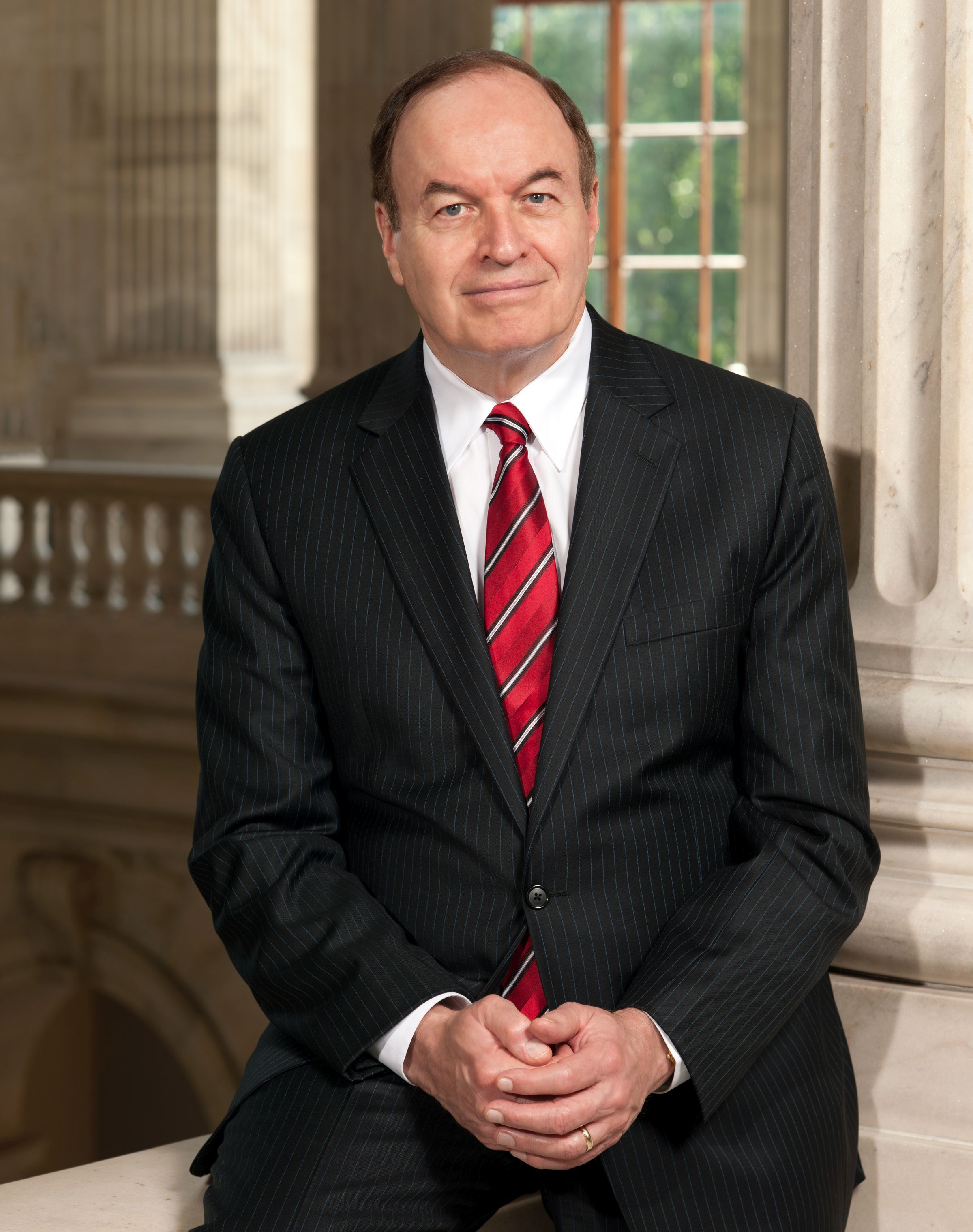
Richard Shelby

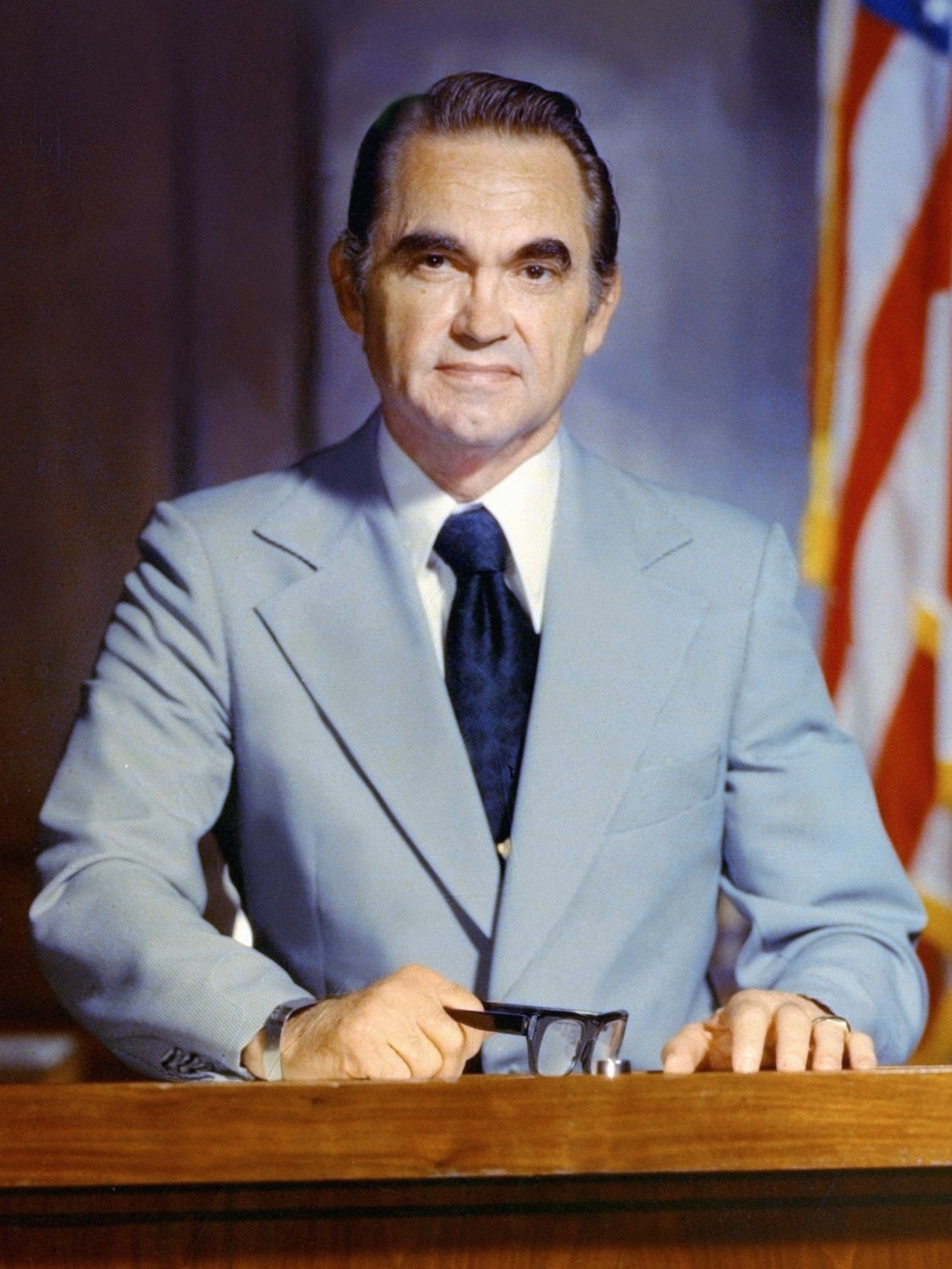
George Wallace

- John W. Abercrombie, president of UA (1902–1911) and U.S. congressman from Alabama (1913–1917)
- James B. Allen, U.S. senator from Alabama (1969–1978)
- Maryon P. Allen, U.S. senator from Alabama (1978); wife of James B. Allen
- Wes Allen, secretary of state of Alabama (2023–present)
- George W. Andrews, U.S. congressman for the 3rd District of Alabama
- Herschel W. Arant, dean of the Ohio State University Moritz College of Law and judge of the U.S. Court of Appeals
- William Brockman Bankhead, U.S. congressman (1917–1933) and (1933–1940), speaker of the House (1936–1940)
- Cynthia Bathurst, animal welfare advocate; founder and director of Safe Humane Chicago
- Bill Baxley, lieutenant governor of Alabama (1983–1987)
- Ann Bedsole, first Republican woman to serve in the Alabama House of Representatives (1979–83) and first woman to serve in the Alabama State Senate (1983–95)
- Robert J. Bentley, governor of Alabama (2011–2017)
- Tom Bevill, U.S. Congressman for the 4th District of Alabama (1967–1997)
- Hugo Black, U.S. senator from Alabama (1927–1937) and associate justice of the U.S. Supreme Court (1937–1971)
- Ron Bolton, member of the Alabama House of Representatives (2022–present)
- Katie Britt, U.S. senator from Alabama (2023–present)
- H. L. Sonny Callahan, U.S congressman from Alabama's 1st district (1985–2003)
- Henry De Lamar Clayton Jr., U.S. congressman
- Brock Colvin, member of the Alabama House of Representatives
- Margaret Conditt, Ohio state representative
- George Henry Craig, U.S. congressman for the 4th District of Alabama
- Alexander C. Davidson, U.S. congressman for the 4th District of Alabama
- Morris Dees, civil rights attorney; founder of the Southern Poverty Law Center
- Eric Dick, property insurance attorney; president of the Harris County Department of Education (2017–present)
- Carl Elliott, U.S. congressman from Alabama's 7th district (1949–1965)
- Jim Folsom, governor of Alabama (1947–1951) and (1955–1959)
- Millard Fuller, founder of Habitat for Humanity International
- Charles Graddick, attorney general of Alabama (1979–1987)
- Junius Foy Guin Jr., judge for the U.S. District Court for the Northern District of Alabama
- Lino Gutierrez, diplomat who served as U.S. ambassador to Nicaragua (1996–1999) and U.S. ambassador to Argentina (2003–2006)
- Howell Heflin, U.S. senator from Alabama (1979–1997)
- Ralph Anthony Howard, member of the Alabama House of Representatives
- Frank Minis Johnson Jr., federal judge whose opinions were critical to the Civil Rights Movement
- Doug Jones, U.S. senator from Alabama
- Vivian Malone Jones, first African-American graduate of UA
- Maud McLure Kelly, first woman to practice law in Alabama
- Stephanie Kopelousos, former secretary of the Florida Department of Transportation (2007–2011)
- Bill Lamb, member of the Alabama House of Representatives (2022–present)
- Andrew L. Lewis, retired admiral in the U.S. Navy who last served as the commander of the Second Fleet and NATO Joint Force Command for the Atlantic
- Autherine Lucy, first African-American student to be admitted to UA after winning in Lucy v. Adams
- Champ Lyons, justice of the Supreme Court of Alabama (1998–2011)
- Daniel T. McCall Jr., justice of the Supreme Court of Alabama (1969–1975)
- Daniel McCook Jr., Union major general during the American Civil War
- Edgar L. McGowan, commissioner of South Carolina Department of Labor (1971–1989)
- Roy Moore, former chief justice of the Supreme Court of Alabama
- John Malcolm Patterson, governor of Alabama (1959–1963)
- Bob Riley, governor of Alabama (2003–2011)
- Jeff Sessions, attorney general from Alabama (1997–2017) and U.S. attorney general (2017–2018)
- Richard Shelby, U.S. senator from Alabama (1987–2023)
- Don Siegelman, governor of Alabama (1999–2003)
- Donald W. Stewart, U.S. senator from Alabama (1979–1981)
- Troy Stubbs, member of the Alabama House of Representatives (2022–present)
- Ira B. Thompson, Alabama state representative
- Curtis Travis, member of the Alabama House of Representatives
- Robert Smith Vance, judge for the U.S. Court of Appeals; chaired and de-segregated Alabama Democratic Party
- Michael G. Vickers, defense official who served as the under secretary of defense for intelligence (2011–2015)
- George Wallace, governor of Alabama (1963–1967, 1971–1979, and 1983–1987)
- Travis Weaver, member of the Illinois House of Representatives (2023–present)

=== Journalism ===
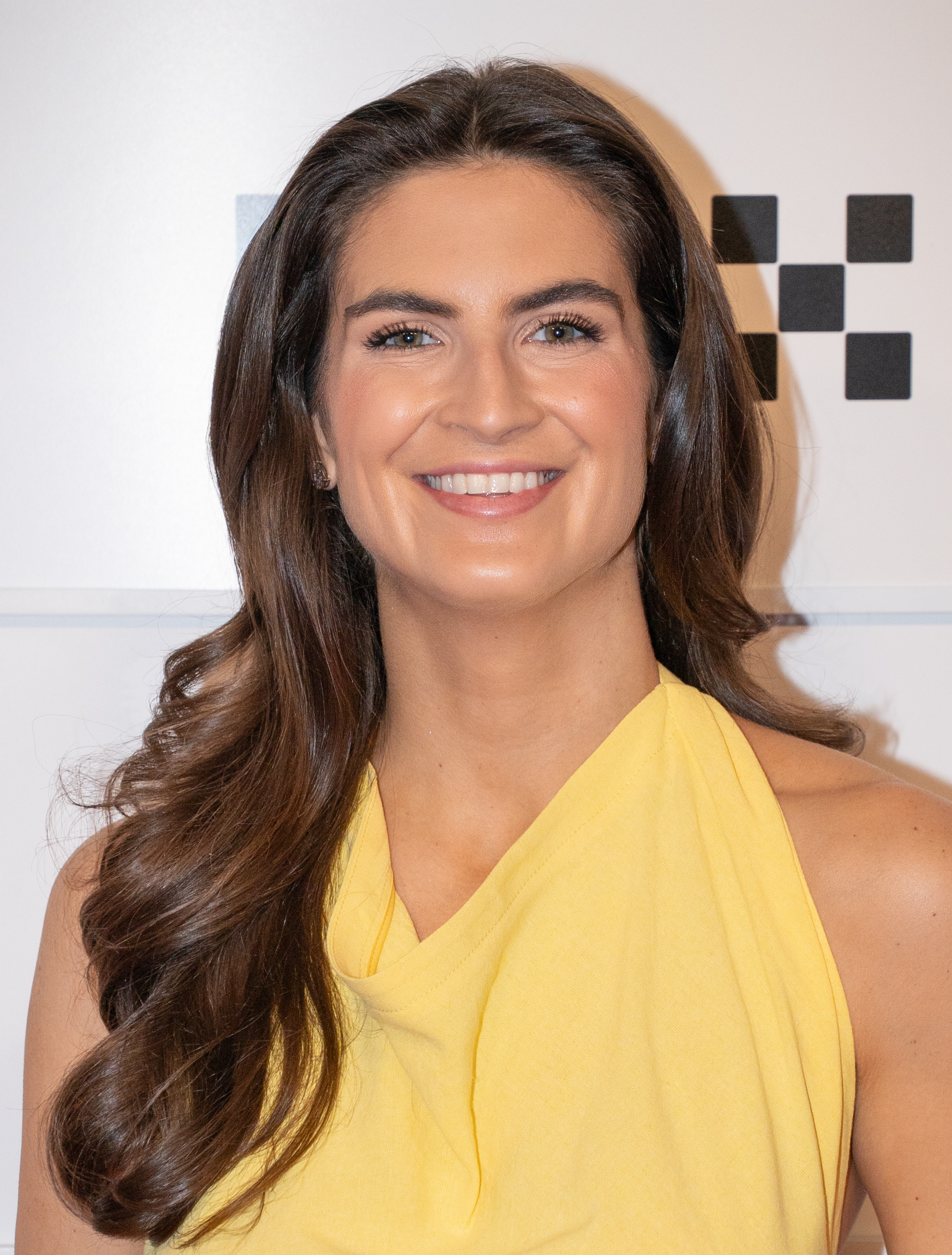
Kaitlan Collins

- Kaitlan Collins, journalist who served as chief White House correspondent for CNN until 2022
- Jan Crawford, TV journalist who serves as a political correspondent and chief legal correspondent for CBS News
- Rece Davis, sports TV journalist for ESPN/ABC
- Germany Kent, TV journalist
- Howell Raines, journalist and former executive editor of The New York Times
- Joe Scarborough, TV host, attorney, political commentator, and former politician
- Gay Talese, writer and journalist for The New York Times and Esquire magazine

=== Science and technology ===
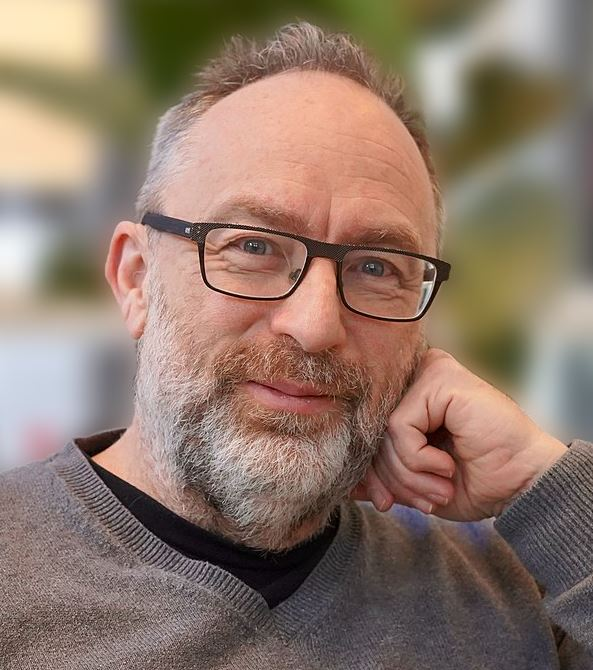
Jimmy Wales, co-founder of Wikipedia

- Lafayette Guild, medical director for the Confederate States Army
- Nathan Jacobson, mathematician who received the Leroy P. Steele Prize
- Mohammad Ataul Karim, scientist who contributed to Applied Optics
- Edward Barna Kurjack, Mayan anthropologist
- Timothy Leary, author known for his advocacy of psychedelic drugs
- Robert M. Lightfoot, Jr., 11th director of the NASA Marshall Space Flight Center
- Louis Rosen, nuclear physicist known for the Los Alamos Neutron Science Center
- Eugene Allen Smith, professor at UA who later served as Alabama state geologist
- Alexander Sotirov, computer security researcher
- Robert Van de Graaff, physicist known for inventing the Van de Graaff generator
- Jimmy Wales, co-founder of Wikipedia
- Heather Willauer, analytical chemist at the U.S. Naval Research Laboratory
- E.O. Wilson, entomologist and two-time Pulitzer Prize-winning author

=== Sports ===
==== Basketball ====
===== Active NBA players =====
- JaMychal Green, Golden State Warriors
- Herbert Jones, New Orleans Pelicans
- Kira Lewis Jr., New Orleans Pelicans
- Brandon Miller, Charlotte Hornets
- Collin Sexton, Utah Jazz

===== Retired NBA players =====
- Jason Caffey, Chicago Bulls, 20th pick overall, 1995
- Leon Douglas, Detroit Pistons, 4th pick overall, 1976
- T.R. Dunn, Portland Trail Blazers, 2nd round, 1977
- Robert Horry, Houston Rockets, San Antonio Spurs, Los Angeles Lakers, Phoenix Suns, 11th pick overall, 1992
- Buck Johnson, Houston Rockets, 20th pick overall, 1986
- Reggie King, Kansas City Kings, 18th pick overall, 1979
- Antonio McDyess, Denver Nuggets, 2nd pick overall, 1995
- Derrick McKey, Seattle SuperSonics, 9th pick overall, 1987
- Eddie Phillips, New Jersey Nets, 21st pick overall, 1982
- James Robinson, Portland Trail Blazers, 21st pick overall, 1993
- Roy Rogers, Vancouver Grizzlies, 22nd pick overall, 1996
- Latrell Sprewell, Golden State Warriors, New York Knicks, Minnesota Timberwolves, 24th pick overall, 1992
- Ennis Whatley, Kansas City Kings, 13th pick overall, 1983

==== International league players ====
- Donta Hall, Maccabi Tel Aviv of the Israeli Basketball Premier League
- Richard Hendrix, Niigata Albirex BB of the B.League
- Retin Obasohan, Derthona Basket of the LBA
- Levi Randolph, Hapoel Jerusalem of the Israeli Basketball Premier League
- Dominick Welch, KW Titans of the Basketball Super League

===== WNBA players =====
- Dominique Canty, Detroit Shock, 29th pick overall, 1999

==== Football ====
===== Active NFL players =====
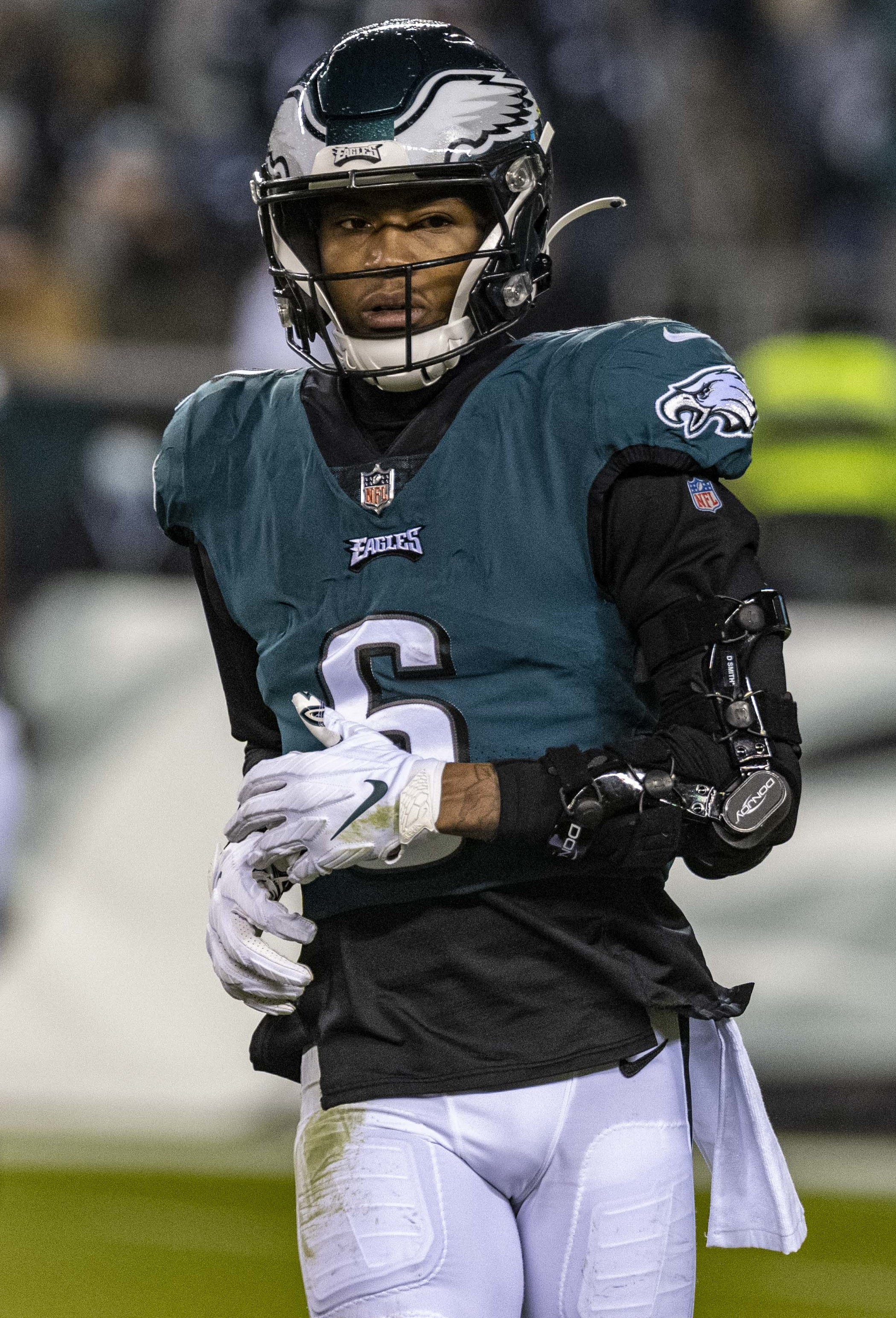
DeVonta Smith

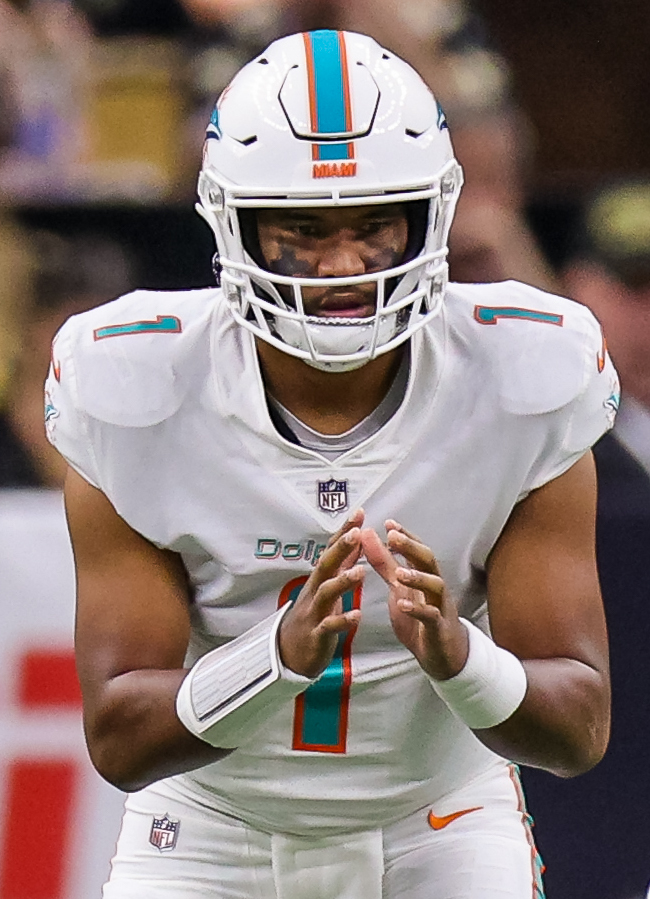
Tua Tagovailoa

- Jonathan Allen, Washington Redskins/Football Team/Commanders
- Will Anderson Jr., Houston Texans
- Christian Barmore, New England Patriots
- Brian Branch, Detroit Lions
- Landon Collins, New York Giants and Washington Redskins/Football Team
- Amari Cooper, Oakland Raiders, Dallas Cowboys, Cleveland Browns, and Buffalo Bills
- Raekwon Davis, Miami Dolphins
- Landon Dickerson, Philadelphia Eagles
- Trevon Diggs, Dallas Cowboys
- Rashaan Evans, Tennessee Titans and Atlanta Falcons
- Minkah Fitzpatrick, Miami Dolphins and Pittsburgh Steelers
- Jahmyr Gibbs, Detroit Lions
- Najee Harris, Pittsburgh Steelers
- Derrick Henry, 2015 Heisman Trophy winner; Tennessee Titans and Baltimore Ravens
- O. J. Howard, Tampa Bay Buccaneers, Houston Texans, and Las Vegas Raiders
- Marlon Humphrey, Baltimore Ravens
- Jalen Hurts, Philadelphia Eagles
- Kareem Jackson, Houston Texans and Denver Broncos
- Josh Jacobs, Oakland/Las Vegas Raiders
- Jerry Jeudy, Denver Broncos
- Mac Jones, New England Patriots
- Ryan Kelly, Indianapolis Colts
- Alex Leatherwood, Las Vegas Raiders and Chicago Bears
- Phidarian Mathis, Washington Commanders
- Xavier McKinney, New York Giants
- John Metchie III, Houston Texans
- C.J. Mosley, Baltimore Ravens and New York Jets
- Evan Neal, New York Giants
- Daron Payne, Washington Commanders
- Jarran Reed, Seattle Seahawks, Kansas City Chiefs, and Green Bay Packers
- Calvin Ridley, Atlanta Falcons and Jacksonville Jaguars
- A'Shawn Robinson, Detroit Lions, Los Angeles Rams, and New York Giants
- Cam Robinson, Jacksonville Jaguars
- DeVonta Smith, 2020 Heisman Trophy winner; Philadelphia Eagles
- Irv Smith Jr., Minnesota Vikings and Cincinnati Bengals
- Patrick Surtain II, Denver Broncos
- Tua Tagovailoa, Miami Dolphins
- Dalvin Tomlinson, New York Giants, Minnesota Vikings, and Cleveland Browns
- Jaylen Waddle, Miami Dolphins
- Jameson Williams, Detroit Lions
- Jonah Williams, Cincinnati Bengals
- Quinnen Williams, New York Jets
- Jedrick Wills, Cleveland Browns
- Bryce Young, 2021 Heisman Trophy winner; Carolina Panthers

===== Former NFL players =====
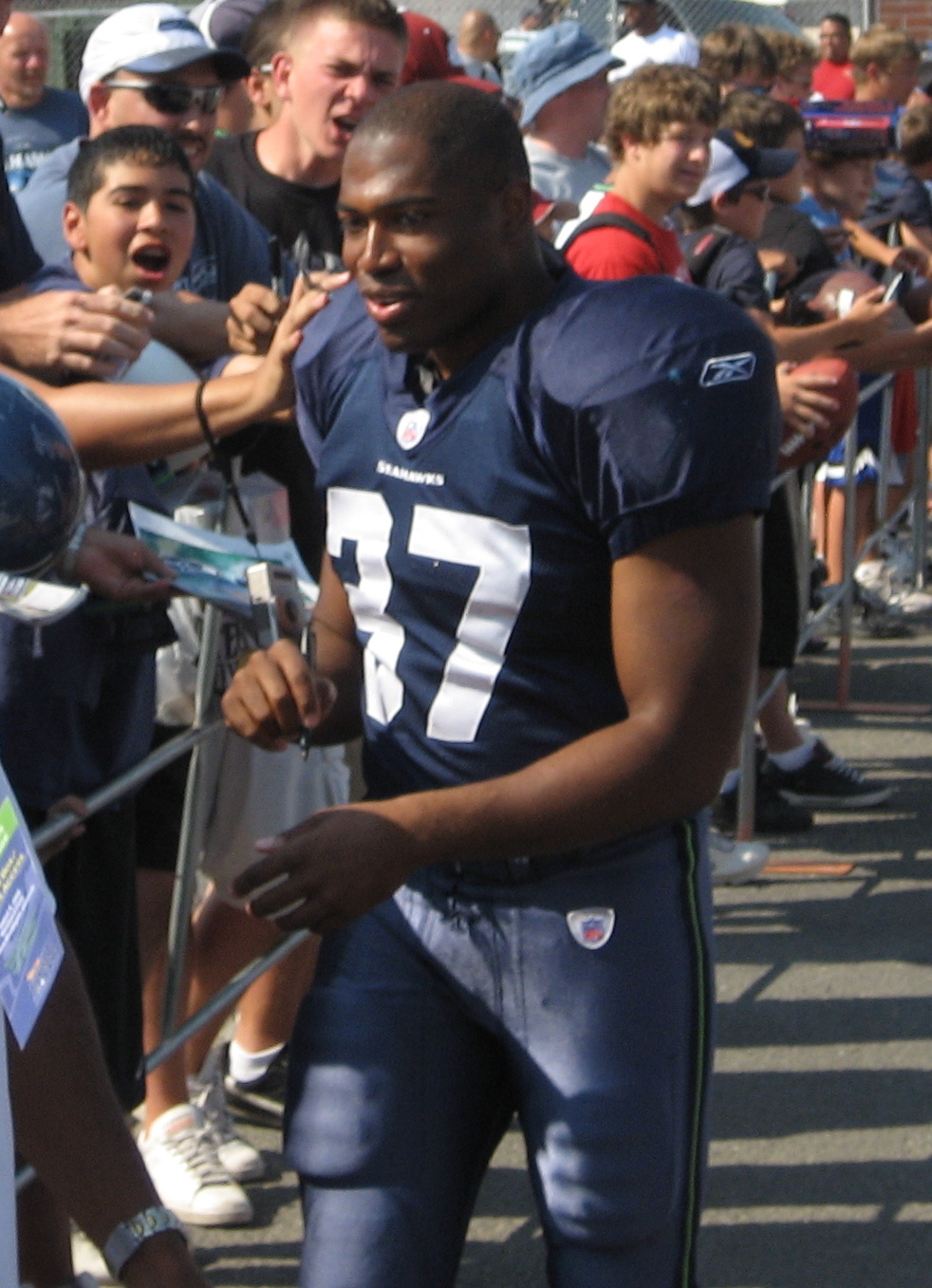
Shaun Alexander

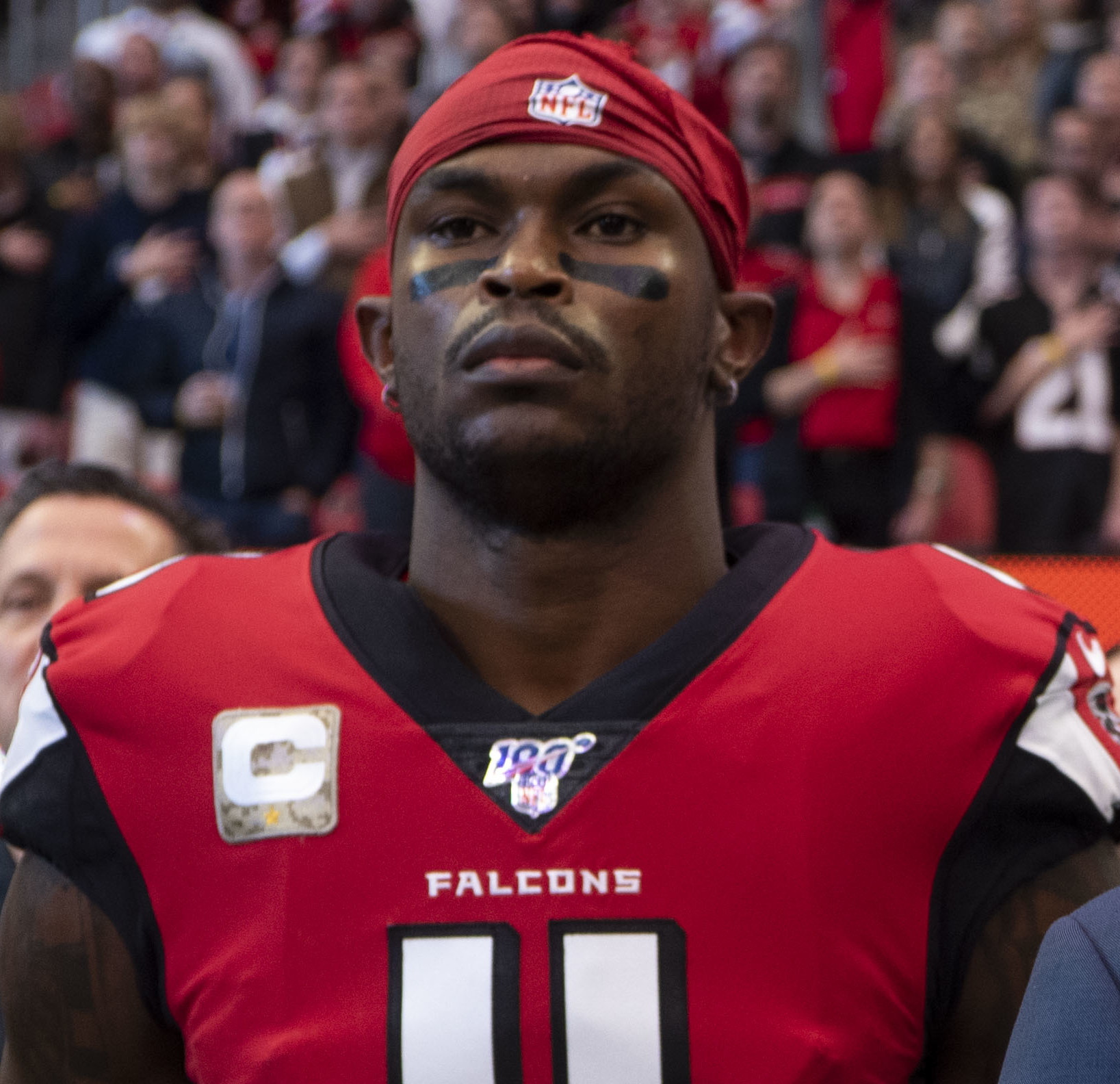
Julio Jones

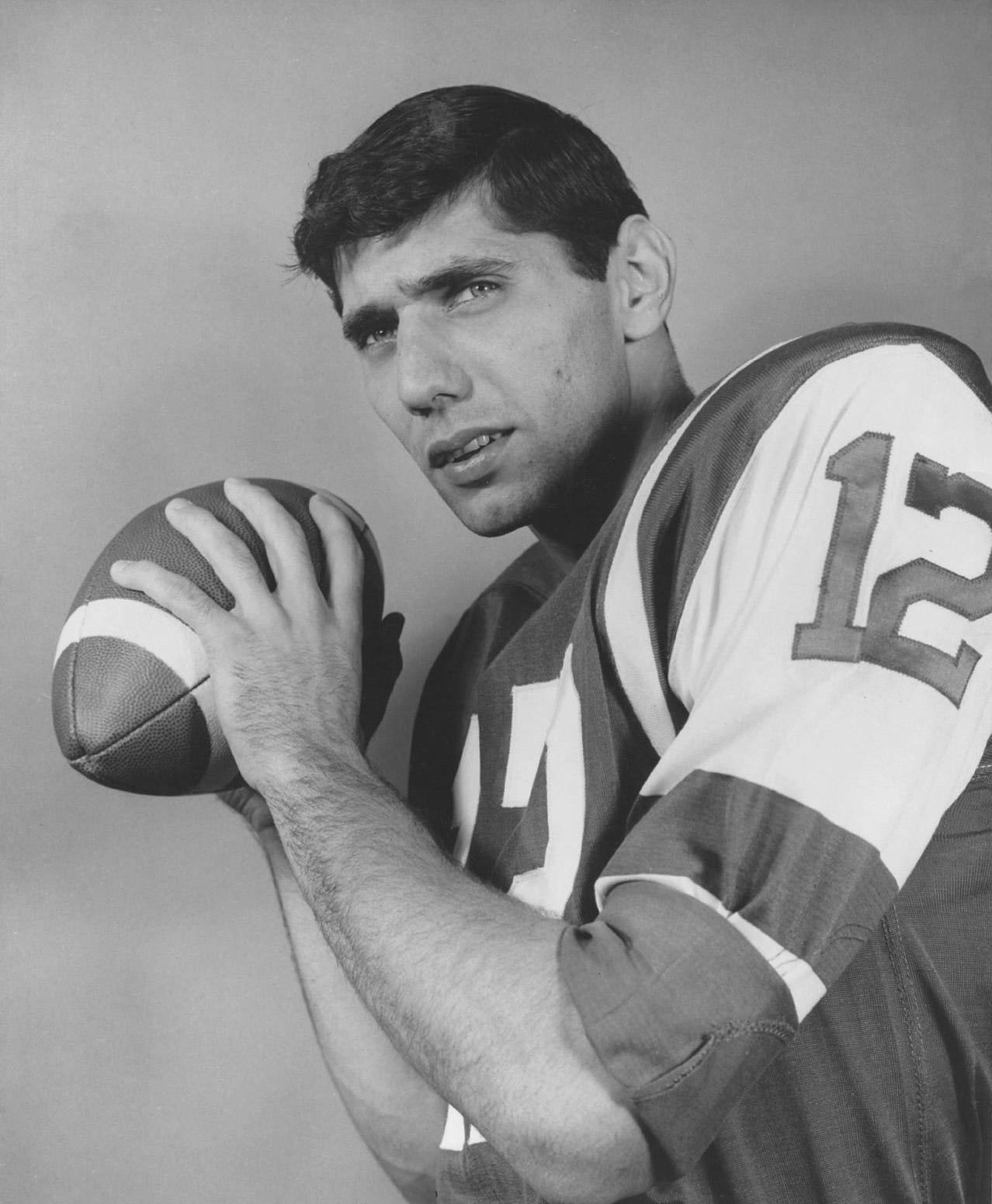
Joe Namath

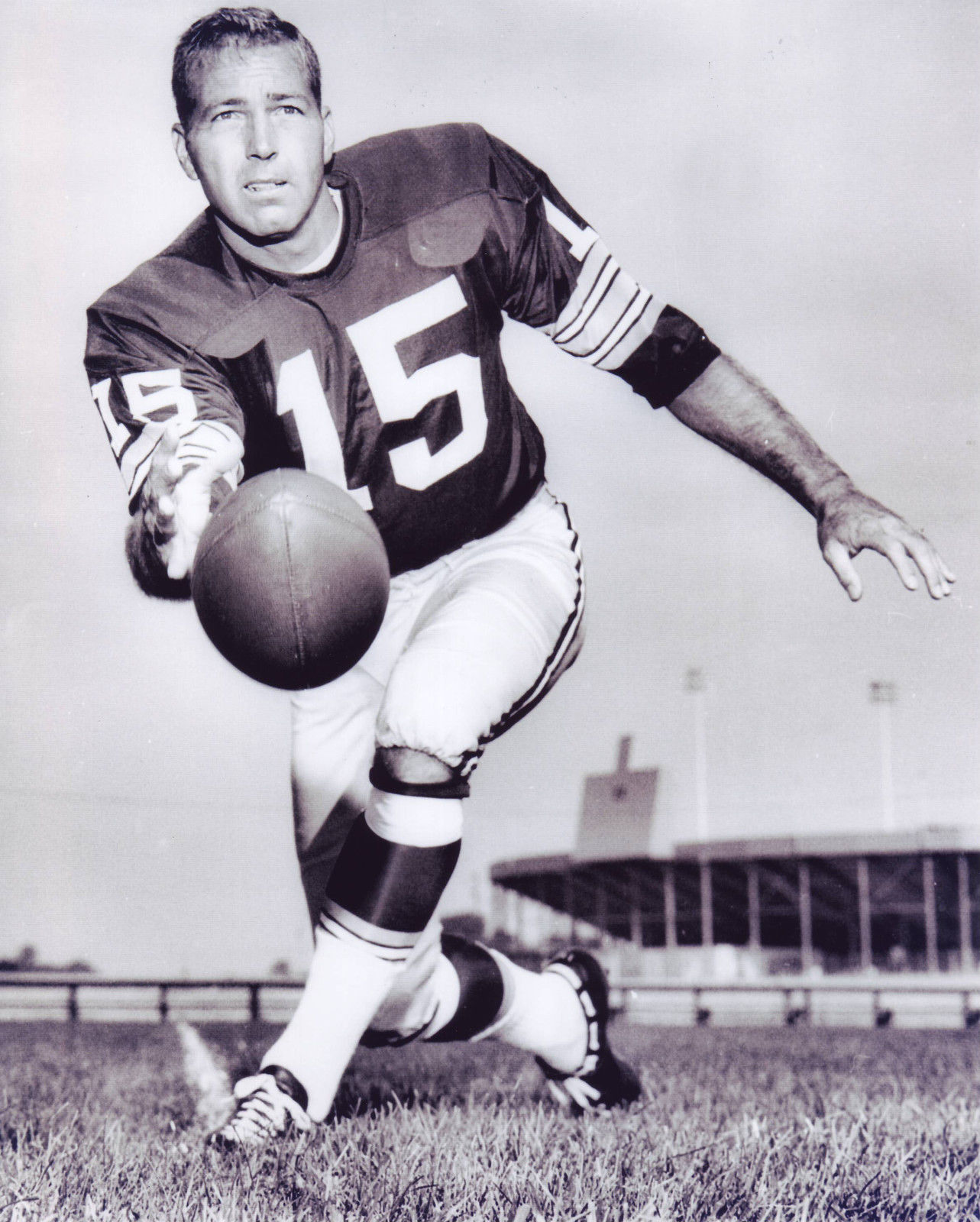
Bart Starr

- Shaun Alexander, Seattle Seahawks and Washington Redskins
- Mark Barron, Tampa Bay Buccaneers, St. Louis/Los Angeles Rams, Pittsburgh Steelers, and Denver Broncos
- Bob Baumhower, Miami Dolphins
- Cornelius Bennett, Buffalo Bills, Atlanta Falcons, and Indianapolis Colts
- Thomas Boyd, Detroit Lions
- Wesley Britt, New England Patriots
- Anthony Bryant, Tampa Bay Buccaneers, Detroit Lions, and Miami Dolphins
- James Carpenter, Seattle Seahawks, New York Jets, Atlanta Falcons, and New Orleans Saints
- Paul Ott Carruth, Green Bay Packers and Kansas City Chiefs
- Jeremiah Castille, Tampa Bay Buccaneers and Denver Broncos
- Ha Ha Clinton-Dix, Green Bay Packers, Washington Redskins, Chicago Bears, and Las Vegas Raiders
- Glen Coffee, San Francisco 49ers
- John Copeland, Cincinnati Bengals
- Howard Cross, New York Giants
- Bob Cryder, New England Patriots and Seattle Seahawks
- Eric Curry, Tampa Bay Buccaneers and Jacksonville Jaguars
- Marcell Dareus, Buffalo Bills and Jacksonville Jaguars
- D. J. Fluker, San Diego Chargers, New York Giants, Seattle Seahawks, and Baltimore Ravens
- Reuben Foster, San Francisco 49ers and Washington Redskins/Football Team
- Wallace Gilberry, Kansas City Chiefs, Tampa Bay Buccaneers, Detroit Lions, and Cincinnati Bengals
- Chris Goode, Indianapolis Colts
- Lemanski Hall, Houston/Tennessee Oilers, Chicago Bears, Dallas Cowboys, and Minnesota Vikings
- Jon Hand, Indianapolis Colts
- Charley Hannah, Tampa Bay Buccaneers and Los Angeles Raiders
- John Hannah, New England Patriots
- Patrick Hape, Tampa Bay Buccaneers, Denver Broncos, and Houston Texans
- Paul Harris, Tampa Bay Buccaneers and Minnesota Vikings
- Dont'a Hightower, New England Patriots
- Bobby Humphrey, Denver Broncos and Miami Dolphins
- Scott Hunter, Green Bay Packers, Buffalo Bills, Atlanta Falcons, and Detroit Lions
- Don Hutson, Green Bay Packers
- Mark Ingram II, 2009 Heisman Trophy winner; New Orleans Saints, Baltimore Ravens, and Houston Texans
- Wilbur Jackson, San Francisco 49ers and Washington Redskins
- Joey Jones, Atlanta Falcons
- Julio Jones, Atlanta Falcons, Tennessee Titans, Tampa Bay Buccaneers, and Philadelphia Eagles
- Lee Roy Jordan, Dallas Cowboys
- E. J. Junior, St. Louis/Phoenix Cardinals, Miami Dolphins, Tampa Bay Buccaneers, and Seattle Seahawks
- Emanuel King, Cincinnati Bengals and Los Angeles Raiders
- B'Ho Kirkland, Brooklyn Dodgers (NFL)
- Dre Kirkpatrick, Cincinnati Bengals, Arizona Cardinals, and San Francisco 49ers
- Barry Krauss, Baltimore/Indianapolis Colts and Miami Dolphins
- Eddie Lacy, Green Bay Packers and Seattle Seahawks
- Antonio Langham, Cleveland Browns, Baltimore Ravens, San Francisco 49ers, and New England Patriots
- Larry Lauer, Green Bay Packers
- Antonio London, Detroit Lions and Green Bay Packers
- Marty Lyons, New York Jets
- John Mangum, Chicago Bears
- Keith McCants, Tampa Bay Buccaneers, Houston Oilers, and Arizona Cardinals
- A. J. McCarron, Cincinnati Bengals, Oakland Raiders, Houston Texans, and Atlanta Falcons
- Greg McElroy, New York Jets and Cincinnati Bengals
- Le'Ron McClain, Baltimore Ravens, Kansas City Chiefs, and San Diego Chargers
- Don McNeal, Miami Dolphins
- Chris Mohr, Tampa Bay Buccaneers, Buffalo Bills, Atlanta Falcons, and Washington Redskins
- Russ Mosley, Green Bay Packers
- Michael Myers, Dallas Cowboys, Cleveland Browns, Denver Broncos, and Cincinnati Bengals
- Joe Namath, New York Jets and Los Angeles Rams
- Billy Neighbors, Boston Patriots and Miami Dolphins
- Ozzie Newsome, Cleveland Browns
- David Palmer, Minnesota Vikings
- Ray Perkins, Baltimore Colts
- Mike Pitts, Atlanta Falcons, Philadelphia Eagles, and New England Patriots
- Dwayne Rudd, Minnesota Vikings, Cleveland Browns, and Tampa Bay Buccaneers
- Henry Ruggs, Las Vegas Raiders
- DeMeco Ryans, Houston Texans and Philadelphia Eagles
- Jeff Rutledge, Los Angeles Rams, New York Giants, and Washington Redskins
- Chris Samuels, Washington Redskins
- Sam Shade, Cincinnati Bengals and Washington Redskins
- Andre Smith, Cincinnati Bengals, Minnesota Vikings, Arizona Cardinals, and Baltimore Ravens
- Ken Stabler, Oakland Raiders, Houston Oilers, and New Orleans Saints
- Siran Stacy, Philadelphia Eagles
- Bart Starr, Green Bay Packers (two-time Super Bowl MVP)
- Rebel Steiner, Green Bay Packers
- Dwight Stephenson, Miami Dolphins
- George Teague, Green Bay Packers, Dallas Cowboys, and Miami Dolphins
- Derrick Thomas, Kansas City Chiefs
- Richard Todd, New York Jets and New Orleans Saints
- Kevin Turner, New England Patriots and Philadelphia Eagles
- Courtney Upshaw, Baltimore Ravens and Atlanta Falcons
- T. J. Yeldon, Jacksonville Jaguars and Buffalo Bills

===== Retired CFL players =====
- Trevis Smith, Saskatchewan Roughriders

===== Pro Football Hall of Fame =====
- John Hannah
- Don Hutson
- Joe Namath
- Ozzie Newsome
- Ken Stabler
- Bart Starr
- Dwight Stephenson
- Derrick Thomas

===== NFL coaches =====
- Freddie Kitchens ('97), head Coach, Cleveland Browns
- John Mitchell, assistant coach, Pittsburgh Steelers
- Ray Perkins ('66), head coach, New York Giants and Tampa Bay Buccaneers
- Jeff Rutledge ('79), quarterbacks coach, Arizona Cardinals
- Bart Starr ('56), head coach, Green Bay Packers

===== College football coaches =====
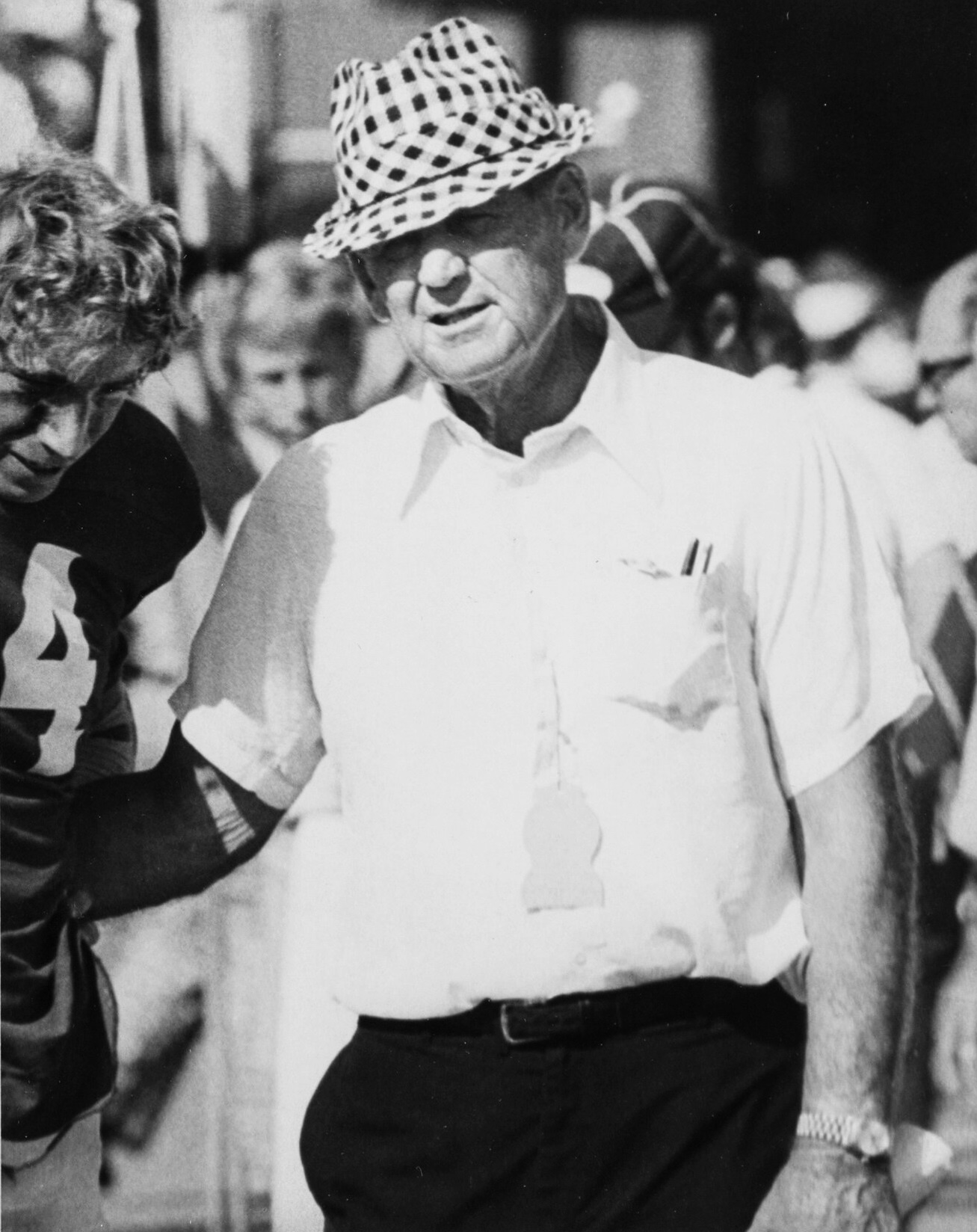
Bear Bryant

- Bill Battle ('62), head coach, Tennessee Volunteers 1970–76
- Bobby Bowden ('48), head coach, Florida State Seminoles 1976–2009
- Paul "Bear" Bryant ('36), head coach, UA 1958–82, Texas A&M Aggies 1954–57, Kentucky Wildcats 1946–53, Maryland Terrapins 1945
- Neil Callaway ('78), head coach, UAB Blazers 2007–11
- Sylvester Croom ('75), head coach, Mississippi State Bulldogs 2004–08
- David Cutcliffe ('76), head coach, Duke Blue Devils 2008–21, Ole Miss Rebels 1998–2004
- Danny Ford ('70 and '71), head coach, Arkansas Razorbacks 1993–97, Clemson Tigers 1978–89
- Frank Howard ('30), head coach, Clemson Tigers 1940–69
- Hootie Ingram ('55), head coach, Clemson Tigers 1970–72
- Charley Pell ('64), head coach, Florida Gators 1979–84, Clemson Tigers 1977–1978, Jacksonville State Gamecocks 1969–73
- Ray Perkins ('66), head coach, Arkansas State Red Wolves 1992, UA 1983–86
- Mike Riley ('74), head coach, Oregon State Beavers 2003–14 and 1997–98
- Jackie Sherrill ('65), head coach, Mississippi State Bulldogs 1991–03, Texas A&M Aggies 1982–88, Pittsburgh Panthers 1977–81, Washington State Cougars 1976
- Mike Shula ('87), head coach, UA 2003–2006
- Steve Sloan ('65), head coach, Duke Blue Devils 1983–86, Ole Miss Rebels 1978–82, Texas Tech Red Raiders 1975–77, Vanderbilt Commodores 1973–74
- Dabo Swinney ('93), head coach, Clemson Tigers 2009–present

==== Softball ====
- Kelly Kretschman, head coach of the USSSA Pride in Women's Professional Fastpitch; nine-time professional All-Star; U.S. Olympian who won a gold medal at the 2004 Summer Olympics and a silver medal at the 2008 Summer Olympics
- Charlotte Morgan, head coach of Cal State Northridge; 1st draft pick in the 2010 NPF Senior Draft for the USSSA Pride
- Brittany Rogers, four-time All-American at UA

==== Baseball ====
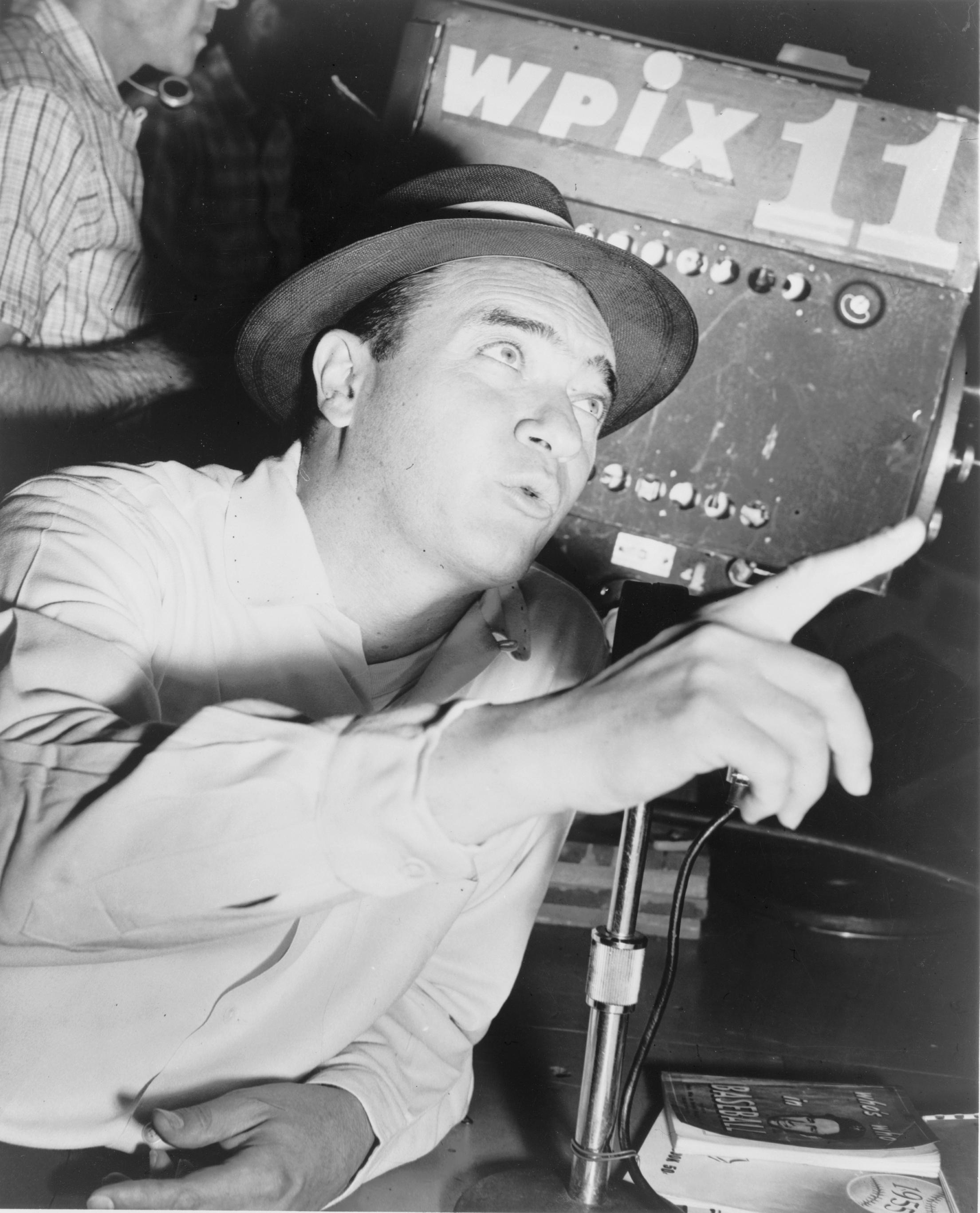
Mel Allen

- Mel Allen, sportscaster best known for his long tenure as the primary play-by-play announcer for the New York Yankees
- Andy Cohen, New York Giants
- Lance Cormier, Arizona Diamondbacks, Atlanta Braves, Baltimore Orioles, Tampa Bay Rays, and Los Angeles Dodgers
- Butch Hobson, Boston Red Sox, California Angels, and New York Yankees
- Tommy Hunter, Texas Rangers, Baltimore Orioles, Chicago Cubs, Cleveland Indians, Tampa Bay Rays, Philadelphia Phillies, and New York Mets
- Frank Lary, Detroit Tigers, New York Mets, Milwaukee Braves, New York Mets, and Chicago White Sox
- Dave Magadan, New York Mets, Florida Marlins, Seattle Mariners, Houston Astros, Chicago Cubs, Oakland Athletics, and San Diego Padres
- Frank Menechino, Oakland Athletics and Toronto Blue Jays
- Dustan Mohr, Minnesota Twins, San Francisco Giants, Colorado Rockies, Boston Red Sox, and Tampa Bay Devil Rays
- Adam Morgan, Philadelphia Phillies and Chicago Cubs
- Andy Phillips, New York Yankees, Cincinnati Reds, and New York Mets
- Del Pratt, St. Louis Browns, New York Yankees, Boston Red Sox, and Detroit Tigers
- David Robertson, New York Yankees, Chicago White Sox, Philadelphia Phillies, Tampa Bay Rays, Chicago Cubs, New York Mets, and Miami Marlins
- Max Rosenfeld, Brooklyn Robins/Dodgers
- Emeel Salem, Tampa Bay Rays
- Joe Sewell, member of the Baseball Hall of Fame; two-time World Series champion; Cleveland Indians and New York Yankees
- Luke Sewell, younger brother of Joe Sewell; Cleveland Indians, Washington Senators, Chicago White Sox, and St. Louis Browns
- Craig Shipley, Los Angeles Dodgers, New York Mets, San Diego Padres, Houston Astros, San Diego Padres, and Anaheim Angels
- Fred Sington, Washington Senators and Brooklyn Dodgers
- Riggs Stephenson, Cleveland Indians and Chicago Cubs
- Al Worthington, World Series champion; New York / San Francisco Giants, Boston Red Sox, Chicago White Sox, Cincinnati Reds, and Minnesota Twins

==== Golf ====
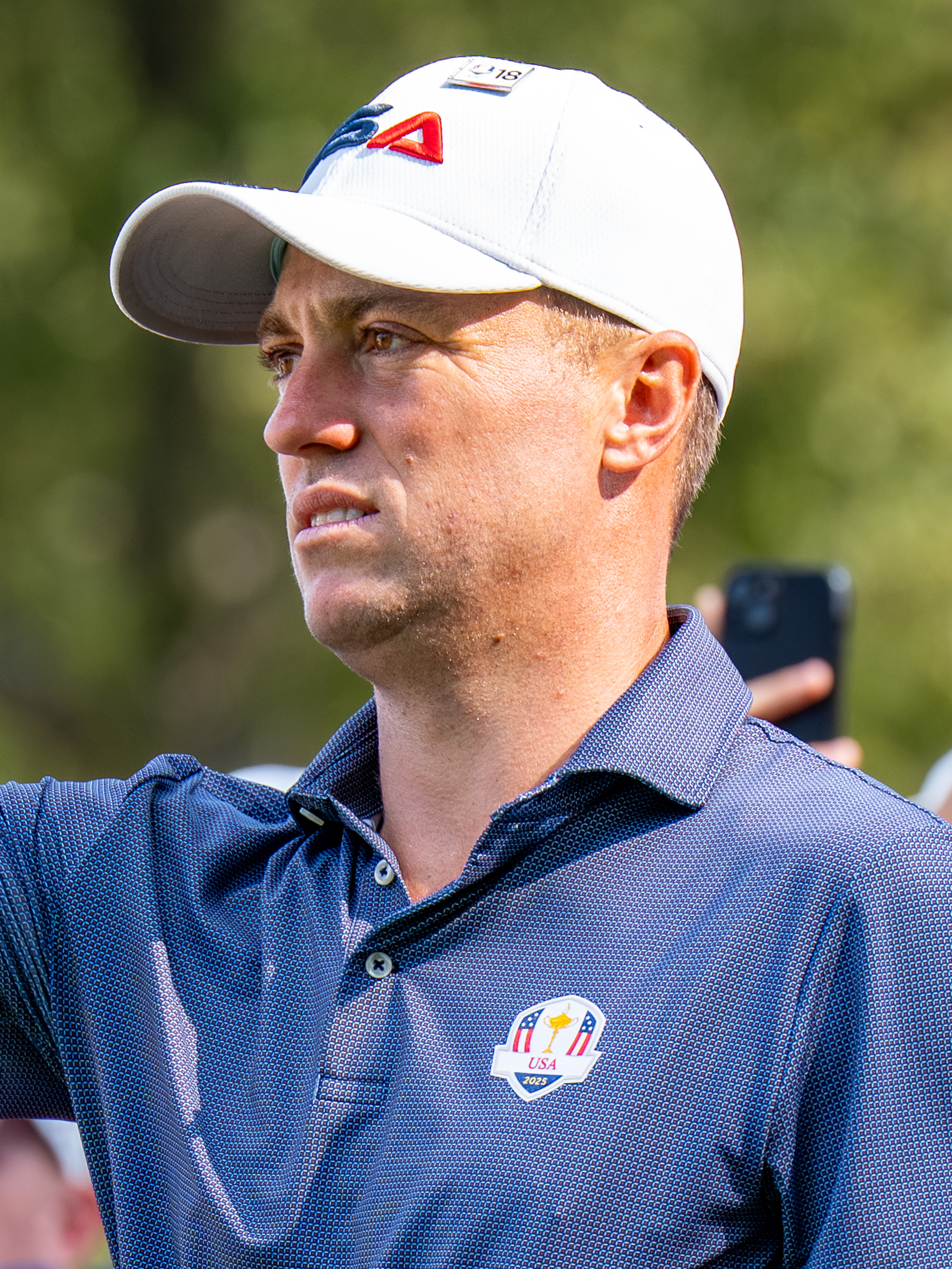
Justin Thomas

- Jason Bohn, PGA Tour
- Bud Cauley, PGA Tour
- Nick Dunlap, PGA Tour
- Steve Lowery, PGA Tour
- Trey Mullinax, PGA Tour
- Jerry Pate, PGA Tour, winner of the U.S. Open in 1976
- Dicky Pride, PGA Tour
- Justin Thomas, PGA Tour, winner of the PGA Championship in 2017 and 2022
- Michael Thompson, PGA Tour
- Bobby Wyatt, PGA Tour

==== Gymnastics ====
- Terin Humphrey, U.S. Olympian and won two silver medals at the 2004 Summer Olympics

==== Swimming & diving ====
- Cameron Henning, Canadian Olympian who won a bronze medal at the 1984 Summer Olympics (200m backstroke)
- Justin Lemberg, Australian Olympian who won a bronze medal at the 1984 Summer Olympics (400m freestyle)
- Jon Olsen, U.S. Olympian who won a total of four gold medals at the 1992 Summer Olympics and the 1996 Summer Olympics
- Anne Poleska, German Olympian who won a bronze medal at the 2004 Summer Olympics (200m breaststroke) and competed at the 2000 Summer Olympics and the 2008 Summer Olympics
- Jon Sieben, Australian Olympian who won a gold medal at the 1984 Summer Olympics (200m butterfly)
- Jonty Skinner, coach of the U.S. national swim team and member of the International Swimming Hall of Fame
- Mark Tonelli, Australian Olympian who won a gold medal at the 1976 Summer Olympics (400m medley relay) and competed at the 1980 Summer Olympics
- Susan Williams, U.S. Olympian who won a bronze medal at the 2004 Summer Olympics (Triathlon)

==== Tennis ====
- Juan Carlos Bianchi, Venezuelan Olympian who competed at the 1996 Summer Olympics
- Ellis Ferreira, won two Grand Slam doubles titles, including the Men's title at the 2000 Australian Open and the mixed doubles at the Australian Open in 2001; South African Olympian who competed at the 1996 Summer Olympics

==== Track & field ====
- Pauline Davis-Thompson, Bahamian Olympian who competed in five Olympics, including the 2000 Summer Olympics, where she won two gold medals (4x100m relay and 200m)
- Kirani James, Grenadian Olympian who won a gold medal at the 2012 Summer Olympics (400m)
- Jan Johnson, U.S. Olympian who won a bronze medal at the 1972 Summer Olympics (pole vault)
- Emmit King, 1983 NCAA champion (100m); bronze medal at the 1983 World Championships (100m)
- Lillie Leatherwood, U.S. Olympian who won a gold medal at the 1984 Summer Olympics and a silver medal at the 1988 Summer Olympics (4x400m relay)
- Liz McColgan, British and Scottish Olympian who won a silver medal at the 1988 Summer Olympics and competed at the 1992 Summer Olympics and the 1996 Summer Olympics (10,000m)
- Calvin Smith, U.S. Olympian who won a gold medal at the 1984 Summer Olympics (4x100m relay); former world record holder in the 100m with 9.93 seconds in 1983

==== Other ====
- Eryk Anders, mixed martial artist and UFC Middleweight
- Chloe Holladay, NFL majorette for the Tennessee Titans
- Reece Weaver, Dallas Cowboy Cheerleader, actress and author

== Notable faculty ==
- Dinsmore Alter, physics
- Amalia Amaki, art
- Marshall Applewhite, music
- Anthony Joseph Arduengo III, chemistry
- Margaret Atwood, English
- Donald Barthelme, English
- Robin Behn, creative writing
- Philip Beidler, American literature
- David T. Beito, history
- Rick Bragg, journalism
- Joel Brouwer, English
- Carl Carmer, English
- Cornelius Carter, dance
- Philip B. Coulter, political science
- Philip Daileader, history
- Frank Duarte, physics
- Abdurrahim El-Keib, engineering
- John Engels, English
- Prasad Gogineni, engineering
- Barry Hannah, creative writing
- John P. Hermann, Old English
- Julie Laible, education
- Nathaniel Thomas Lupton, president of UA (1871–1874)
- Roscoe C. Martin, political science; director of the Bureau of Public Administration at UA (1938–1949)
- Michael Martone, creative writing
- Forrest McDonald, history
- Micki McElya, history
- Steve Sample Sr., music
- Forrest Scogin, clinical psychology
- Annette Shelby, speech and business
- Hudson Strode, creative writing
- Donald S. Strong, political science
- Michael Tuomey, geology
- William J. Vaughn, mathematics
