= Gogineni =

Gogineni is a Telugu patronymic family name. Notable people with the surname include:

- N. G. Ranga (born Acharya Gogineni Ranga Nayukulu, 1900–1995), Indian freedom fighter
- Prasad Gogineni, American engineer
