= Christopher Curry =

Christopher or Chris Curry may refer to:

- Christopher Curry (businessman) (born 1946), British businessman, co-founder of Acorn Computers
- Christopher Curry (actor) (born 1948), American actor
- Chris Curry, the pen name of Tamara Thorne (born 1957), American writer
- Chris Curry (born 1977), head coach of the University of Arkansas at Little Rock baseball team

== See also ==
- Chris Currie, the victim of a 2005 manslaughter in New Zealand
