= Gurwitch Products =

Cosmetics Products

- Company type: Cosmetics company
- Industry: Cosmetics
- Founded: 1995
- Headquarters: Stafford, Texas
- Area served: Worldwide
- Owner: Shiseido
- Website: www.gurwitchproducts.com

Gurwitch Products is a Houston, Texas-based subsidiary of Shiseido that produces, manages, and markets cosmetics and skincare products. Gurwitch produces and markets products under two brands, Laura Mercier Cosmetics and RéVive Skincare.

== Company history ==
Gurwitch Products was founded by Janet Gurwitch, the former executive vice president of Neiman Marcus, and Gary M. Kusin in 1995. With makeup artist Laura Mercier, Gurwitch and Kusin licensed Laura Mercier's name and created the Laura Mercier Cosmetics brand in 1996. Gurwitch's former employer, the Neiman Marcus Group, purchased a 51 percent stake in the company in 1999.

In August 2006, Gurwitch Products, which was valued more than $120 million at that time, was acquired by and became a wholly owned subsidiary of Alticor. In 2008, the company acquired the premium anti-aging skincare products line RéVive Skincare, along with its parent company, Bays Brown Laboratories. Janet Gurwitch resigned in 2008. Shiseido acquired Gurwitch Products in 2016.

The company maintains corporate offices in Manhattan, Houston and London, and its products are sold in more than 1,000 stores across 27 countries.
