= Bidtopia =

E-commerce website

- Company type: Privately Held
- Industry: Service
- Founded: 2007
- Defunct: 2010
- Headquarters: Memphis, Tennessee, United States
- Number of employees: 160 (2007)
- Parent: Bargainland / Warehouse86 Ventures, LLC
- Website: www.bidtopia.com (defunct) www.warehouse86.com (defunct)

Bidtopia was an e-commerce site originally launched in 2007 as a private auction site for Warehouse86 Ventures, LLC. Paul St. James, an owner of Bargainland, which had been the largest PowerSeller on eBay that same year, started the new enterprise in response to changes in eBay policies regarding high volume sales of brand name merchandise and restrictions on sellers with poor customer feedback. Bidtopia suffered the loss of one of its three distribution centers in 2008, and went offline and possibly out of business in early 2010.

== Features and policies ==
Bidtopia was designed with innovative features meant to enhance the online auction format, such as a unique feedback system, a requirement that all items can be sold for as little as 99 cents, and "popcorn bidding", a response to concerns about last second bids, or auction "sniping", wherein the auction deadline was extended by one minute if there was a bid within the last minute before the auction was to close. Bidtopia later allowed other sellers with online business experience into their marketplace and added the requirement that seller accounts and bidder accounts be mutually exclusive, as their needs and desires are vastly different. Under Bidtopia's feedback system buyers were allowed to leave a positive, neutral or negative feedback message for a seller for any reason, at any time after the completion of the auction, and even if the sale itself was not completed. Sellers, however, were limited to making a +1 or -1 change to the buyer's Transaction Score, a metric of how many times the buyer had followed through with payment for auctions they had won. Bidtopia's philosophy was that a bidder had a single obligation in the auction transaction, to pay for their order in a timely fashion. The buyer would receive a -1 in the event that a seller reported that they had not paid promptly, and would receive a +1 if the seller reported a successful transaction. The buyer would also automatically receive a +1 if after 30 days the seller had failed to make a negative report. Any bidder whose account accrued a Transaction Score of less than 90%, and had 5 or more negative transactions would be suspended from further bidding.

== Other key differences ==
Unlike their competitors in the online auction space, Bidtopia required that new bidders verify their identity and ability to pay with a 99 cent sign-up fee. Initially, there was only one seller, Bidtopia itself, but later the marketplace was expanded to include other sellers with online auction experience. Sellers could not sign up and shortly thereafter start creating auctions, but instead had to be individually approved by Bidtopia's management, a requirement meant to help curb problems related to fraud and the sale of stolen goods. Bidtopia had no means for sellers to directly create auctions via its website, instead of requiring that such sellers use either software of their creation or third-party tools designed to interact with the application programming interface for Bidtopia's auction software.

== Final years ==
In 2008, Bidtopia's distribution center in Southaven, Mississippi was badly damaged when it was struck by a tornado. What little had survived was destroyed a week later by a fire that engulfed the facility, forcing Bidtopia to run its operations from its two other locations, in Mississippi and Utah. Bidtopia, which had been reportedly doing well to that point, sought out and agreed upon a partnership with Ken May and Bill Doherty, a former CEO and executive, respectively, of FedEx, and seemed to be on the road to recovery. But within a year the company would be off the Internet, with customers reporting that in early February 2010, Bidtopia stopped allowing new auctions to be started, and would not respond to queries from customers, sellers, or the news media. With no new auctions, activity on the site slowed to a crawl and then died. In June 2010, Bidtopia announced plans to restructure the site once again as a private marketplace, but some time thereafter the site was made inaccessible to visitors, and it has not reappeared since.

== Controversy ==
Prior to the founding of Bidtopia, Bargainland was a controversial seller on eBay. While it was the largest seller on eBay in 2007 and had over a million positive feedback message, it also had one of the lowest feedback scores of any high volume seller at the time, dipping below 90% positive on several occasions. Owner Paul St. James claimed that the reasons for this low feedback were due to the nature of his business in remaindered, damaged or liquidated goods, and unfair business practices on the part of resellers who he claimed were repeat customers of his service making purchases in order to immediately resell the item on eBay at a higher price, and yet also hitting Bargainland with repeated negative feedback in hopes of discouraging their customers from purchasing directly from Bargainland.
