= Ira Thompson =

Ira Thompson may refer to:

- Ira B. Thompson (1889–1973), politician, Ku Klux Klan leader, and attorney
- Ira F. Thompson (1885–1937), Associate Justice of the Supreme Court of California
