= Stone throwing =

Violent use of stones

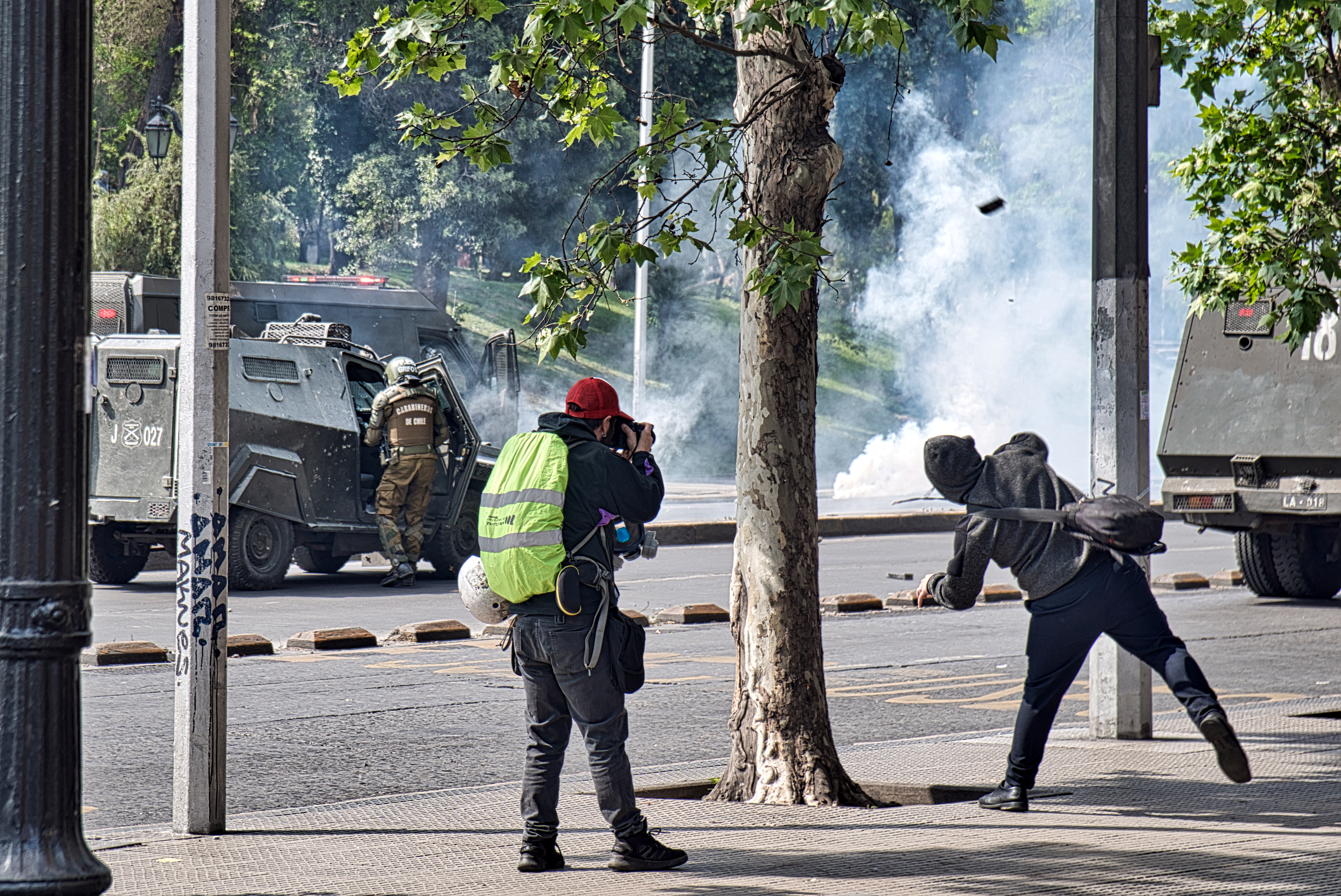
Rioter throwing stones at the riot police during the Social Outburst in Chile

Stone throwing or rock throwing, when it is directed at another person (called stone pelting in India), is often considered a form of criminal battery. In certain political contexts, stone-throwing can be considered a form of civil resistance.

== History ==
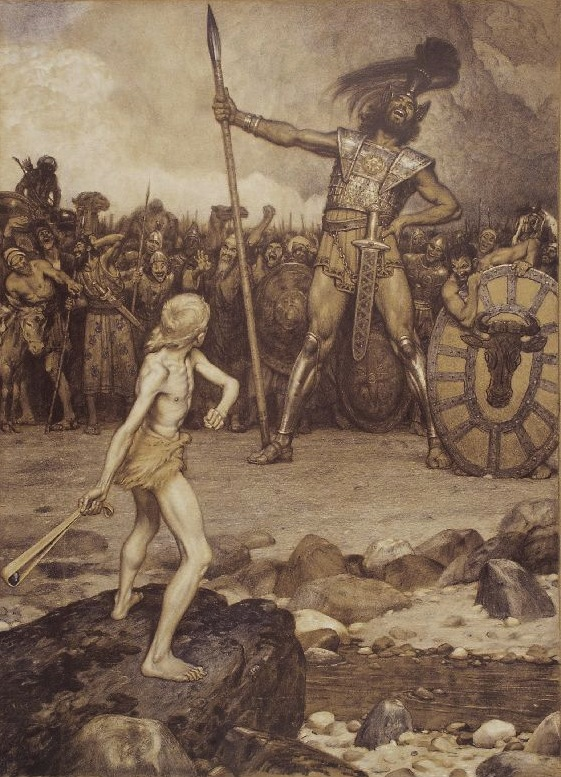
David and Goliath (1888) by Osmar Schindler

The throwing of rocks or stones is one of the most ancient forms of ranged-weapon combat, with stone-throwing slings found among other weapons in the tomb of Tutankhamun, who died about 1325 BC.

Xenophon mentions the petrobóloi (Ancient Greek: πετροβόλοι) in his work Hellenica, and Thucydides and Cassius Dio both mention the lithobóloi (λιθοβόλοι) in History of the Peloponnesian War and Histories respectively. Both terms mean stone-throwers in Ancient Greek, as army units.

De re militari (Latin "Concerning Military Matters") by the Roman writer Publius Flavius Vegetius Renatus details Roman soldiers training to throw stones as weapons. "Recruits are to be taught the art of throwing stones both with the hand and sling." And "Formerly all soldiers were trained to the practice of throwing stones of a pound weight with the hand, as this was thought a readier method since it did not require a sling."

Goguryeo held an annual national seokjeon (stone battle) attended by the king himself. Originally a product of the warlike Goguryeo period, seokjeon gradually evolved into a widely enjoyed pastime during the more peaceful Goryeo and Joseon periods.

Historically, stoning was used as a method of human execution in several cultures.

In 17th century Lisbon, it was common that war games of stone throwing would take place amongst its citizens.

In the 18th century, William Blackstone stated that throwing stones in a town or city on a highway, when it caused a death, was to be defined as manslaughter rather than murder.

In 19th century Britain, "stone throwing" was defined as a "nuisance", one of a number of offenses such as "kite-flying" and "doorbell ringing" to be handled by bylaws which differed from town to town.

Despite the blatant risks, stones have also been cast amongst children as a game, often with tragic consequences.

== Laws ==
Rock throwing during riots is a criminal offense, for which rock throwers can be charged with felony crimes, including assault on a law enforcement officer. Incidents of criminal rock throwing have resulted in arrests during sports riots; especially notable are incidents of rock-throwing football hooliganism.

=== Australia ===
In New South Wales, Section 49A of the Crimes Act 1900 provides a maximum 5-year prison sentence for "throwing rocks and other objects at vehicles and vessels".

=== India ===
Throwing of stones at Indian Armed Forces and Police is frequent in Kashmir. Usually carried out by youths, in the local language it is called "Kanni Jung", which means fighting with stones and the stone pelters are called as Sangbaaz. There are claims that the rocks are thrown in response to killings of Kashmiri separatists at the hands of forces.

=== New Zealand ===
Individuals who throw rocks at cars can serve 14 years for endangering transport.

=== Turkey ===
Turkey presses charges and imposes prison sentences for the crime of being part of a group throwing stones at police, even when the rock-throwers are 15 years of age and younger.

The Justice and Development Party (AKP) introduced a range of legal measures criminalizing both Kurdish political claims and protest activities by the Kurdistan Workers' Party (PKK). The harsh sentences handed down against stone-throwing children (taş atan çocuklar) led to a public outcry and to an amendment reducing the length of the sentences on the grounds that it was inappropriate from "a criminal justice point of view."

=== United Kingdom ===
Expansive legislation on public disorder introduced in 1986 allows stone throwers to be sentenced on average to 3 1/2 years in prison if the criminal justice system can prove that the action took place in a riot.

=== United States ===
In the United States, charges vary by state. Depending upon the facts and jurisdiction, potential charges could include disorderly conduct, assault, and battery.

In the United States individuals throwing rocks at another person can be arrested and charged with assault, criminal mischief and disorderly conduct. As a 15-year-old, actor Mark Wahlberg was charged in two separate incidents of throwing rocks and shouting racial epithets at African-American children.

Rock-throwing can be a felony and rock-throwers could face criminal charges, dependent on the circumstances that may include second degree murder, aggravated assault, throwing a missile into an occupied vehicle, criminal possession of a weapon, reckless endangerment of life, and aggravated assault with a lethal weapon. Punishment upon conviction varies as with all punishments for all crimes. A Florida judge sentenced a teenager to serve life in prison for murder by throwing rocks at cars. A New England judge, ruling on teenagers convicted of throwing stones at the windows of passing trains that resulted in eye injuries to passengers, sentenced the convicted to be kept in an eye-injury ward of a hospital for two weeks with their eyes bandaged to make them understand the consequence of their delinquency. Rock throwers could be charged, tried, and convicted even if no injuries or damage result. Under American law, rock throwers can receive significant sentences and even be sentenced to life in prison. Under American law, individuals who were part of a group engaged in rock-throwing can be convicted and imprisoned even if they did not personally throw any projectiles.

=== Vietnam ===
According to Article 12, Section 6, Section c of Decree 168/2024/NĐ-CP of the Central Government, those who "throw bricks, soil, stones, sand or other objects at people or vehicles participating in road traffic" are fined between 500,000 VND and 1,000,000 VND for individuals, and between 1,000,000 VND and 2,000,000 VND for groups.

According to Article 7, Section 4, Subsection e of Decree 144/2021/NĐ-CP of the Central Government, those who throw stones at a moving train are fined between 3,000,000 and 5,000,000 VND.

Youths convicted for throwing stones at vehicles have been prosecuted, and in serious cases, imprisoned.

== Contexts ==
Rock-throwing may occur in a variety of contexts but is often associated with assaultive offenses, demonstrations and riots, and international conflicts.

=== At people ===
Rock-throwing can be used by thieves, as was demonstrated by a 2015 case in India in which Ratan Marwadi, 45, was charged with throwing rocks at a random passer-by, Darshana Pawar, to disable and rob her. Pawar was killed by Ratan Marwadi, who had served time in jail for pelting rail commuters with stones with the intent of robbing them.

=== Vehicles ===
==== Motor vehicles ====
Rocks thrown at cars moving along highways at high speeds have been a problem in a number of countries. According to the Austin, Texas police detective Jarrett Crippen, "When we're talking about highway speeds of 60, 70 mph, that rock is hitting you full-force.... If it's coming through your windshield, it can cause serious damage to the body, vehicle or even death." A Washington State trooper said of an arrest of criminal rock-throwers, "Any one of these rocks could have punctured a windshield, hit the driver in the face and killed them." Although the rocks are often thrown from overpasses or high points along the roadside, people riding in cars have also been killed by rocks thrown at random vehicles from passing cars.

Notable instances of death and injury caused by rocks thrown at cars include the death of Julie Catherine Laible, a professor at the University of Alabama, the Darmstadt American rock-throwing incident in which American teenagers killed a 20-year-old woman and critically injured her grandmother, then hit another car, killing the 41-year-old mother of 2 small children, the death of Chris Currie, 20, on a road in New Zealand, the killing of David Wilkie by striking miners throwing rocks at cars in the United Kingdom, and the I-80 rock throwing in which youths hurled rocks from an overpass on Interstate 80 in Pennsylvania, critically injuring and permanently disfiguring a passenger. In 2017, a single American highway, Interstate 75, was the scene of the 2017 Interstate 75 rock-throwing murders.

==== Trains ====
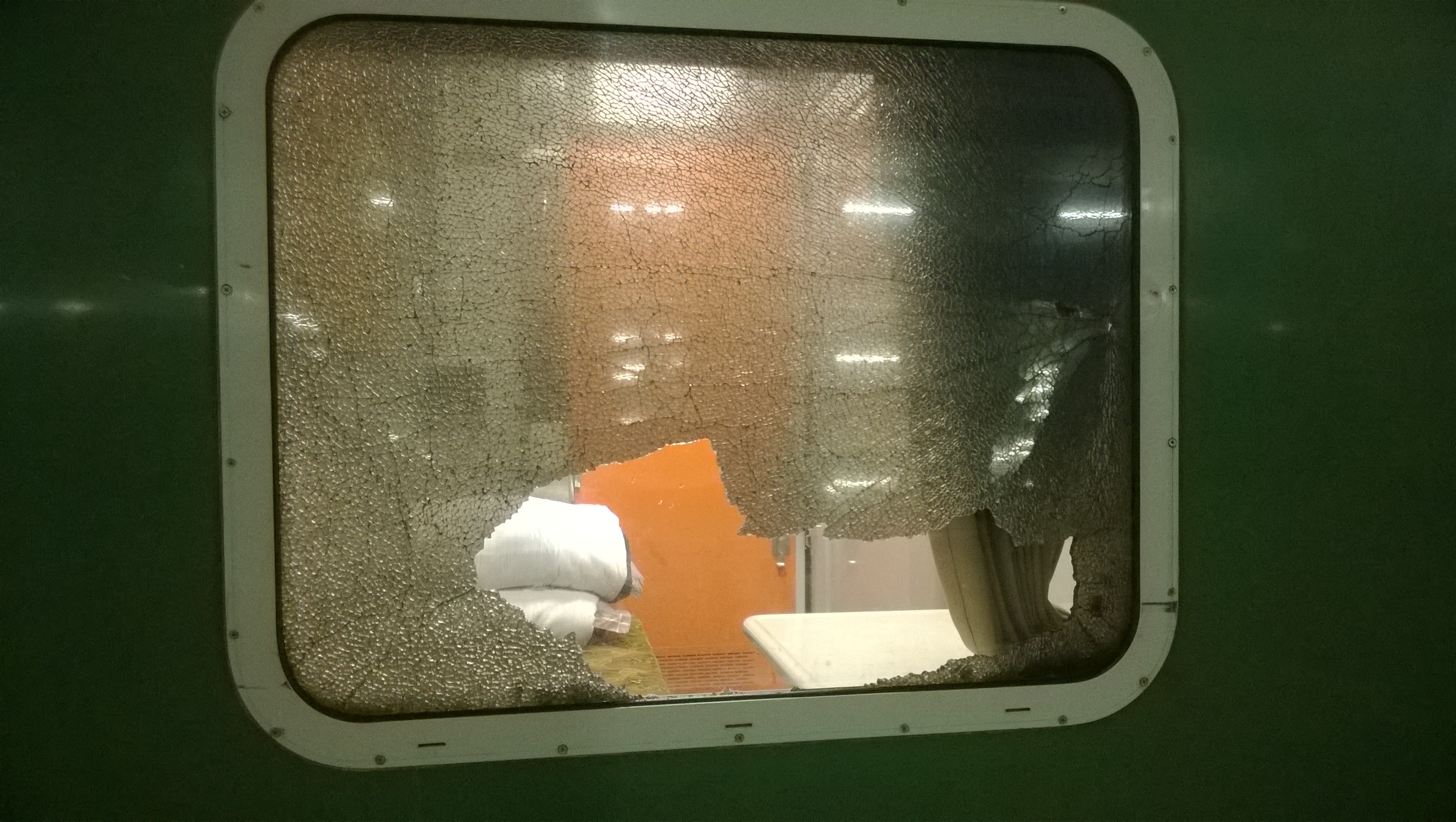
Shattered glass of a train window

Throwing rocks at trains has long been a problem in countries including the United States and New Zealand, where passengers and train crews have been injured by large rocks thrown through windows.

=== Protests and riots ===
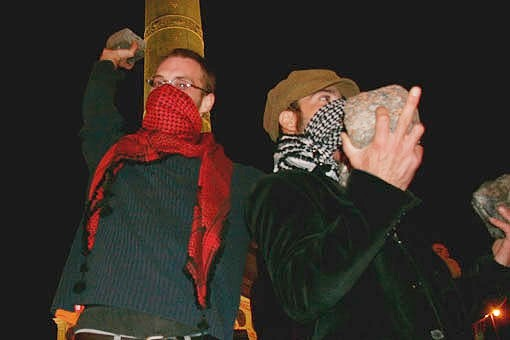
Rock throwers at a 2007 anti-Sarkozy demonstration in Paris.

Rock-throwing has been in the past often adopted as a method by an unarmed population to protest a governing power's authority. Under English common law, soldiers were not permitted to shoot at civilians engaged in that kind of protest unless their lives were in danger or they had obtained an express order from a civil magistrate.

At one point, when town officials tried to arrest a British officer who was commanding the guard at Boston Neck, Captain Ponsonby Molesworth intervened to confront a stone-throwing crowd. Molesworth ordered the soldiers to bayonet anyone throwing stones who got too close. A Boston justice told him that, under common law, a bayonet thrust was not an act of self-defense against a stone, which was not a lethal weapon. Had a soldier killed anyone, Molesworth could have been tried for his life.'

Political demonstrations in many countries have resulted with the arrest of violent protestors for throwing rocks and other objects at police.

Many notorious and deadly riots have begun with or included rock-throwing as violence escalated, including the Toronto Jubilee riots, the Boston Massacre, and the 2014 Hrushevskoho Street riots in Ukraine.

=== International borders ===
==== Egypt ====
Stone throwing rioters have repeatedly clashed with Egyptian troops at the Egypt–Gaza border.

- In 2008, Gazans assaulted Egyptian border guards by throwing barrages of rocks over the low concrete border wall topped with barbed wire, tore down a section of the wall, and opened a road and moving goods and people across for several hours before the Egyptian Army, without using lethal force, managed to regain control of the border.
- On 6 January 2010, Hamas called on Gazans to protest the Egyptian border blockade. Gazan men responded by massing at the border and throwing rocks and Molotov cocktails at the Egyptian security forces, who responded with gunfire.

==== Hungary ====
In the 2015 Horgoš riot during the European migrant crisis, illegal immigrants at the Hungarian southern border fence threw rocks and chunks of concrete at Hungarian border police.

==== Spain ====
In recent years, increasing numbers of undocumented sub-Saharan Africans have passed through Morocco attempting to reach European Union countries, and many attempt to enter Spanish soil at two Spanish enclaves, Melilla and Ceuta, on the African side of the Mediterranean Sea. On several occasions, Moroccan and Spanish border authorities have defended lethal violence against African illegal immigrants near the Melilla border fence and Ceuta border fence by asserting that groups of migrants attempting to storm the border in mass-entry events had thrown rocks to drive border guards away from the gates.

==== United States ====
Rock-throwers on the Mexican side of the Mexico–United States border frequently target US Border Patrol agents with barrages of rocks to prevent them from apprehending individuals illegally crossing the border, particularly smugglers moving illegal drugs or illegal migrants across the border. Between 2010 and 2014, Border Patrol agents were assaulted with rocks 1,700 times and fired weapons at rock throwers 43 times, resulting in 10 deaths. Border Patrol agents are permitted to respond to rock-throwers with lethal weapons, but as of 2014, the policy is to attempt to avoid finding themselves in situations in which responding to rock-throwing with lethal force becomes necessary.

== Prevention ==
In Florida, statewide policy is to install fences on highly trafficked overpasses and those near schools. An exception is Manatee County, where all overpasses have it due to a rock-throwing death in 1999.

== See also ==
- Stoning of the Devil
- Acid throwing
- David and Goliath
- Egging
- Jewish Israeli stone throwing
- Palestinian stone-throwing
- Serhildan
