= Harding Academy (Memphis, Tennessee) =

Private, Christian, co-educational school in Memphis, Tennessee, USA

Harding Academy of Memphis

Location
- Memphis, Tennessee; USA; 35.1291755°N 89.8842545°W

Information
- Former name: Memphis Christian School
- Type: Private, co-educational
- Religious affiliation: Christianity
- Established: 1952
- Status: Open
- President: Trent Williamson
- Grades: 6 weeks–Grade 12
- Gender: Co-educational
- Enrollment: 701 (2025-2026)
- Campus: Harding Academy (grades K–12) and Little Harding (6 weeks–Jr. K)
- Colors: Blue , white , and red
- Mascot: Prowler
- Nickname: Lions
- Accreditation: National Christian School Association
- Yearbook: The Shield
- Website: HardingAcademyMemphis.org

Harding Academy is a co-educational, Christian school in Memphis, Tennessee, United States, serving students from ages 6 weeks to 18 years.

== History ==
Memphis Christian School opened in 1952 with 192 students in grades K through 6. Mary Nell Hardeman Powers served as the first principal. During that year, the school acquired the King Mansion, where the Harding University Graduate School of Religion (now the Harding School of Theology) was located on Cherry Road at Park Avenue. The 1953–54 school year opened at the new 57-acre (23 ha) site, and grades seven and eight were offered for the first time. Hardeman Powers wrote the school alma mater that year.

For the 1955–56 school year, the school expanded to include ninth grade, with Marion Hickingbottom serving as the new principal. The following year, it received approval for the first time from the Tennessee State Board of Education. In the spring of 1957, Harding University in Searcy, Arkansas, was invited to assume responsibility for the school. Harding’s board of directors unanimously approved the proposal. As part of the arrangement, the Harding University Graduate School of Religion was relocated to Memphis and housed in the King Mansion, while a new building was constructed south of the mansion for the school, which was renamed Harding Academy of Memphis.

=== 1957–1997 ===
In 1957–58, the construction of the new building began, and the tenth grade was added. Harding Academy opened the 1958–59 year in the new building. It included a classroom wing, a gymnasium, and a cafeteria. A.M. Anderson became principal. Grades eleven and twelve were added, and the first graduating class, of fifteen students, received diplomas. An elementary building was also under construction and completed in March 1960.

J.E. Summitt served as superintendent for the 1960–61 school year. Harold Bowie arrived the following year and became superintendent.

Over the next decade, the Cherry Road campus continued to expand.

- An auditorium was built in 1967.
- A gymnasium, a new library, a cafeteria, and a junior high wing were completed in 1973.
- A new high school building was added in 1974.
- A third gymnasium with women's locker room facilities, a choral room, and additional classrooms opened in 1978.

Enrollment increased dramatically during the 1970s and peaked at 2,879 students in 1976. At that point, the academy was the largest private school in the United States. Many local Churches of Christ allowed the school to use their educational facilities in order to expand. By 1970–71, all elementary enrollment had moved from the Cherry Road campus into local church buildings. In 1978, the academy separated from Harding College becoming an independent school under the direction of its own board of directors.

=== Recent history ===
Harding's recent past include the opening of Early Childhood, a program for 2s and 3s, and the construction of the Cordova campus. Harding opened the new Cordova campus on Macon Road in November 1997. Early Childhood occupied one wing, and grades 1-6 were housed in the other. A second building opened at that location in the fall of 2001. The kindergarten classes joined Early Childhood in the first building constructed, and grades 1-6 occupied the newer building.

In September 2017, Harding announced that the lower school would be unifying with middle and upper schools at the Cherry Road campus at the start of the 2018–2019 school year. A multi-year multi-phase renovation plan was announced.

== Extracurricular activities ==
=== Athletics ===
Lower School students can participate in basketball, baseball, cheerleading, football, soccer, and volleyball. The upper school's athletic teams compete in the TSSAA Division II-Small conference. Sports offered include basketball, baseball, bowling, cheerleading, cross country, football, golf, pom, soccer, softball, tennis, track, and volleyball. Harding added swimming in 2009.

=== Fine arts/journalism ===
The fine arts program consists of the visual arts, instrumental music, vocal music, and drama programs. Lower school students receive weekly instruction in music and visual arts from a specialized teacher. Exploratory, beginner, and advanced visual art classes are offered to upper school students. Students in grades 7-12 can participate in band and chorus. Drama productions, including a yearly musical, are produced two or three times a year. Journalism classes are offered at the high school level, and students are admitted to these classes by applying and being accepted to the journalism staff. Journalism students publish The Lion, the school's monthly newspaper; and the Shield yearbook.

=== LEAP ===
The Learning Enrichment Advantage Program is a fee-based after-school and summer enrichment program taught by a variety of Harding teachers and parents as well as outside vendors. These short-term sessions address a variety of students' interests, needs, abilities, and learning preferences.

== Notable alumni ==
- Calvin Austin (2017), football player
- Marlon Brown (2009), former NCAA wide receiver for the Georgia Bulldogs (2009-2013), NFL player for the Baltimore Ravens (2013-2015), Denver Broncos (2016), and Chicago Bears (2018).
- Andy Fletcher (1985), Major League Baseball umpire, #49
- Ashley Henderson (2023), soccer player
- Ken May (1978), former CEO of FedEx Kinko's
- Bruce McLarty (1975), American academic administrator
- Ken A. Miller, politician
- Jay Papasan, writer and business executive
- Paul Shanklin (1981), political satirist, impressionist, and comedian
- Paul Simmons, college football coach
- Hubie Smith (1979), basketball coach
- Vince Vawter (1964), author of Paperboy, a 2014 Newbery Honor book
- Garrett Wang, actor
- Bart Williams, politician
