= Ken May =

American business executive

Kenneth A. May
- Born: Memphis, TN, USA
- Other name: Ken May
- Education: Master of Business Administration
- Alma mater: Harding Academy; University of Memphis; University of Tennessee
- Employers: United Parcel Service (1980–1982); FedEx (1982–2008); Krispy Kreme (2011–2012); Topgolf (2013–2016)
- Title: Chief Executive Officer, Topgolf International, Inc.
- Board member of: March of Dimes Trustees (chairman)

Kenneth A. May is the former CEO of FedEx Office, and chairman of the March of Dimes' board of trustees. In November 2011, he was appointed president of Krispy Kreme, and later in July 2014, May became President and CEO of Topgolf International, Inc. In November 2018, May joined golf entertainment company, Drive Shack Inc. as CEO. He is currently CEO of JumpShot.

== Early life and education ==
Born in Memphis, Tennessee, May attended Harding Academy there. A graduate of the University of Memphis and the University of Tennessee, May holds a master's degree in business administration from the latter.

=== Philanthropy ===
Ken May is a strong and effective volunteer leader for our mission, especially our Prematurity Campaign. [...] We look forward to Ken's leadership as we work towards our goal of giving every baby a healthy start in life.

— Dr. Jennifer L. Howse, President of the March of Dimes

May has a daughter Alexa, who was born 12 weeks prematurely. The 2-pound (0.91 kg) baby was kept in a neonatal intensive care unit for three months. May credits March of Dimes research with his daughter's survival. He became a volunteer, and was elected to their national board in 2004. He chaired their annual WalkAmerica fundraiser in Dallas in 2006, and was elected chairman of the board of trustees on June 18, 2007.

== Career ==
=== UPS ===
May began his career as a part-time supervisor at the United Parcel Service (UPS) and worked there for three years but had no intention of becoming a UPS truck driver — a prerequisite for full-time work with the company — given his college degree.

=== FedEx ===
In 1982 he interviewed with FedEx's Memphis hub and became a night-shift supervisor. He shipped 162,000 packages his first day. He never intended to stay with the company, expecting to only be there six months. He received a total of 13 promotions, becoming senior vice president of the domestic ground operations division of FedEx Express (where he managed 60,000 employees and oversaw all US operations), as well as senior vice president of their air-ground and freight services division.

==== Kinko's ====
In 2002, Kinko's CEO Gary Kusin tried to hire May to become his chief operating officer, an offer the latter declined. May would become the CEO of the faltering company in January 2006, after FedEx bought the chain of stores in 2004. During his two-year tenure, May experimented with the chain's formula: changing stores' sizes, formats, and merchandise, as well as implementing "a kind of hub-and-spoke system [where] one large store would handle big print jobs for surrounding small ones." When May took the reins of FedEx Kinko's, the 22,000-employee company had a turnover rate of 80 percent; two years later, in January 2008, turnover was down to 18 percent, and complaints had fallen by 65 percent.

I had a worker come tell me six years later that he still remembered that I sent a note to him when his father died and how much it meant, [...] He told me his own manager didn't take time to do anything more than authorize his bereavement pay.

— May, speaking at a leadership seminar (Memphis, 2008)

May described his style as "based on being courageous enough to be bold", which included admitting mistakes and caring about people. Priding himself on his personable relationships with the chain's employees, May wrote upwards of 25–50 notes a week congratulating employees on birthdays, promotions, new babies, and achievements.

In early 2006, May was the subject of a Time article titled "People to Watch In International Business" in which author Jeremy Caplan opined that the 45-year-old May "won't reprint his résumé anytime soon." Kenneth May resigned as CEO of FedEx Office effective March 31, 2008 after a falling out with the corporation over future strategy of the copy chain; replacing May was his COO, Brian Philips. After the announcement, FedEx shares fell $1.77, or about 2 percent.

=== Krispy Kreme ===
On 28 November 2011, May became president of Krispy Kreme.

=== Topgolf ===
In July 2013, May joined Topgolf as its chief operating officer. In July 2014, he was promoted to president and chief executive officer.

Preceded by Gary Kusin	CEO of FedEx Office; 2006–2008	Succeeded by Brian Philips
Preceded by James E. Sproull Jr.	Chairman of the March of Dimes' Board of Trustees; 2007–current	Succeeded by Incumbent
