= Gary Kusin =

American entrepreneur (born 1951)

Gary M. Kusin
- Born: 1951 (age 74–75); Texarkana, Texas, USA
- Education: University of Texas at Austin, Harvard Business School
- Known for: GameStop

Gary M. Kusin (born 1951 in Texarkana, Texas) is an American entrepreneur best known as the founder of GameStop.

== Biography ==
Kusin was born in Texarkana, Texas in 1951, and graduated from Texas High School in 1969. It was at that graduation ceremony where he introduced himself to Ross Perot, who later became Kusin's mentor.

In 1984, Kusin co-founded video game retailer Babbage's, which is now known as GameStop. In February 1995, one year after Babbage's merger with Software etc., Kusin resigned as President of the company. Following his resignation, Kusin, alongside Janet Gurwitch, founded cosmetics company Kusin Gurwitch Cosmetics. He also served as CEO and President of FedEx Kinko's from August of 2001 to 2006.

Kusin has been serving on the board of Electronic Arts since 1995, and on the board of Radio Shack from 2004 to 2005. Gary's sons Ben and Eric are also entrepreneurs. The two appeared on season 6 of ABC's Shark Tank for their company Reviver Clothing Wipes.
