= 2017 Interstate 75 rock-throwing murders =

Murders from criminal rock-throwing in Michigan and Ohio, USA

In 2017, two people were murdered in separate incidents – one in Michigan and one in Ohio – when teenagers threw rocks and sandbags from two highway overpasses along Interstate 75.

== Michigan I-75 rock-throwing murder ==
Murder of Kenneth White
- Location: Vienna Township, Michigan, U.S.
- Date: October 18, 2017
- Attack type: Murder by stone throwing
- Weapon: Rock
- Victims: Kenneth White, aged 32
- Perpetrators: Kyle Anger; Mikadyn Payne; Trevor Gray; Alexzander Miller; Mark Sekelsky
- Motive: Sadism, thrill
- Verdict: Pleaded guilty
- Convictions: Anger: Second-degree murder Payne, Gray, Miller, Sekelsky: Manslaughter
- Sentence: Anger: 3 to 20 years in prison (paroled after 3 1/4 years); Payne, Gray, Sekelsky: 1 year probation after credit for 43 months time-served. Miller: 330 days in jail followed by 1 year probation.

Kenneth White, 32, was murdered on October 18, 2017, when a 6-pound (2.7 kg) rock was thrown by a group of five teens: Mikadyn Payne, Trevor Gray, Alexzander Miller, Mark Sekelsky and Kyle Anger. The rock crashed through the windshield of the van he was riding in on Interstate 75 in Michigan, in Vienna Township, 80 miles (130 km) north of Detroit. Other cars were also damaged by rocks a group of four boys were throwing. All of the teenagers were from the Clio, Michigan area.

=== Incident ===
The teenagers confessed to having thrown multiple rocks at cars driving south on I-75 from their position on the Dodge Road overpass in Vienna Township. They also confessed to playing a game called "overpassing" where hitting a car, which was called a "dinger," earned points. They competed in this for money. The five teenagers had gathered large rocks, one weighing 20 pounds (9.1 kg), from a dead-end street in Vienna Township, loading them into the flatbed of a pickup truck, before driving to the overpass where they were dropped onto cars as they passed below.

=== Arrest of the teens involved ===
After hitting the car, the teens fled the scene and ate at a local fast food restaurant. The next day, one of the teens was questioned at school but then released. On Friday, October 20, upon hearing about the victim's death, the 5 teens exchanged text messages, including ones that said "We could go to prison for life for this, everyone lay low and no one rat us out!" and "No one saw us, if everyone shuts up we won't get caught." The next day, October 21, the police identified the vehicle in which the teens fled. After identifying the owner, the police also sought evidence of who was inside it that night. After reviewing camera footage from the fast food restaurant where the teens ate, the police identified the five teens. The following day, Sunday, October 22, the police contacted the families of the five teens involved, informing them that warrants were out for their arrest. Since they were juveniles, the teens were not arrested, but were instead told that they would have to surrender to the police by 10:30 p.m. that day. Kyle Anger reportedly attended church that day and had dinner at a restaurant with his family before surrendering to the police. All of the teens surrendered to the police by 8:30 p.m. that day.

=== Victim ===
The victim, 32-year-old Kenneth White, was seated in the passenger seat. White, a construction worker, was riding with a co-worker. The rock fractured his skull and chest and caused other facial injuries. White died from severe blunt force trauma to the head, and left behind his fiancée and his four children, the youngest being five years old.

=== Convictions ===
The teenagers surrendered to police, were arrested and charged with second-degree murder. Four of the five accepted plea deals to a reduced charge of manslaughter. In 2019, the judge rejected a request that they be sentenced as juveniles and ordered that the four be sentenced as adults, although this was later overturned by the Court of Appeal.

Anger, who was 17 at the time of the incident and who threw the rock that killed White, pled guilty to second degree murder. He received a sentence of 3 years to 20 years in prison, with credit for 740 days already served. He was released on January 20, 2021 after serving 39 months in prison. Three of the other teens were sentenced on August 4, 2021 to one year of probation after credit for 43 months time-served; the fourth teen, Alexzander Miller, had to serve an additional 330 days in jail after being released on bond June 29, 2020.

== Ohio I-75 sandbag-throwing murder ==
Murder of Marquise Byrd
- Location: Toledo, Ohio, U.S.
- Date: December 19, 2017
- Attack type: Murder by sand-bag throwing
- Victims: Marquise Byrd, aged 22
- Perpetrators: Pedro Salinas; Demetrius Wimberly; Sean Carter; William Parker
- Verdict: Pleaded guilty
- Convictions: Salinas: Murder; Wimberly, Carter, Parker: Involuntary manslaughter
- Sentence: 4-year suspended sentence

Marquise Byrd, 22, a resident of Warren, Michigan, was murdered on Interstate 75 on December 19, 2017 near Toledo, Ohio when four teenagers dropped a sandbag from a bridge onto the car in which he was a passenger.

The boys were crossing the highway on a bridge when they noticed rocks lying on the bridge, and decided to throw them at passing cars, and also threw two sandbags, running away when the second sandbag made a loud sound as it hit a vehicle. After Byrd's death, one of the teenagers, a thirteen-year-old, confessed to throwing the sandbag that killed Byrd.

Press reports compared Byrd's death to the death of Kenneth White two months earlier on the same interstate highway.

=== Victim ===
The victim, 22-year-old Marquise Byrd, was seated in the passenger seat.

=== Legal proceedings ===
The judge in the case, Denise Navarre Cubbon, initially sentenced the four teenagers to serve time at the Department of Youth Services. She sentenced three of the teenagers (14 at the time of the killing) to serve terms of four years, and for the thirteen-year-old throwing the sandbag to serve until he turned 21. However, she suspended those sentences in favor of brief terms in the Lucas County Youth Treatment Center in the hope that clemency would prepare them to go on to lead productive lives. Pedro Salinas drowned in a diving accident at a quarry shortly after being released in 2019.

=== Impact ===
As a result of this crime, fencing was installed along the overpass from which the sandbag was thrown to prevent future attacks. Furthermore, Ohio began to require fencing on highway overpasses to prevent deaths and injuries caused by youths throwing rocks at vehicles.

== See also ==
- List of homicides in Michigan
