= Darmstadt American rock-throwing incident =

2000 murders in Darmstadt, Germany

On 27 February 2000, three American teenagers threw rocks from a pedestrian bridge at vehicles moving on the B3 motorway in Darmstadt, Germany. The rocks struck six cars, killing two women, 41-year-old Katrin Rothermel and 20-year-old Sandra Ottmann, and injuring 17 others. The perpetrators, aged 14, 17, and 18 at the time of the attacks, were the children of U.S. Army soldiers stationed nearby. In December 2000, all three were convicted of first-degree murder in a German court and given sentences ranging from 7 to 8-and-a-half years in prison. After serving half of their sentences, the three were released early on good behavior and returned to the United States.

Der Spiegel described the rock-throwing incident as "the most severe crime committed by U.S. soldiers or their dependents in Germany".

== Incident ==
On the night of 27 February 2000, the three youths, ages 14, 17 and 18, confessed to throwing rocks at vehicles moving along the B3 motorway, saying that they had been "meeting regularly" for the past four to six weeks to throw rocks at cars. A fourth teenager (age 15) was questioned and released.

The teenagers left a bowling alley near their homes in Lincolnsiedlung, or Lincoln Village, at the time an off-base housing area for American military dependents, at about 9 pm. They carried a snow shovel and some rocks to a pedestrian bridge over the B3 motorway, where they climbed a 6–8 feet (1.8–2.4 m) plastic wall and began throwing rocks at passing cars. Finding that the rocks were not heavy enough to cause the cars to crash, they returned to an area near their school, where they found larger rocks, up to 18 pounds (8.2 kg) in weight, and carried them back to the highway where two of the boys handed the rocks to the third, who had climbed onto the wall.

They threw a 10-pound (4.5 kg) rock at a Mercedes-Benz driven by Karin Rothermel, 41, hitting her in the chest and killing her instantly. Sitting in the passenger seat, Rothermel's 75-year-old grandmother was critically injured, her 75-year-old grandfather in the backseat was slightly injured. At this point they moved to the other side of the bridge, and began hurling rocks at cars moving in the opposite direction, causing one car to crash as it swerved to avoid the rocks. The three then dropped an 18-pound (8.2 kg) stone onto a BMW driven by Sandra Ottmann, 20, who was driving her grandparents home from a meal celebrating her grandfather's birthday. The rock hit Ottmann in the head, killing her.

== Sentencing and release ==
The rock-throwers, aged 18, 17 and 14, were convicted of double murder and attempted murders in three cases and given terms of 8-and-a-half years, 8 years and 7 years in juvenile facilities; the 14-year-old was given seven years. As the 4th panel chamber of Germany's Federal Court of Justice discarded their appeal, the judgement became final on 10 July 2001.

The three were released early for good behavior and supposed to return to the United States after serving half of their sentences. While Wise was released in September 2003 and Griff in May 2004, Bissessar remained past the halfway point of his sentence to finish work on a painting course, so that he was released on the same day as Griff. The three returned to the United States.

== Aftermath ==
The bridge from where the rocks were thrown remained closed for two years.

On 30 June 2003, an American motorist alerted police to a group of four boys throwing egg-sized rocks from the same bridge in Darmstadt. The children, aged 5 to 9 and also American residents of Lincoln Village, were detained by German police as they were collecting more stones. No injuries were reported and the boys were released the same day. Teri Viedt, a spokesperson for Lincoln Village, stated that they "take every incident serious" since the 2000 murders, but also empasised that rock-throwing incidents were "not unique to Darmstadt" and that "German kids [elsewhere] do it, too".

== Reactions ==
- Secretary of Defense William Cohen said, in a statement issued by the American Embassy in Berlin, that he was "shocked and saddened" by the "tragic accident" and pledged to cooperate closely with German authorities in the investigation. He said that American thoughts and prayers were with the victims' families.
