= Murder of Julie Laible =

1999 murder of a professor due to rock throwing

- Date: March 28, 1999
- Location: Manatee County, Florida, United States; 27°34′28″N 82°30′53″W
- Type: Homicide
- Deaths: 1, Julie Laible
- Convicted: 3

Julie Catherine Laible (December 20, 1966 – March 28, 1999) was a professor at University of Alabama killed by a large rock thrown at her car from an overpass while she was driving along Interstate 75 in Manatee County, Florida, on March 28, 1999.

== Attack ==
A 22-pound (10 kg) rock was thrown or dropped onto a passing car from the Mendoza rd. overpass onto the southbound lanes of Interstate 75 near Bradenton, Florida by a group of four teenagers, hitting the car Laible was driving. Tara Wells (30), a graduate student who was a passenger in the car, managed to steer it safely to the side of the road. The rock smashed through the windshield hitting the professor in the head and inflicting a fatal injury. The teenagers also threw rocks at vehicles from the Erie Road overpass at Interstate 275 later that night. Several other cars were damaged by rocks thrown from the Erie Road Bridge overpass during that weekend.

Laible's death shocked Tuscaloosa, home of the University of Alabama, where the trials were followed closely. Laible was an assistant professor of Educational Leadership and Policy at University of Alabama from 1995 until her death in 1999. She is remembered for her anti-racism scholarship and activism.

== Trial and convictions ==
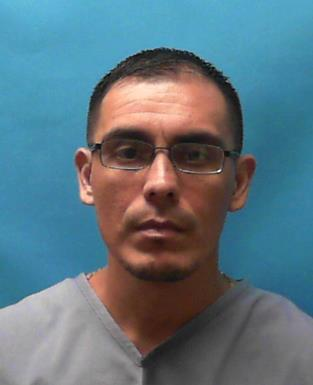
Jesus Dominguez

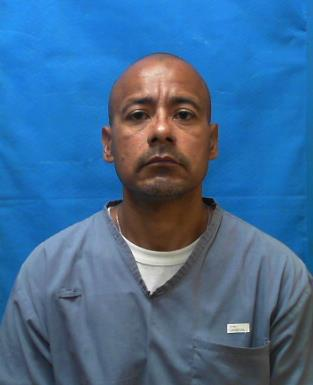
Juan Cardenas

Three of the four teenagers throwing rocks off the Erie Road Bridge overpass that night were arrested and charged. The fourth, Antonio Hernandez (19) was granted immunity by the court in exchange for his testimony.

Juan Cardenas (19) of Wimauma, Florida, the alleged ringleader in the crime, was convicted of second-degree murder for hurling the rock that killed Laible. Cardenas was sentenced to life imprisonment for second-degree murder.

Jesus Dominguez (19) of Ellenton, Florida, was charged with driving the truck in which Juan Cardenas and another boy (a juvenile at the time) rode on the night of the murder. During the 16 months following his arrest, Dominguez was permitted to move about freely wearing an ankle bracelet that recorded whether he was in his home or had left the house, but not his precise whereabouts. On August 30, 2000, the night before he was scheduled to plead guilty to second-degree murder, Dominguez fled. He was arrested in Brownsville, Texas in August 2001. Dominguez was extradited back to Manatee County. Dominguez pleaded no contest to a charge of second degree murder and driving the car on the night of the attack. Dominguez was sentenced to serve 21 years in prison.

A 16-year-old of Palmetto, Florida was tried as a juvenile. After spending 58 days in a juvenile detention facility, he was convicted of culpable negligence and sentenced to 180 days of house arrest.

== Victim ==
Laible, who grew up in Marshall County, Illinois, and earned her PhD at the University of Texas in 1995, was an assistant professor of education at the University of Alabama from 1995 until her death. Her work centered on finding ways to help minority youth, especially Mexican-Americans, to acquire the education and skills that lead to productive lives. Laible's ethics-centered approach to research, explored by K.C. Mansfield in a chapter entitled, The Potency of Love and the Power of a Thousand; Reflections on Gustav Mahler and Leadership of Social Justice, describing Laible's call to fellow researchers to examine their own attitudes, thoughts, feelings and intentions before entering a setting where they would conduct fieldwork.

Laible's 2002 paper, "A Loving Epistemology: What I Hold Critical in My Life, Faith, and Profession," was republished in Reconsidering Feminist Research in Educational Leadership, by Michelle D. Young and Linda Skrla, (State University of New York Press (2003), along with three chapters responding to Laible's ideas, "Life Lessons and a Loving Epistemology: A Response to Julie Laible’s Loving Epistemology," "Research on Women and Administration: A Response to Julie Laible’s Loving Epistemology ," and "The Emperor and Research on Women in School Leadership: A Response to Julie Laible’s Loving Epistemology."

An endowed lecture series, the Julie C. Laible Memorial Lecture Series on Anti-Racist Scholarship, Education and Social Activism, was created at the University of Alabama in Professor Laible's memory.

== Impact ==
The Florida Department of Transportation (FDOT) installed chain-link fences on highway overpasses in Manatee County, including the Erie Road overpass where Laible was killed. Statewide policy is to install such fences only on highly trafficked overpasses and those near schools.
