= Tanner Latham =

American writer and podcaster

Tanner Latham is a writer and podcaster from Alabama.

Latham is a graduate from the University of Alabama, where he studied English and theater. While at Alabama he performed in theater productions, but after graduation got a job as a travel writer and assistant travel editor for Southern Living, covering the southern United States: his job was described as "travel[ing] around the South and eat[ing] for a living". In 2009 he and fellow "Tales of the Road" writer Taylor Bruce won the bronze award in the Lowell Thomas Travel Journalism Competition, named for Lowell Thomas and awarded by the Society of American Travel Writers.

By 2011, he had left the magazine and become an independent writer (reporting for NPR affiliate WFAE's show Authentic South) and podcaster.
