= Janet Gurwitch =

American businesswoman and investor

CEO of Gurwitch Products
- In office 1996-2008

Personal details
- Born: 1954 (age 71–72) Hattiesburg, Mississippi, USA
- Education: University of Alabama
- Occupation: Businesswoman
- Known for: Founder of Gurwitch Products

Janet Gurwitch (born 1954) is an American businesswoman and investor. She is the founder of Gurwitch Products, the manufacturer of Laura Mercier Cosmetics. She founded the company in 1995 and launched the Laura Mercier line in March 1996.

== Biography ==
A native of Hattiesburg, Mississippi, United States, and graduate of the University of Alabama, Gurwitch began her career at Foley's department store in Houston, Texas, rising to the position of senior vice president of merchandising. She then moved to Neiman Marcus and served as the executive vice president from 1992 to 1995. As EVP, she was responsible for the merchandising strategy for all 35 stores.

She founded Gurwitch Products in 1996 in order to market a boutique line of cosmetics carrying the name of French make-up artist Laura Mercier. She sold Laura Mercier to Alticor in 2006 and remained CEO until 2008.

From 2009 to 2019, Gurwitch served on the boards of Drybar, Urban Decay, Tatcha, First Aid Beauty, La-Z-Boy and Dollar Shave Club.

From 2020 to 2024, Gurwitch was an operating partner at Advent International, a Boston-based private equity firm, where she served on the board of Olaplex a hair care products company. (NASDAQ: OLPX)

Gurwitch is currently an investor and board member of the Houston Astros baseball team.

Gurwitch was inducted into the Texas Business Hall of Fame in November 2023.

== In the media ==
- Interview on The BusinessMakers Show February 14, 2009.
- Panelist at the Milken Institute Global Conference, Building a Brand April 2018
