= Killing of Chris Currie =

2005 murder in New Zealand

Christopher Wayne Currie (1985 – 19 August 2005) was a 20-year-old apprentice in the building trades who was killed by a stone deliberately thrown at his car as he drove along a motorway near Auckland, New Zealand. His girlfriend and her two cousins who were in the car with him at the time of his death were injured but survived the assault.

== Rock-throwing incident ==
While Currie was driving a car along the Southern Motorway in Otahuhu, he was struck by an 8 kg block of concrete dropped from the Princes Street overbridge. The stone block smashed through the windscreen of Currie's car, struck his chin and then his chest. This fractured his sternum, which severed his heart's main artery and instantly killed him. The car then travelled another 120 metres down the motorway before striking a pole, causing minor injuries to the other three occupants of the car. Currie's girlfriend, Helen McCreadie, in the passenger seat, attempted to regain control of the car, but it crashed after 200 meters.

Shortly afterwards, 14-year-old Ngatai Rewiti was arrested and charged with murder and endangering transport.

There were a spate of "copycat" rock-throwing attacks in the immediate aftermath of the attack on Currie. Rocks thrown from highway overpasses is a recurring problem in New Zealand, as are rural roadside attacks on vehicles by organized groups of rock-throwers, and similar attacks on trains.

== Legal proceedings ==
Rewiti appeared in the Manukau Youth Court on 23 August. The murder trial began on 3 July 2006 at the Auckland High Court. Rewiti had name suppression and was identified only as "R" during the trial. The suppression was lifted after the verdict. Rewiti plead not guilty to the murder charge but admitted Currie's manslaughter. Crown Prosecutor Aaron Perkins told the jury that Rewiti did not need to have intended to kill Currie to commit murder. Under the Crimes Act 1961, death resulting from an unlawful act – in this case either an intention to cause him harm or to cause mayhem on the motorway – constitutes murder.

Among the prosecution witnesses were Currie's girlfriend who testified that all of a sudden the windscreen shattered and Currie looked like he had been knocked out. Friends of the accused said that on the Monday following the incident, he told them what he had done. One of the friends said that Rewiti sounded proud of his actions.

Rewiti was found not guilty of Currie's murder, but guilty of manslaughter on 6 July 2006. The jury took four hours to reach its not guilty verdict on the murder charge. Rewiti was remanded in custody and was sentenced on 6 September. The sentence, 4 years in a youth detention center, with possible parole, "outraged" Currie's family. His youth attracted press attention.

On 17 May 2009, Rewiti was released on parole, after serving three years and seven months of his four-year sentence.

=== Context ===
The youthful rock thrower, Ngatai Rewiti, is sometimes discussed in the context of New Zealand's difficulty dealing with broken families, youthful gang violence and street crime.
