= John P. Hermann =

American academic (born 1947)

John Patrick ("Pat") Hermann (born 17 April 1947) is an American academic who specializes in Old English poetry; he is an emeritus professor at the University of Alabama. He is the author of Allegories of War: Language and Violence in Old English Poetry (1989), and an early proponent of the application of postmodern critical theory to Old English poetry, especially allegorical poems, to investigate the "intersection of spirituality and violence". The book was marked as a "turning-point in criticism of Old English poetry". Hermann is also a well-known critic of the Greek system at the University of Alabama, described by one journal as leading a "one-man crusade...to abolish what he calls an 'apartheid greek system'".

== Biography ==
Hermann is a 1973 graduate of the University of Illinois, and became professor of Old English language and literature at the University of Alabama in 1974, where he spent his entire academic career. With his colleague John Burke he edited a volume on Geoffrey Chaucer, the proceedings of a 1977 conference held at the University of Alabama (Signs and Symbols in Chaucer's Poetry, 1981), and he wrote a monograph on spiritual warfare in religious Old English poetry (Allegories of War: Language and Violence in Old English Poetry, 1989). A former track athlete, he was an adjunct track coach for the university.

Hermann is also a well-known, longtime critic of the university's Greek system, which has drawn national attention for its long history of de facto segregation. Hermann considers the Greek system as profiting from "taxpayer-supported segregation". In 1991, he headed one of the committees charged with establishing an accreditation system for the university's fraternities and sororities; the new guidelines charged the organizations with helping to strive toward a more diverse campus, though Hermann's committee had called for stronger language: "white Greek chapters must admit black and international members and vice versa". By 2001, however, The Journal of Blacks in Higher Education concluded that the guidelines had achieved nothing, and that not a single black student had ever been accepted by a white fraternity or sorority (there had been "a few white members" in black fraternities, it noted). Hermann, disappointed by what he perceived as inaction on the part of university president Andrew Sorensen, was prepared to go to court in a civil suit, and called on the university that they demand that white Greek organizations "accept a black member or be told to leave the university grounds" (the article noted that the Greek houses occupy university-owned land, which they rented for $100 per year—an annual "fair market rental value" for the real estate would add up to $600,000). In 2002, he supported black student Melody Twilley in her attempt to join a white sorority (he did so in 1996 already, for two black students who in the end decided not to rush); she was twice denied and drew national attention for her efforts: "'She's bright, she's attractive, she's a member of the upper class,' Hermann says. In other words, someone whose exclusion could only be explained by race", wrote Jason Zengerle of The New Republic. Twilley was rejected by all fifteen sororities she applied to, to the dismay of Dean E. Culpepper Clark; Hermann commented, "Most students here are not racist at all...but now we're going to be seen as a racial disaster area".

=== Allegories of War ===
Allegories of War was Hermann's doctoral dissertation, and chapters of it were published as articles before the book was published by the University of Michigan Press in 1989. Taking the concept of psychomachia, "literature based on the premise of personified abstractions in combat", as a starting point, Hermann traces the reception of the Psychomachia by Prudentius and other allegorical texts in Old English literature, examining the influence of the tradition of spiritual warfare in various religious texts. The second part of the book subverts the traditional allegoresis as a standard method in Old English studies, and investigates how "spiritual violence...is complicitous with social violence" in such texts as Elene, Andreas, and Judith. Psychoanalysis and postmodern theory (including the work of Sigmund Freud and Jacques Lacan) are combined to bear on literary texts and the history that produced them. In Judith, for instance, Hermann reads the decapitation of Holofernes not just as a symbolic castration but also allegorically, as Christian abnegation of the self, but also tropologically, as signifying the disciplining of especially sexual desire within a group, a notion he relates to the poem's monastic provenance. Hermann's critique of "previous allegorical approaches" is still cited in Old English studies.

In addition, Hermann takes aim at the reigning methods in Old English scholarship of the time, especially exegesis and the New Criticism, by examining the "sublation", his translation of the Hegelian term Aufhebung, the "subsuming of one term in a binary pair (devil/church, foreign evil/soldier of Christ) by the other in an operation that both negates and conserves the former (suppressed) concept". One of the goals of his analysis is to uncover the literal violence sublated in the poetic accounts of spiritual warfare: "in Hermann's view, traditional exegetical and formalist readings have had the effect of obscuring a real (and reprehensible) commitment to violence and terror as instruments of forced cultural conversion in the early Middle Ages". This critical stance was taken within the profession as evidence that "the armies of modern critical theory stand at the gates of one of the last bastions of traditional philological discourse", in a book whose "discursive content is explicitly intended to serve a larger purpose—the dismantling of an established philological tradition which rests on the ideological alliance of modern exegesis and New Criticism".

The book received very mixed reviews. Joseph Harris, in a review for Speculum, was not convinced by its supposed "efforts at a high-level Marxist historical analysis" and thought its deconstructionist theme "least satisfactory". Martin Irvine, in the South Atlantic Review, called it "an important contribution to current discussions of theory and method in Old English studies", to be read "profitably alongside other recent studies on Old English literature and critical practices by scholars such as Gillian Overing and Allen Frantzen".
