= Laura Mercier =

French makeup artist and businesswoman (born 1960)

- Born: Michèle Mercier; October 2, 1960 (age 65); Arles, France
- Occupation: Makeup artist
- Known for: Makeup, photoshoots

Laura Mercier (born Michèle Mercier on 2 October 1960) is a French makeup artist and businesswoman.

== Early life ==
Laura Mercier was born as Michèle Mercier in Arles, France, on 2 October 1960, the youngest of three daughters. At 16, she enrolled as an art student at L'Ecole Supérieure d'Arts Appliqués Duperré, a design school in Paris, to pursue painting and drawing. Mercier later enrolled at the Carita Paris Institute, a combination beauty school and salon in Paris, France. Following her graduation, Mercier worked as a makeup artist at the school and adopted the name "Laura" to avoid confusion with the actress Michèle Mercier, a client of the salon. After attending Carita Paris Institute, she moved to New York and worked for famous magazines such as Elle, Allure, Glamour, and InStyle.

== Career ==
Mercier moved from Paris to New York City in 1985 to work as a makeup artist at the American edition of Elle magazine. Mercier was hired as Madonna's personal makeup artist, following a photo shoot featuring Madonna for Vogue magazine. Mercier also worked on campaigns for magazines and clients including The Gap and Chanel. Other celebrity clients Mercier has worked with include Julia Roberts, Mariah Carey and Sarah Jessica Parker.

In 1996, Janet Gurwitch, the former Executive Vice President of Neiman Marcus, founded Laura Mercier Cosmetics with her partner, Gary Kusin. The company's philosophy focuses on what it calls the "flawless face", allegedly derived from Mercier's promotion of natural-looking makeup. The company asserts that this idea guides the development and presentation of its products. That year was the launching of Mercier's own cosmetics range.

Mercier continues to work as a freelance makeup artist and is a published author. In 2006, she published The New Beauty Secrets: Your Ultimate Guide to a Flawless Face.

On 23 March 2014 she joined with Claudia Poccia for the ovarian cancer Awareness Month and donated some of her savings to the Ovarian Cancer Research Alliance. In April 2014 she launched a new collection called New Attitude.
