= Prasad Gogineni =

American engineer

Sivaprasad "Prasad" Gogineni is an American engineer, currently the Cudworth Professor of Engineering at University of Alabama and formerly the Deane E. Ackers Distinguished Professor at University of Kansas.
