= Laura Mercier Cosmetics =

French and American company

- Company type: Subsidiary
- Industry: Personal care
- Founded: 1996
- Founder: Laura Mercier
- Key people: Diane H. Kim, President
- Products: Cosmetics and skin care
- Parent: Orveon Global Ltd
- Website: lauramercier.com

Laura Mercier Cosmetics is a French and American cosmetics and skin care line that was founded in 1996 by celebrity makeup artist Laura Mercier.

== History ==
Mercier teamed up with Janet Gurwitch in 1996 to launch the cosmetics line. Laura Mercier remains active in the brand, deeply involved in the product development and creative direction of the brand.

The company was acquired by Alticor in 2006 and later by Shiseido Americas Corp. in 2016, though Mercier remained closely involved throughout both transitions.

== Products ==
From the outset, Laura Mercier Cosmetic's goal was to offer "high-quality, natural-looking makeup products for all skin tones and types", according to the Wall Street Journal. The brand became known for its focus on products to create what it calls the "flawless face", a concept derived from Mercier's reputation for promoting naturalistic makeup. In 2012, it became the official cosmetics brand of the second season of Project Runway All Stars.
