= Ira B. Thompson =

American politician

- Thompson cropped from the 1947 composite members photo of the Alabama House of Representatives

Member of the Alabama House of Representatives from the Crenshaw County district
- In office 1943–1951
- Preceded by: Walter Lee Petrey
- Succeeded by: Vernon Shelley Summerlin

Member of the Alabama House of Representatives from the Baldwin County district
- In office 1915

Personal details
- Born: Ira Bowman Thompson; April 9, 1889 Bay Minette, Alabama
- Died: August 10, 1973 (aged 84) Luverne, Alabama
- Party: Democratic
- Other political affiliations: Ku Klux Klan (1920s)
- Spouse: Eugenia Marie Little (m. 1917)
- Children: Mary Eugenia

Military service
- Allegiance: United States
- Branch/service: United States National Guard
- Years of service: c. late 1910s, c. early 1940s
- Rank: Captain
- Battles/wars: World War I World War II

Ira Bowman Thompson (April 9, 1889 – August 10, 1973) was a politician, Ku Klux Klan leader, and attorney from the U.S. state of Alabama.

Thompson was born to Albert and Laura (née Crabtree) Thompson at Bay Minette, Alabama in 1889. After attending school in Bay Minette, Thompson attended the University of Alabama and Meridian College in Mississippi, graduating from the latter in 1910. Thompson then entered into military service, eventually becoming Captain of Company B of the 1st Alabama Infantry in 1915. He also served a brief term in the Alabama House of Representatives as a representative for Baldwin County in that same year. He was admitted to the bar in 1916 but he was quickly called into federal military service in 1917 when he was sent to France in 1918 to command a Prisoner of War camp until the prisoners were repatriated back to Germany in 1919. After his return to the United States, Thompson opened a law practice in Luverne, Alabama and arranged Battery A of the 141st Field Artillery in the National Guard, which he would later resign from in 1932.

Thompson was an active member of the local Ku Klux Klan organization in Crenshaw County and Luverne in the late 1920s, serving as the exalted cyclops of the Crenshaw KKK around 1927 and 1928. In October 1927, Thompson, along with 35 other suspected Klansmen were all indicted by the Crenshaw County grand jury on the basis of their participation of floggings throughout the county. The case, however was dropped later in December by the attorney general's withdrawal on his belief that the state police had assisted the Klan. Less than a year after Thompson's indictment, Governor Bibb Graves appointed him the prosecuting attorney of Crenshaw County.

In 1927, Thompson was appointed solicitor of Luverne, and was re-elected to two more consecutive terms in 1928 and 1932. He was called back to active military service in 1942 when he was a captain in the military police corps. He had previously served as the attorney for Crenshaw County since 1941. He sat once again in the Alabama House of Representatives, this time for Crenshaw County as a Democrat from 1943 until 1951.

Thompson married Eugenia Marie Little in 1917. They had one child, Mary Eugenia. He was an active community member, sitting on the state athletic commission, Luverne's education board, founding the Luverne Bank and Trust Company, and serving as a member of the local Lion's Club, Red Cross and American Legion. He also taught Sunday school at his church for over 30 years. He died in 1973 in Luverne.
