= Randy =

- Pronunciation: /ˈrændi/ RAN-dee
- Gender: Unisex (mostly male)
- Language: English

Other gender
- Feminine: Randi

Origin
- Languages: English, Latin
- Origin: 1. Randall; 2. Randolph; 3. Miranda
- Meaning: Diminutive form of Randall, Randolph, and Miranda.
- Region of origin: English-speaking world

Other names
- Variant form: Randi
- Related names: Randall, Randolph, Miranda, Bertrand

Randy is a primarily masculine given name. It is popular in the United States and Canada. It was originally derived from the names Randall, Randolph, and Miranda, and may be a short form (hypocorism) of them.

Randi is approximately the feminine equivalent of Randy.

The word has sexual connotations in British English, typically meaning a sexually aroused or excited person.

== Men with the given name ==
=== A ===
- Randy Abbey (born 1974), Ghanaian media personality
- Randy Adler (??–2016), American bishop
- Randy Allen (disambiguation), multiple people
- Randy Ambrosie (born 1963), Canadian sports executive
- Randy Anderson (1959–2002), American wrestling referee
- Randy Angst, American politician
- Randy Armstrong (disambiguation), multiple people
- Randy Arozarena (born 1995), Cuban baseball player
- Randy Asadoor (born 1962), American baseball player
- Randy Atcher (1918–2002), American television personality
- Randy Avent, American electrical engineer
- Randy Avon (born 1940), American politician
- Randy Awrey (born 1956), American football coach
- Randy Ayers (born 1956), American basketball coach

=== B ===
- Randy Babbitt (born 1946), American businessman and politician
- Randy Bachman (born 1943), Canadian musician
- Randy Baker (born 1958), American stock car racer
- Randy Baldwin (born 1967), American football player
- Randy Ball (American football) (born 1951), American football coach
- Randy Barceló (1946–1994), Cuban dancer
- Randy Barlow (1943–2020), American singer
- Randy Barnes (born 1966), American shot putter
- Randy Barnett (born 1952), American lawyer
- Randy Barth, American educational entrepreneur
- Randy Bartz (born 1968), American speed skater
- Randy Baruh (born 1995), Malaysian footballer
- Randy Bates (born 1960), American football coach
- Randy Baumann (born 1972), American radio personality
- Randy Baumgardner (born 1956), American politician
- Randy Beardy (born 1994), Canadian football player
- Randy Becker (racing driver) (born 1952), American racing driver
- Randy Beisler (born 1944), American football player
- Randy Bell, American musician
- Randy Bennett (disambiguation), multiple people
- Randy Bernard (born 1967), American race car manager
- Randy Bernsen (born 1954), American guitarist
- Randy W. Berry (born 1965), American diplomat
- Randy Best, American entrepreneur
- Randy Bettis (born 1959), American disc jockey
- Randy Beverly (born 1944), American football player
- Randy Beverly Jr. (born 1966), American football coach
- Randy Bish, American cartoonist
- Randy Black (born 1963), Canadian rock drummer
- Randy Blair, American actor
- Randy Blake (born 1986), American kickboxer
- Randy Blumer (born 1958), American poker player
- Randy Blythe (born 1971), American singer-songwriter
- Randy Bobb (1948–1982), American baseball player
- Randy Bockus (born 1960), American baseball player
- Randy Boehning (born 1962), American politician
- Randy Boissonnault (born 1970), Canadian politician
- Randy Bolden (born 1976), American basketball coach
- Randy Boone (1942–2025), American actor
- Randy Borum, American professor
- Randy L. Bott (born 1945), American religious professor
- Randy Boudreaux, American songwriter
- Randy Boyagoda (born 1976), Canadian writer
- Randy Boyd (disambiguation), multiple people
- Randy Bradbury (born 1964), American guitarist
- Randy Brecker (born 1945), American musician
- Randy Breuer (born 1960), American basketball player
- Randy Bridges, American politician
- Randy Briggs (born 1965), American stock car racer
- Randy Brinson (born 1957), American physician
- Randy Brock (born 1943), American politician
- Randy Brodehl (born 1954), American businessman
- Randy Brooks (disambiguation), multiple people
- Randy Brown (disambiguation), multiple people
- Randy Bryden (born 1970), Canadian curler
- Randy Buckner (born 1970), American neuroscientist
- Randy Bucyk (born 1962), Canadian ice hockey player
- Randy Buehler (born 1971), American video game developer
- Randy Bullock (born 1989), American football player
- Randy Burchell (born 1955), Canadian ice hockey player
- Randy Burckhard (born 1952), American politician
- Randy Burke (1955–2025), American football player
- Randy Burns (singer) (born 1948), American singer-songwriter
- Randy Burns, American music producer
- Randy Burridge (born 1966), Canadian ice hockey player
- Randy Bush (born 1958), American baseball player
- Randy Bush (scientist), American scientist
- Randy Byers (born 1964), American baseball player

=== C ===
- Randy Caballero (born 1990), Nicaraguan-American boxer
- Randy Cain (1945–2009), American singer
- Randy California (1951–1997), American guitarist
- Randy Campbell (born 1960), American football player
- Randy Carlyle (born 1956), Canadian ice hockey player and coach
- Randy Carr (1956–2002), American musician
- Randy Cartwright (born 1951), American animator
- Randy Cassingham (born 1959), American columnist
- Randy Castillo (1950–2002), American drummer
- Randy Castillo (dancer) (born 1982), American ballet dancer
- Randy Channell Soei, Canadian tea master
- Randy Charlton (born 1999), American football player
- Randy Chartier (born 1957), American horse trainer
- Randy Chestnut (born 1971), American comedian
- Randy Chevrier (born 1976), Canadian football player
- Randy Chirino (born 1996), Costa Rican footballer
- Randy Choate (born 1975), American baseball player
- Randy Churchill (born 1960), Canadian stock car racer
- Randy Ciarlante, American musician
- Randy Clark (disambiguation), multiple people
- Randy Clay (1928–2006), American football player
- Randy Cohen, American writer
- Randy Collins (born 2001), Japanese fashion designer
- Randy W. Collins (born 1946), Canadian pharmacist
- Randy Cooper (born 1967), American guitarist
- Randy Corman (born 1960), American politician
- Randy Cornor (1954–2022), American singer
- Randy Costa (born 1994), American mixed martial artist
- Randy Couture (born 1963), American mixed martial artist
- Randy Crane (born 1965), American judge
- Randy Crawford (tennis) (born 1955), American tennis player
- Randy Credico (born 1954), American activist
- Randy B. Crites (born 1962), American naval officer
- Randy Cross (born 1954), American football player
- Randy Crouch (born 1952), American instrumentalist
- Randy Crowder (born 1952), American football player
- Randy Culpepper (born 1989), American basketball player
- Randy Cunneyworth (born 1961), Canadian ice hockey player
- Randy Cuthbert (born 1970), American football player

=== D ===
- Randy Daniels (born 1950), American businessman and politician
- Randy Darling (born 1957), American curler
- Randy David (born 1956), Filipino journalist
- Randy Davis (born 1952), American politician
- Randy Davison (born 1971), American actor
- Randy Dean (born 1955), American football player
- Randy DeBarge (born 1958), American musician
- Randy Dedini (born 1970), American soccer player
- Randy Degg (born 1984), American football player
- Randy Delorey, Canadian politician
- Randy Demmer (born 1957), American politician
- Randy Denton (born 1949), American basketball player
- Randy de Puniet (born 1981), French motorcycle racer
- Randy Dickens, American football coach
- Randy Dickison (??–1996), American diver
- Randy Dixon (born 1965), American football player
- Randy Dobnak (born 1995), American baseball player
- Randy Dorman, American Paralympic athlete
- Randy Dorn (born 1953), American politician
- Randy Dorton (1954–2004), American engine builder
- Randy Druz (born 1958), American tennis player
- Randy DuBurke (born 1962), American illustrator
- Randy Duck (born 1975), American basketball player
- Randy Duncan (1937–2016), American football player and lawyer
- Randy Dunn, American academic administrator
- Randy D. Dunn, American politician
- Randy Dutiaume, Canadian curler
- Randy Dwumfour (born 2000), Ghanaian footballer

=== E ===
- Randy Edelman (born 1947), American musician
- Randy Edmunds (disambiguation), multiple people
- Randy Edsall (born 1958), American football coach
- Randy Edwards (born 1961), American football player
- Randy Edwini-Bonsu (born 1990), Canadian soccer player
- Randy Elliott (born 1951), American baseball player
- Randy Ellis, Canadian engineer
- Randy Emberlin, American illustrator
- Randy Charles Epping (born 1952), American author
- Randy Espinosa (born 1988), Guatemalan footballer
- Randy Evans (born 1958), American lawyer
- Randy Ewers (born 1968), American politician
- Randy Exelby (born 1965), Canadian ice hockey player

=== F ===
- Randy Fabi (born 1963), Canadian football player
- Randy Falco (born 1953), American media executive
- Randy Farmer (born 1961), American game developer
- Randy Fasani (born 1978), American football player
- Randy Feenstra (born 1969), American politician
- Randy Fenoli (born 1964), American television presenter
- Randy Fichtner (born 1963), American football coach
- Randy Findell (born 2001), American Musician
- Randy Fine (born 1974), American politician
- Randy Fischer (born 1951), American politician
- Randy Fontanez (born 1989), American baseball player
- Randy Forbes (born 1952), American politician
- Randy Foye (born 1983), American basketball player
- Randy Flanagan (born 1960), Canadian neuroscientist
- Randy Flores (born 1975), American baseball player and scout
- Randy Florke, American real estate agent
- Randy Freer (born 1959/1960), American television executive
- Randy Frese, American politician
- Randy Friese (born 1964), American politician
- Randy Frye (born 1955), American politician
- Randy Fuller (disambiguation), multiple people
- Randy Fullmer (1950–2023), American businessman

=== G ===
- Randy Paul Gage (born 1959), American author
- Randy Galloway (born 1943), American sports columnist
- Randy Gane (born 1959), American keyboardist
- Randy Garber (disambiguation), multiple people
- Randy Gardner (disambiguation), multiple people
- Randy Gatewood (born 1973), American football player
- Randy Gay (born 1958), American serial killer
- Randy Gazzola (born 1993), Canadian ice hockey player
- Randy Gelispie, American percussionist
- Randy George (born 1964), American army lieutenant general
- Randy Gilhen (born 1963), German-Canadian ice hockey player
- Randy Gingera (born 1968), Canadian volleyball player
- Randy Glasbergen (1957–2015), American cartoonist
- Randy Glass, American con man
- Randy Glover (born 1941), American golfer
- Randy Gomez (born 1957), American baseball player
- Randy Goodrum (born 1947), American songwriter
- Randy J. Goodwin (born 1967), American actor
- Randy Gordon (disambiguation), multiple people
- Randy Gradishar (born 1952), American football player
- Randy Graf (born 1957), American politician
- Randy Grau (born 1975), American politician
- Randy Greenawalt (1949–1997), American serial killer
- Randy Gregg (disambiguation), multiple people
- Randy Gregory (born 1992), American football player
- Randy Gregson (1918–2010), American tennis player
- Randy Greif (born 1957), American composer
- Randy Griffin (born 1976), American boxer
- Randy Grimes (born 1960), American football player
- Randy Gross, American politician
- Randy Grossman (born 1952), American football player
- Randy Gumpert (1918–2008), American baseball player
- Randy Guss (born 1967), American musician

=== H ===
- Randy Hahn (born 1958), American sports commentator
- Randy Halasan (born 1982), Filipino teacher
- Randy Halberstadt (born 1953), American pianist
- Randy Hall (born 1960), American singer
- Randy Hansen (born 1954), American guitarist
- Randy Hanson (born 1968), American football coach
- Randy Harrison (born 1977), American actor
- Randy Hart (born 1948), American football player and coach
- Randy Hawes (born 1947), Canadian politician
- Randy Haykin, American entrepreneur
- Randy Heath (born 1964), Canadian ice hockey player
- Randy Heckenkemper (born 1958), American golf course architect
- Randy Hedberg (born 1954), American football coach
- Randy Heflin (1918–1999), American baseball player
- Randy Heisler (born 1961), American discus thrower
- Randy Henderson (writer), American writer
- Randy Henderson (politician) (born 1956), American politician
- Randy Hendricks (born 1945), American attorney
- Randy Hill (born 1967), American entrepreneur
- Randy Hilliard (born 1967), American football player
- Randy Hillier (politician) (born 1958), Canadian politician
- Randy Hillier (ice hockey) (born 1960), Canadian ice hockey player
- Randy Hippeard (born 1985), American football player
- Randy Hoback (born 1967), Canadian politician
- Randy Jo Hobbs (1948–1993), American musician
- Randy Hoffman (born 1952), American athletic administrator
- Randy Hogan (disambiguation), multiple people
- Randy Holcomb (born 1979), Libyan-American basketball player
- Randy Holden (born 1945), American guitarist
- Randy Holland (born 1951), Canadian poker player
- Randy J. Holland (1947–2022), American judge
- Randy Holloway (born 1955), American football player
- Randy Holt (born 1953), Canadian ice hockey player
- Randy Hood (born 1968), American baseball coach
- Randy Hopper (born 1966), American politician
- Randy Horton (born 1945), American soccer player
- Randy Houser (born 1975), American singer-songwriter
- Randy Howard (disambiguation), multiple people
- Randy Hughes (born 1953), American football player
- Randy Hultgren (born 1966), American politician
- Randy Hundley (born 1942), American baseball player
- Randy Hunt (disambiguation), multiple people
- Randy Hutchison (born 1948), American stock car racer
- Randy Hymes (born 1979), American football player

=== I ===
- Randy Ireland (born 1957), Canadian ice hockey player
- Randy Iwase (born 1947), American politician

=== J ===
- Randy Jackson (disambiguation), multiple people
- Randy Jayne (born 1944), American military officer
- Randy Jessup (born 1960/1961), American politician
- Randy Johnson (disambiguation), multiple people
- Randy Johnston (disambiguation), multiple people
- Randy Jones (disambiguation), multiple people
- Randy Jordan (born 1970), American football player and coach
- Randy Josselyn (born 1974), American actor
- Randy Jirtle (born 1947), American biologist
- Randy Jurgensen (born 1933), American detective

=== K ===
- Randy Kamp (born 1953), Canadian politician
- Randy P. Kamrath (born 1954), American politician
- Randy Kaplan, American songwriter
- Randy Karraker (born 1962), American sportscaster
- Randy Katz, American professor
- Randy Kehler (born 1944), American activist
- Randy Keisler (born 1976), American baseball player
- Randy Kelly (born 1950), American politician
- Randy Kerber (born 1958), American composer
- Randy Kerbow (born 1940), American football player
- Randy Kinder (born 1975), American football player
- Randy Kirk (born 1964), American football player
- Randy Kirner (born 1946), American politician
- Randy Klein (born 1949), American musician
- Randy Knorr (born 1968), American baseball player
- Randy Kohrs, American instrumentalist
- Randy Komisar, American attorney
- Randy Kraft (born 1945), American serial killer
- Randy Kramer (born 1960), American baseball player
- Randy Krummenacher (born 1990), Swiss motorcycle racer
- Randy Kuhl (born 1943), American politician
- Randy Kutcher (born 1960), American baseball player

=== L ===
- Randy Ladouceur (born 1960), Canadian ice hockey player and coach
- Randy Laine (born 1952), American surfer
- Randy LaJoie (born 1961), American race car driver
- Randy Lane (born 1967), American artistic gymnast
- Randy Lanier (born 1954), American race car driver
- Randy LaPolla, Australian researcher
- Randy Laverty (born 1953), American politician
- Randy Law, American politician
- Randy Leen (born 1975), American golfer
- Randy Legge (born 1945), Canadian ice hockey player
- Randy Lemm, American politician
- Randy Lennox, Canadian media executive
- Randy Leonard (born 1952), American politician
- Randy Lerch (born 1954), American baseball player
- Randy Lerner (born 1962), American investor
- Randy Lerú (born 1995), Cuban artistic gymnast
- Randy Levine (born 1955), American attorney
- Randy Lew (born 1985), American poker player
- Randy Lewis (disambiguation), multiple people
- Randy Ligon, American politician
- Randy Lipscher (born 1960), American ice hockey player
- Randy Livingston (born 1975), American basketball player
- Randy Logan (born 1951), American football player
- Randy Love (born 1956), American football player
- Randy Lyness (born 1951), American politician

=== M ===
- Randy MacDonald (born 1962), Canadian stock car racer
- Randy MacGregor (born 1953), Canadian ice hockey player
- Randy L. Maddox (born 1953), American theologian
- Randy Maggard (born 1963), American politician
- Randy Mamola (born 1959), American motorcycle racer
- Randy Manery (born 1949), Canadian ice hockey player
- Randy Mann, American soccer player
- Randy Marsh (1949–2008), American baseball umpire
- Randy Marshall (born 1946), American football player
- Randy Martin (1957–2015), American art professor
- Randy Martz (born 1956), American baseball player
- Randy Matson (born 1945), American track and field athlete
- Randy Matthews (born 1950), American singer
- Randy Mattingly (born 1951), American football player
- Randy Mavinga (born 2000), French footballer
- Randy Mazey (born 1966), American baseball coach
- Randy McAllister, American drummer
- Randy McCown (born 1977), American football player
- Randy McDaniel (born 1967), American politician
- Randy McEachern (born 1955), American football player
- Randy McGilberry (born 1980), American baseball player
- Randy McKay (born 1967), Canadian ice hockey player
- Randy McKellar (1962–1999), Canadian rugby union player
- Randy McMichael (born 1979), American football player
- Randy McMillan (1958–2026), American football player
- Randy McNally (born 1944), American politician
- Randy Mearns (born 1969), American lacrosse player
- Randy Meier, American news anchor
- Randy Meisner (1946–2023), American musician
- Randy Melvin (born 1959), American football coach
- Randy Merkel (born 1976), American soccer player
- Randy Merrill, American engineer
- Randy Merriman (1911–2005), American television producer
- Randy Messenger (born 1981), American baseball player
- Randy Miller (disambiguation), multiple people
- Randy Milligan (born 1961), American baseball player
- Randy Minchew (born 1957), American politician
- Randy Minkoff, American corporate executive
- Randy Minniear (born 1943), American football player
- Randy Mitton (born 1950), Canadian ice hockey player
- Randy Moffett (born 1947), American academic administrator
- Randy Moffitt (born 1948), American baseball player
- Randy Moller (born 1963), Canadian ice hockey player
- Randy Monroe (born 1962), American basketball coach
- Randy Montana (born 1985), American singer
- Randy Montgomery (born 1947), American football player
- Randy Moore (1906–1992), American baseball player
- Randy Moore (forester), American scientist
- Randy Charles Morin (born 1969), Canadian author
- Randy Moss (born 1977), American football player
- Randy Murray, Canadian guitarist
- Randy Murray (ice hockey) (born 1945), Canadian ice hockey player
- Randy Myers (born 1962), American baseball player
- Randy Myers (animator) (born 1967), American animator

=== N ===
- Randy J. Nelson, American neuroscientist
- Randy Neufeld (curler) (born 1962), Canadian curler
- Randy Neugebauer (born 1949), American politician
- Randy Neumann (born 1948), American boxer
- Randy Newman (born 1943), American singer-songwriter
- Randy Niemann (born 1955), American baseball player and coach
- Randy Nix (born 1956), American politician
- Randy Nixon (born 1960), American tennis player
- Randy Norton, American basketball coach
- Randy Nosek (born 1967), American baseball player
- Randy Nteka (born 1997), French footballer

=== O ===
- Randy Emeka Obi (born 1999), Japanese footballer
- Randy Oda (born 1953), American musician
- Randy Oglesby (born 1949), American actor
- Randy Olson (born 1955), American biologist
- Randy Onuoha (born 1994), Dutch footballer
- Randy Orton (born 1980), American professional wrestler
- Randy Osburn (born 1952), Canadian ice hockey player
- Randy Owen (born 1949), American singer
- Randy Owens (1959–2015), American basketball player

=== Q ===
- Randy Quaid (born 1950), American actor

=== P ===
- Randy Palmer (born 1975), American football player
- Randy Pangalila (born 1990), Indonesian actor
- Randy Parsons (born 1965), American instrument maker
- Randy Parton (1953–2021), American singer-songwriter
- Randy Paul (1960–2020), American actor and model
- Randy Pausch (1960–2008), American computer scientist
- Randy Pedersen (1962–2026), American bowler
- Randy Peele (born 1957), American basketball coach
- Randy Petalcorin (born 1991), Filipino boxer
- Randy Pettapiece (born 1949), Canadian politician
- Randy Pfund (born 1951), American basketball coach
- Randy Phillips (disambiguation), multiple people
- Randy Pierce (disambiguation), multiple people
- Randy Pieterse (born 1956), South African politician
- Randy Pietzman (born 1961), American politician
- Randy Pike (1953–2014), American politician
- Randy Pikuzinski (born 1965), American soccer player
- Randy Piper (born 1953), American guitarist
- Randy Pippin (born 1963), American football coach
- Randy Pitchford (born 1971), American businessman
- Randy Pobst (born 1957), American race car driver
- Randy Poffo (1952–2011), American professional wrestler
- Randy Poltl (born 1952), American football player
- Randy Porter (born 1964), American stock car racer
- Randy Post (born 1968), American illustrator
- Randy Powell (politician), American politician
- Randy Prescott (born 1964), American soccer player
- Randy Price (born 1957), American politician
- Randy Primas (1949–2012), American politician

=== R ===
- Randy Ragan (born 1959), Canadian soccer player
- Randy Railsback, American politician
- Randy Rainbow (born 1981), American comedian
- Randy Raine-Reusch (born 1952), Canadian composer
- Randy Rampage (1960–2018), Canadian musician
- Randy Ramsey (born 1995), American football player
- Randy Randleman (born 1954), American politician
- Randy Rasmussen (disambiguation), multiple people
- Randy Read (born 1957), Canadian researcher
- Randy Ready (born 1960), American baseball player and coach
- Randy Redroad, American filmmaker
- Randy Reese (born 1946), American swimming coach
- Randy Reeves (born 1962), American military officer
- Randy Reinholz (born 1961), American native playwright
- Randy Renfrow (born 1958), American race car driver
- Randy Reutershan (born 1955), American football player
- Randy Revelle (1941–2018), American politician
- Randy Rhino (born 1953), American football player
- Randy Ribay, American writer
- Randy Rich (born 1953), American football player
- Randy Richards (born 1991), Jamaican-American football player
- Randy Richardville (born 1959), American politician
- Randy Rigby, American basketball executive
- Randy Rinks (born 1954), American businessman
- Randy Rhoads (1956–1982), American guitarist
- Randy Roach, American politician
- Randy Robbins (disambiguation), multiple people
- Randy Robertson (politician) (born 1962), American politician
- Randy Robitaille (born 1975), Canadian hockey player
- Randy Rodríguez (born 1999), Dominican baseball player
- Randy Rogers (football manager), Bahamian football manager
- Randy Rolle, Bahamian politician
- Randy Romero (1957–2019), American jockey
- Randy Rosario (born 1994), Dominican baseball player
- Randy Rose (born 1956), American professional wrestler
- Randy Rose (musician), American musician
- Randy Rota (born 1950), Canadian ice hockey player
- Randy Roth (born 1954), American convicted murderer
- Randy Roth (ice hockey) (born 1952), Canadian ice hockey player
- Randy Rowe (born 1980), Canadian ice hockey player
- Randy Ruiz (born 1977), American baseball player
- Randy Rushing, American politician
- Randy Rustenberg (born 1984), Dutch footballer
- Randy Rutherford (born 1971), American basketball coach
- Randy Ryan, American actor

=== S ===
- Randy Saaf, American gaming executive
- Randy Sabien (born 1956), American violinist
- Randy Sageman (born 1960), Canadian diver
- Randy Salerno (1963–2008), American news anchor
- Randy Samuel (born 1963), Trinidadian-Canadian soccer player
- Randy Sanders (born 1965), American football coach
- Randy Sandke (born 1949), American trumpeter
- Randy Santana (born 1983), Mexican footballer
- Randy Santiago (born 1960), Filipino actor and musician
- Randy Savage (1952–2011), American professional wrestler
- Randy Scarbery (born 1952), American baseball player
- Randy Scheunemann (born 1960), American lobbyist
- Randy Schleusener (born 1957), American football player
- Randy Schneider (born 2001), Swiss footballer
- Randy Schobinger (born 1969), American politician
- Randy Schultz (1943–1996), American football player
- Randy Schwartz (born 1944), American baseball player
- Randy Scott (disambiguation), multiple people
- Randy Scruggs (1953–2018), American music producer
- Randy Seeley, American medical academic
- Randy Seiler (1946–2023), American attorney
- Randy Sellers (born 1962), American man who has been missing since 1980
- Randy J. Shams, American guitarist
- Randy Shannon (born 1966), American football coach
- Randy Sharp, American singer-songwriter
- Randy Shilts (1951–1994), American journalist
- Randy Shughart (1958–1993), American soldier
- Randy Shumway (born 1971), American businessman
- Randy Sidler (born 1956), American football player
- Randy Simms, Canadian politician
- Randy H. Skinner (born 1957), American consultant
- Randy Skretvedt (born 1958), American film scholar
- Randy Slaugh (born 1987), American music producer
- Randy Smith (disambiguation), multiple people
- Randy Smyth (born 1954), American sailor
- Randy Snow (1959–2009), American tennis player
- Randy Soderman (born 1974), American soccer player
- Randy Sosin (born 1962), American film producer
- Randy Souders (born 1954), American artist
- Randy Sparks (born 1933), American musician
- Randy Spears (born 1961), American pornographic actor
- Randy Spelling (born 1978), American actor
- Randy Spendlove, American record producer
- Randy Spetman (born 1952), American athletic administrator
- Randy Stair (1992–2017), American mass murderer
- Randy Starkman (1960–2012), Canadian sports journalist
- Randy Starks (born 1983), American football player
- Randy Staten (1944–2020), American politician and football player
- Randy Staub, Canadian recording engineer
- Randy St. Claire (born 1960), American baseball coach
- Randy Steffes, Canadian musician
- Randy Stein (1953–2011), American baseball player
- Randy Sterling (born 1951), American baseball player
- Randy Stevenson (born 1968), American political scientist
- Randy Stewart (born 1951), American sports shooter
- Randy Stoklos (born 1960), American beach volleyball player
- Randy Stoll (born 1945), American basketball player
- Randy Stoltmann (1962–1994), Canadian outdoorsman
- Randy Stone (1958–2007), American actor
- Randy Stonehill (born 1952), American singer-songwriter
- Randy Stradley (born 1956), American writer
- Randy Stumpfhauser (born 1977), American motocross racer
- Randy Suess (1945–2019), American software developer
- Randy Swartzmiller (born 1960), American politician
- Randy Sweeney (born 1956), American research scientist

=== T ===
- Randy Tate (born 1965), American politician
- Randy Tate (baseball) (1952–2021), American baseball player
- Randy Terbush, American health executive
- Randy Thom (born 1951), American sound designer
- Randy Thomas (disambiguation), multiple people
- Randy Thornhill (born 1944), American biologist
- Randy Thornton (born 1964), American football player
- Randy Thorsteinson (born 1956), Canadian politician
- Randy Terrill (born 1969), American politician
- Randy Tissot (1944–2013), American stock car racing driver
- Randy Tolsma (born 1966), American stock car racer
- Randy Tomlin (born 1966), American baseball player
- Randy Torres, American guitarist
- Randy Trautman (1960–2014), American football player
- Randy Travis (born 1959), American singer
- Randy Tribble, American football coach
- Randy Truitt, American politician
- Randy Turnbull (born 1962), Canadian ice hockey player
- Randy Turner (1949–2005), American singer
- Randy Tyree (born 1940), American politician

=== U ===
- Randy Udell (born 1961), American telecommunications engineer and Democratic politician

=== V ===
- Randy Valiente, Filipino comic book artist
- Randy Vancourt, Canadian composer
- Randy Van Divier (born 1958), American football player
- Randy VanWarmer (1955–2004), American singer-songwriter
- Randy Vasquez (born 1961), American actor
- Randy Vataha (born 1948), American football player
- Randy Velarde (born 1962), American baseball player
- Randy Velischek (born 1962), Canadian ice hockey player
- Randy Veres (1965–2016), American baseball player
- Randy Vock (born 1994), Swiss wrestler

=== W ===
- Randy Waldman (born 1955), American pianist
- Randy Waldrum (born 1956), American soccer coach
- Randy Walker (disambiguation), multiple people
- Randy Watt (born 1957), American colonel
- Randy Wayne (born 1981), American actor
- Randy Weaver (1948–2022), American army engineer
- Randy Weber (born 1953), American businessman
- Randy Weber (ski jumper) (born 1977), American ski jumper
- Randy Weeks, American singer-songwriter
- Randy Wells (born 1982), American baseball player
- Randy West (disambiguation), multiple people
- Randy Weston (1926–2018), American pianist
- Randy Weston (politician), American politician
- Randy White (disambiguation), multiple people
- Randy Wicker (born 1938), American author
- Randy Wiel (1951–2025), Dutch basketball player
- Randy Wigginton, American software developer
- Randy Wiles (1951–2015), American baseball player
- Randy Will (born 1964), American bobsledder
- Randy Williams (born 1953), American athlete
- Randy Williams (baseball) (born 1975), American baseball player
- Randy Winkler (born 1943), American football player
- Randy Winn (born 1974), American baseball player
- Randy Wittman (born 1959), American basketball player and coach
- Randy Wolf (born 1976), American baseball player
- Randy Wolters (born 1990), Dutch footballer
- Randy Wood (disambiguation), multiple people
- Randy Woods (born 1970), American basketball coach
- Randy Woodson (born 1957), American academic administrator
- Randy Woytowich (born 1954), Canadian curler
- Randy Wright (born 1961), American football player
- Randy Wynne (born 1993), American baseball player
- Randy Wyrozub (born 1950), Canadian ice hockey player

=== Y ===
- Randy Young (born 1954), American football player
- Randy Young (end) (1898–1975), American football player

=== Z ===
- Randy Zisk, American television director

== Women with the given name ==
- Randy Albelda (born 1955), American feminist economist, activist, author, and academic
- Randy Auerbach, American producer and daughter of Red Auerbach
- Randy Bloom (born 1955), American painter
- Randy Bülau (born 1981), German handball player
- Randy Crawford (born 1952), American singer
- Randy Lee Cutler (born 1964), Canadian writer, academic, educator, and artist
- Randy Danson, American actress
- Randy Fokke (born 1984), Dutch actress
- Randy Forsberg (1943–2007), American peace activist and political scientist
- Randy Frigon (born 1980), Canadian actress and singer-songwriter
- Randy Garber (artist) (born 1952), American artist
- Randy Givens (born 1962), American track and field athlete
- Randy Graff (born 1955), American actress and singer
- Randy Gurley (born 1963), American country singer
- Randy Kendrick, American conservative political activist and donor
- Randy Lofficier (born 1953), American author
- Randy Susan Meyers (born 1952), American author
- Randy Stuart (1924–1996), American actress
- Randy Taguchi (born 1959), Japanese writer
- Randy'L He-dow Teton (born 1976), Shoshone model for the Sacagawea dollar coin

== Fictional characters ==
- Randall "Randy" Boggs, an antagonist in the Monsters, Inc. franchise
- Randy Disher, in the show Monk
- Randy Feltface, a puppet in various Australian television shows
- Randy Hickey, a character in the American television series My Name Is Earl
- Randy Lenz, in the 1996 novel Infinite Jest by David Foster Wallace
- Randy Marsh, Stan Marsh's dad from South Park
- Randy Meeks, from Scream
- Randy Robertson (character), in the series Marvel Comics
- Randy Wagstaff, in the American television drama series The Wire

== See also ==
- Randall (disambiguation)
- Randi
- Randi (surname)
