= Jeff Gill (academic) =

Jeff M. Gill
- Born: December 22, 1960 (age 65)
- Education: UCLA; Georgetown University; American University
- Scientific career
- Fields: Statistics, Medicine, Political Science
- Workplaces: American University; University of Florida; Washington University in St. Louis
- Doctoral advisor: James A. Thurber
- Website: www.jeffgill.org

Jefferson Morris Gill (born December 22, 1960) is Distinguished Professor of Government, and of Mathematics & Statistics, the Director of the Center for Data Science, the previous Editor of Political Analysis, and a member of the Center for Behavioral Neuroscience at American University as of the Fall of 2017.

He was a Professor of Political Science at Washington University in St. Louis and the Director of the Center for Applied Statistics. He was also President of the Society for Political Methodology, and is an inaugural fellow of the Society for Political Methodology. Major areas of research and interest include: Political Methodology, American Politics, Statistical Computing, Research Methods, and Public Administration. Current research is focused on projects on work in the development of Bayesian hierarchical models, nonparametric Bayesian models, elicited prior development from expert interviews, as well in fundamental issues in statistical inference. He has extensive expertise in statistical computing, Markov chain Monte Carlo (MCMC) tools in particular. Most sophisticated Bayesian models for the social or medical sciences require complex, compute-intensive tools such as MCMC to efficiently estimate parameters of interest. Gill is an expert in these statistical and computational techniques and uses them to contribute to empirical knowledge in the biomedical and social sciences. Current theoretical work builds logically on Gill's prior applied work and adds opportunities to develop new hybrid algorithms for statistical estimation with multilevel specifications and complex time-series and spatial relationships.

Current applied work includes: energetics and cancer, long-term mental health outcomes from children's exposure to war, pediatric head trauma, analysis of mouse models, and molecular models of sickle cell disease. He also contributes to gene-wide associate studies (GWAS) that seek to discover correlated cancer genes related to obesity, diet, and exercise, as well as consult on computational genetics analysis. Other work includes Bayesian hierarchical models, Markov chain Monte Carlo theory, bureaucratic behavior in national security agencies, and issues in political epidemiology. His best known works include Essential Mathematics for Political and Social Research, with Cambridge University Press, and the third edition of Bayesian Methods for the Social and Behavioral Sciences (Chapman & Hall/CRC), which is the leading Bayesian text for these disciplines. He is the author of seven other books. His journal work has appeared in the Quarterly Journal of Political Science, Journal of the Royal Statistical Society, Journal of Politics, Electoral Studies, Statistical Science, Political Research Quarterly, Sociological Methods & Research, Public Administration Review, Journal of Public Administration Research and Theory, Canadian Journal of Political Science, Journal of Statistical Software, Political Analysis, Lancet Neurology, American Journal of Epidemiology, Journal of Urology, and others.

Gill was Visiting Professor of Government at Harvard University 2006–2007, 2018, 2021, and has been Affiliate Professor of Statistics at the University of Florida since 2001, and also taught at the University of California, Davis from 2004–2007. Previously, he was the Editor-in-Chief of the journal Political Analysis.

== Education ==
- B.A. in Mathematics at UCLA (1984)
- M.B.A at Georgetown (1988)
- Ph.D. (Government, Statistics) American University (1996)
- Post Doctoral Researcher, Harvard University (1997–98)

== Selected works ==
- ——— (2008). "Is Partial-Dimension Convergence a Problem for Inferences From MCMC Algorithms?". Political Analysis. 16 (2): 153–178. doi:10.1093/pan/mpm019.
- ——— (2007). Bayesian Methods: A Social and Behavioral Sciences Approach (Second ed.). CRC Press. ISBN 978-1-58488-562-7.
- ———; Zorn, Chris (2007). "The Etiology of Public Support for the Designated Hitter Rule" (PDF). Quarterly Journal of Political Science. 2 (2): 189–203. doi:10.1561/100.00006020. Archived from the original (PDF) on 2008-09-08.
- ——— (2006). Essential Mathematics for Political and Social Research. Cambridge University Press. ISBN 0-521-68403-X.
- ———; Altman, Micah; McDonald, Michael P. (2003). Numerical Issues in Statistical Computing for the Social Scientist. John Wiley & Sons. ISBN 0-471-23633-0.
