= Tröger =

Tröger, Troeger and Troger are German surnames. Notable people with these surnames include:

== People named Tröger ==
- Christian Tröger (born 1969), German swimmer
- Hans Tröger (1896–1982), German general
- Julius Tröger (1862–1942), German chemist
- Markus Tröger (born 1966), German speed skater
- Paul Tröger (1913–1992), German chess player and sport journalist
- Rudi Tröger (1929–2025), German painter and academic
- Sabine Tröger (born 1967), Austrian sprinter
- Willy Tröger (1928–2004), German footballer

== People named Troeger ==
- Heinrich Troeger (1901–1975), German jurist and politician
- Vera Troeger, German political scientist

== People named Troger ==
- Barbara Troger (born 1966), Austrian sport shooter
- Margitta Troger (fl. late 1950s), East German slalom canoeist
- Paul Troger (1698–1762), Austrian painter, draughtsman, and printmaker

== See also ==
- Tröger's base, an organic compound, named after Julius Tröger
