= Randy Stevenson =

American political scientist

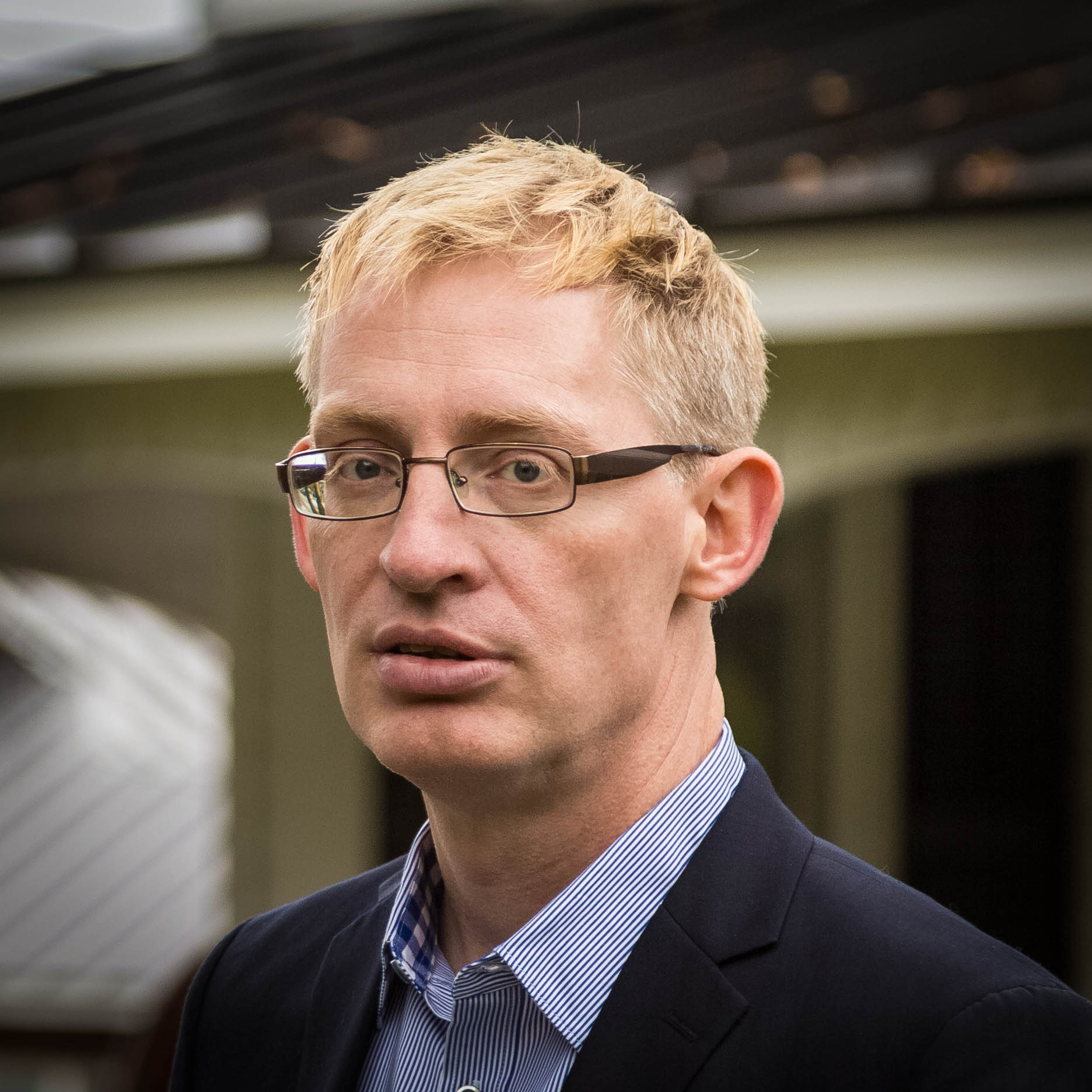
- Born: 1968 (age 57–58)

Academic background
- Education: Texas A&M University (B.A.); University of Rochester (M.A., Ph.D)

Academic work
- Institutions: Rice University, Houston, Texas
- Website: www.randystevenson.com

Randolph T. Stevenson is an American political scientist and professor at Rice University in Houston, Texas.

Stevenson’s research focuses on mass political behavior, cabinet formation, and institutional design in Western democracies. His book, The Economic Vote: How Political and Economic Institutions Condition Election Results (co-authored with Raymond Duch), was published in 2008 by Cambridge University Press and won the Gregory M. Luebbert award for the best book in comparative politics in 2007 or 2008. His current research projects include book projects exploring the sources of cross-national differences in political knowledge, political interest, and strategic voting. Stevenson has taught graduate-level courses in applied statistics and data science at Rice University, Oxford University, the Essex Summer School in Social Science Data Analysis, and the IPSA Summer Schools for Social Science Research Methods at the National University of Singapore and the University of Sao Paulo.

== Education ==
Stevenson attended Brook Hollow Christian High School in Dallas, Texas. In 1991, he completed a bachelor of arts in political science, magna cum laude, at Texas A&M University. He earned a master of arts in political science in 1993 from the University of Rochester and in 1996 a Ph.D in political science, with concentrations in comparative politics, international relations, political methodology, and game theory. He is a member of the Texas A&M chapter of Phi Beta Kappa.

== Career ==
Stevenson was a visiting researcher at the University of Haifa in Israel in 1993, The European University Institute in Florence, Italy in 1994, and the Hoover Institution at Stanford University in 1995. He was an assistant professor of political science at Rice university from 1996-2001, an associate professor from 2001-2008, and has been a full professor since 2008. He served on the board of the American National Election Studies from 2015-2019 and on the editorial boards of the American Journal of Political Science, Political research Quarterly, and Cognition, Psychology, and Behavior. Stevenson's work has been supported by numerous grants from the National Science Foundation.

Stevenson has been a statistical consultant on redistricting cases for the State of Texas, Spring Branch ISD, Islip New York, Ramapo New York, Eastpoint Michigan, the State of Georgia, Gwinnett County Georgia, Richardson ISD, Yakima, Washington, Houston ISD, Grand Prairie ISD, Irving Texas, Farmers Branch Texas, St Gabriel Louisiana, Terrebonne Louisiana, the state of South Carolina, and the state of Arkansas. He is also a founding partner of Workplace Analytics, which was acquired by Russell Reynolds Associates in 2020. Stevenson also played a key role in developing the Impact Genome Project, which is a data analytic platform for evaluating the differential impact of social programs.

== Selected publications ==
=== Books ===
- "The Economic Vote: How Political and Economic Institutions Condition Election Results" 2008 Cambridge University Press (with Raymond Duch), winner of the Gregory M. Luebbert award for the best book in comparative politics in 2007 or 2008.

=== Articles ===
- "Attributing Policy Influence under Coalition Governance" 2021. American Political Science Review (online appendix) (with David Fortunato, Nick Lin, and Mathias Tromborg)
- "Context, Heuristics, and Political Knowledge: Explaining Cross-National Variation in Citizens’ Left-Right Knowledge" 2016. Journal of Politics (with David Fortunato and Greg Vonnahme)
- "Responsibility Attribution for Collective Decision Makers." 2014. American Journal of Political Science 59(2) (with Raymond Duch).
- "Perceptions of Partisan Ideologies: The Effect of Coalition Participation." 2013. American Journal of Political Science (with David Fortunato).
- "The Conditional Impact of Incumbency on Government Formation." 2010. American Political Science Review (with Lanny Martin).
- "The Global Economy, Competency, and the Economic Vote." 2010. Journal of Politics 72(1): 1-19 (with Raymond Duch). Winner of the best paper in JOP; Winner of the best paper presented in the Political Economy Section of the APSA.
- "Context and the Economic Vote: A Multi-Level Analysis." Political Analysis 2005. Vol. 13, no. 4, 2005, pp. 387–409. (with Raymond Duch)
- "The Economy and Policy Preference: A Fundamental Dynamic of Democratic Politics." 2001. American Journal of Political Science Vol. 45, no. 3, pp. 620–633
- "Cabinet Formation in Parliamentary Democracies." 2001. American Journal of Political Science Vol. 45, no. 1, pp. 33–50. (with Lanny Martin)
- "Cabinet Terminations and Critical Events." American Political Science Review Vol. 94, no. 3. September 2000, pp. 627–640. (with Daniel Diermeier)
