= Ray Duch =

Raymond M. Duch (born 1953) is an Official Fellow at Nuffield College, University of Oxford, and Director of the Nuffield Centre of Experimental Social Sciences (CESS), which has centres in Oxford, Santiago (Chile) and Pune (India). He is also currently the Long Term Visiting professor at the Institute for Advanced Studies at the Toulouse School of Economics. Duch has served as associate editor of the American Journal of Political Science and the Journal of Experimental Political Science. In 2015, Duch was selected as a member of the UK Cabinet Office Cross-Whitehall Trial Advice Panel to offer Whitehall departments technical support in designing and implementing controlled experiments to assess policy effectiveness.

Duch's research focuses on responsibility attribution, incorporating elements of theory, experiments and analysis of public opinion. In 2008 he published an award-winning book, The Economic Vote, that demonstrates that citizens hold political parties accountable for economic outcomes. More recently Duch has turned to experiments in order to identify the information shortcuts that individuals deploy for attributing responsibility for collective decision making. Duch is associate editor of the Journal of Experimental Political Science and the American Journal of Political Science since 2012.

== Education ==
- 1982 University of Rochester, Ph.D.
- 1978 University of Rochester, M.A.
- 1975 University of Manitoba, B.A. Honours.

== Academic positions ==
- 2015–present Long Term Visiting professor, Institute for Advanced Studies in Toulouse (IAST), Toulouse School of Economics
- 2012–present Official Fellow, Nuffield College, University of Oxford
- 2006-2012 Professorial Fellow, Nuffield College and University Professor of Quantitative Political Science, University of Oxford
- 2008–present Director, Centre for Experimental Social Sciences, Nuffield College, University of Oxford
- 2003-2006 Senator Don Henderson Scholar in Political Science, University of Houston
- 2001-2003 Professor, Political Science Department, University of Houston
- 1990-2001 Associate Professor, Political Science Department, University of Houston
- 1982-1990 Assistant Professor, Political Science Department, University of Houston
- 1981-1982 Assistant Professor, State University of New York

== Publications ==
- "A Comprehensive Comparison of Students and Non-students in Classic Experimental Games", Journal of Economic Behavior and Organization (2015), 113:26-33. (with Michele Belot and Luis Miller)
- "Responsibility Attribution for Collective Decision Makers", American Journal of Political Science (2015) 59(2):372-389. (with Wojtek Przepiorka and Randy Stevenson)
- "Do Attitudes About Immigration Predict Willingness to Admit Individual Immigrants? A Cross-National Test of the Person-Positivity Bias", Public Opinion Quarterly (2013) 77(3):641-665. (with Shanto Iyengar et al.)
- "Voter Perceptions of Agenda Power and Attribution of Responsibility for Economic Performance", Electoral Studies (2013) 32:512-516. (with Randy Stevenson).
- "The Meaning and Use of Subjective Perceptions in Models of Economic Voting", Electoral Studies (2013) 32(2): 305–320. (with Randy Stevenson).
- "Election Campaigns, Public Opinion and the Financial Crisis of 2008-2010 in the U.K. and Germany" in Nancy Bermeo and Larry M. Bartels, eds. Mass Politics in Tough Times: Opinion, Votes and Protest in the Great Recession, Russell Sage Foundation and Oxford University Press 2013. (with Inaki Sagarzazu).
- "European Political Science Association and the Internationalization of Political Science" Comparative Politics Newsletter 2012.
- "The Heterogeneity of Consumer Sentiment in an Increasingly Homogeneous Global Economy", Electoral Studies (September 2011) 30(3):399-405. (with Paul Kellstedt).
- "Context and Economic Expectations: When Do Voters get it Right?", British Journal of Political Science (January 2011) 41:1-31. (with Randy Stevenson).
- "Coalition-Directed Voting in Multi-Party Democracies", American Political Science Review (November 2010) 104(4): 698–719. (with Jeff May and David Armstrong).
- "Why can Voters Anticipate Post-election Coalition Formation Likelihoods", Electoral Studies (2010) 29(3): 308–315. (with David Armstrong).
- "The Global Economy, Competency and the Economic Vote", Journal of Politics (January, 2010) 72(1): 105–123. (with Randy Stevenson).
- "Selecting Obama: The 2008 Economic Vote in Context" Political Economy Newsletter 2009.
- The Economic Vote: How Political and Economic Institutions Condition Election Results, Cambridge University Press, 2008. (with Randy Stevenson).
- "Assessing the Magnitude of the Economic Vote over Time and Across Nations", Electoral Studies (September 2006) 25(3):528-47. (with Randy Stevenson).
- "Comparative Studies of the Economy and the Vote", Encyclopedia of Comparative Politics eds. Carles Boix and Susan Stokes 2007 Oxford: Oxford University Press.
- "Context and the Economic Vote: A Multi-level Analysis", Political Analysis (Autumn, 2005) 13(4): 387–409. (with Randy Stevenson).
- "It's Not Whether You Win or Lose, But How YouPlay the Game: Self-Interest, Social Justice, and Mass Attitudes toward Market Transition", American Political Science Review (August, 2004) 98(3):437-452. (with Harvey Palmer).
- "Liberty, Authority, and the New Politics: A Reconsideration", Journal of Theoretical Politics (January, 2004 Volume 16 (3): 233–262. (with Kaare Strom).
- "Strategic Voting in Post-communist Democracy", British Journal of Political Science (January, 2002) 32(1): 63–91. (with Harvey Palmer).
- "Heterogeneous Perceptions of Economic Conditions in Cross-National Perspective," chapter in Economic Voting, eds. Han Dorussen and Michaell Taylor (New York: Routledge) 2002. (with Harvey D. Palmer).
- "A Developmental Model of Heterogeneous Economic Voting in New Democracies", American Political Science Review (December, 2001) 95 (4):895-910.
- "Do Surveys Provide Representative or Whimsical Assessments of the Economy" Political Analysis (2001) 9: 58–77. (with Harvey Palmer).
- "Heterogeneity in Perceptions of National Economic Conditions", American Journal of Political Science (2000) (October) 44: 635–649. (with Harvey Palmer and Christopher Anderson).
- "The Electoral Connection and Democratic Consolidation", Electoral Studies (1998) 17:149-174.
- "Participation in the New Democracies of Central and Eastern Europe: Cultural versus Rational Choice Explanations", in Samuel Barnes and Janos Simon, eds. The Postcommunist Citizen Budapest: Erasumus Foundation 1998.
- "Economics and the Vulnerability of Pan European Institutions", Political Behavior (1997). (with Michaell Taylor).
- "Rationality", in The Encyclopedia of Democracy, ed. Seymour Martin Lipset, Washington, D.C.: Congressional Quarterly Books 1995.
- "Economic Chaos and the Fragility of Democratic Transition in Former Communist Regimes", Journal of Politics (February, 1995).
- A Reply to Abramson and Inglehart's "Education, Security, and Postmaterialism", American Journal of Political Science 38: 398-411 (August

1994). (with Michaell Taylor).

- "Postmaterialism and the Emerging Soviet Democracy", Political Research Quarterly (March, 1994). (with James L. Gibson).
- "Political Intolerance in the USSR: The Distribution and Etiology of Mass Opinion", Comparative Political Studies (October, 1993). (with James L. Gibson).
- "Tolerating Economic Reform: Popular Support for Transition to a Free Market in the Former Soviet Union", American Political Science Review 87:590-608 (September 1993).
- "Post-Materialism and the Economic Condition", American Journal of Political Science 37: 747-778 (August 1993). (with Michaell Taylor).
- "Political Culture in the Emerging Soviet Democracy", in The New Soviet Citizen: Public Opinion in the Gorbachev Era, ed., Arthur H. Miller, William M. Reisinger, and Vicki L. Heslie. Boulder, Col.: Westview Press (1993). (with James L. Gibson).
- "Support for Rights in Western Europe and the Soviet Union: An Analysis of the Beliefs of Mass Publics", in Research on Democracy and Society, Volume I, Democratization in Eastern and Western Europe, edited by Frederick D. Weil. Greenwich, CT: JAI Press, 1993. (with James L. Gibson).
- "Democratic Values and the Transformation of the Soviet Union", Journal of Politics 54 (May, 1992):329-371. (with James L. Gibson and Kent Tedin).
- "Attitudes Toward Jews and the Soviet Political Culture", Journal of Soviet Nationalities 2 (spring, 1992), 77–117. (with James L. Gibson).
- "Anti-Semitic Attitudes of the Mass Public: Estimates and Explanations Based on a Survey of the Moscow Oblast", Public Opinion Quarterly 56 (spring, 1992), 1-28. (with James L. Gibson).
- "Putting Up With Fascists in Western Europe: A Comparative, Cross-National Analysis of Political Tolerance", Western Political Quarterly 45 (March, 1992). (with James L. Gibson).
- "Elitist Theory and Political Tolerance in Western Europe", Political Behavior 13 (September, 1991). (with James L. Gibson).
- Privatizing the Economy: Telecommunications Policy in Comparative Perspective, Ann Arbor, Michigan: University of Michigan Press, 1991.
- "The Politics of Investment by the Nationalized Sector", Western Political Quarterly (spring, 1990).
- "Individual Freedom in Eastern Europe" Houston Update 3 October 1988.
- "Investment Subsidy Programs in Comparative Perspective", in Holzer and Nagel, eds., Productivity and Public Policy, Beverly Hills, Cal.: Sage Publications, 1984.
