= Randi (disambiguation) =

Randi is the feminine form of Randy, a given name.

Randi may also refer to:

- Randi (surname), a list of people with the surname
- 3163 Randi, an asteroid named after James Randi
- The Amazing Randi, stage name of magician James Randi
- RANDI, short for "random integer"

== See also ==
- Randy (disambiguation)
