= Avent =

Avent is a surname. Notable people with the surname include:

- Anthony Avent (born 1969), American basketball player
- Elliott Avent, American baseball coach
- Mayna Treanor Avent (1868–1959), American painter
- Randy Avent, American engineer
- Roxanne Avent (born 1976), American film producer
- Tony Avent, American horticulturist
- Andrew Avent, Businessman
