= Gaustad (surname) =

Gaustad is a surname. Notable people with the surname include:

- Dutch Gaustad (1889–1945), American football player
- Edwin Gaustad (1923–2011), American historian
- Gaustad, American musician
- John Anders Gaustad (born 1980), Norwegian cross-country skier
- Paul Gaustad (born 1982), American ice hockey player
- Randi Gaustad (born 1942), Norwegian curator and art historian

== See also ==
- Gaustad, neighbourhood of Oslo
- Gustad, surname
