= Visalia (disambiguation) =

Visalia is the fifth-largest city in the San Joaquin Valley of California.

Visalia may also refer to several places:

- Downtown Visalia, California
- Greater Visalia Area, California
  - Visalia Municipal Airport
- Visalia, Kentucky, a former city
