= Ken Kendrick =

American baseball executive

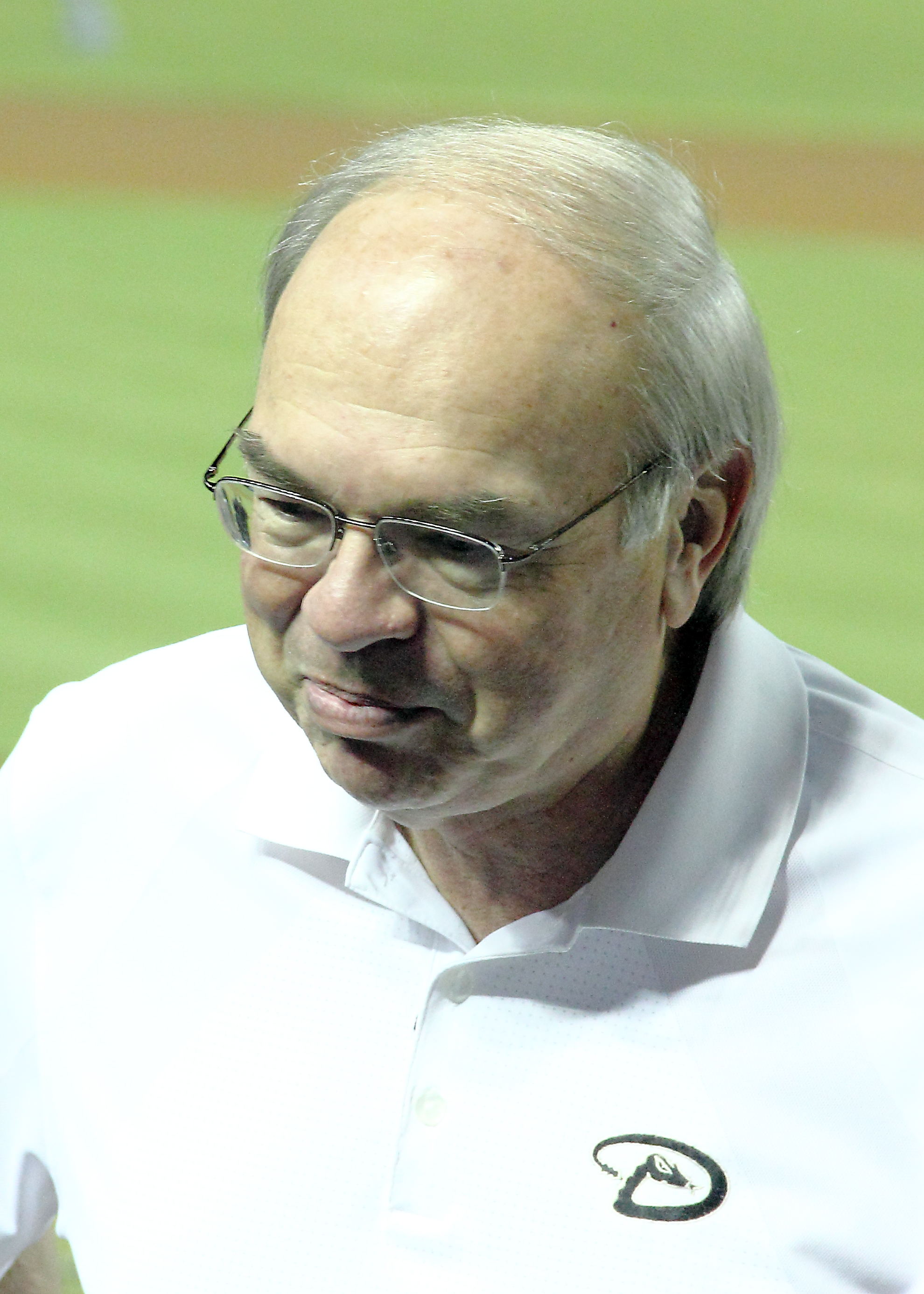
- Born: September 2, 1943 (age 82); Princeton, West Virginia, U.S.
- Education: West Virginia University (BBA)
- Occupation: Businessman
- Known for: Owner of Arizona Diamondbacks; Founder of Datatel, Inc.

Earl Gentry "Ken" Kendrick Jr. (born September 2, 1943) is an American billionaire businessman who is the principal owner and managing general partner of the National League's Arizona Diamondbacks. He became part-owner with the team's inception in 1995. He has been managing general partner since 2004, overseeing day-to-day operations and acting as the organization's designated representative when the Major League Baseball owners convene.

Prior to his position with the team, Kendrick founded Datatel, Inc., a software development company, and served as a banking industry executive in Texas. He had a net worth of $1.2 billion as of March 2026.

== Business career ==
A native of Princeton, West Virginia, Kendrick received a Bachelor of Science in Business Administration from West Virginia University in 1965, Kendrick started his career with IBM.

Three years later, he founded Datatel, Inc., which has become the worldwide leader in the development of computer software for the management of infrastructure technology for colleges, universities and foundations. In 2011, Datatel acquired SunGard Higher Education for $1.75 billion. The combined companies were renamed Ellucian and were sold in 2015 for $3.5 billion to TPG Capital.

Kendrick also served as President of a Texas-based financial services technology company during the 1980s. In 1989, Kendrick became the principal investor in Woodforest National Bank in The Woodlands, Texas, which is one of the nation's largest primarily employee-owned banks. Woodforest National Bank, a $9-billion entity with 5,000 employees, is a subsidiary of Woodforest Financial Group.

== Diamondbacks tenure ==
During Kendrick's tenure, the Diamondbacks have won two National League West Division Championships (2007, 2011), competed in two NLCS series (2007, 2023), and returned to the World Series for the first time in 22 years Under Kendrick's leadership, through equity and debt restructures, the team has eliminated more than $350 million of debt.

During Kendrick's time as Managing General Partner, the Diamondbacks have hosted an All-Star Game at Chase Field in 2011, and opened a Spring Training facility that is widely considered the finest in all of baseball in Salt River Fields at Talking Stick.

ESPN the Magazine rated the D-backs as the No. 6 team in Major League Baseball in its Ultimate Standings, which gauges success both on and off the field and Yahoo! has referred to the Arizona Diamondbacks as the "best workplace in sports."

In 2020, Kendrick was appointed to the National Baseball Hall of Fame and Museum Board of Directors.

== Personal life ==
Kendrick and his wife, Randy Kendrick, have two children, Cal and Catie, and make their home in Paradise Valley, Arizona.

Kendrick also owns Bumble Bee Ranch, providing western lifestyle experiences to children's charities throughout Arizona in addition to the Ironbridge Golf Club in Glenwood Springs, Colorado.

=== Baseball card collection ===
A baseball card collector his entire life, Kendrick is the owner of the T206 Honus Wagner baseball card once owned by Wayne Gretzky. The Wagner card and 34 other baseball cards in Kendrick's collection, titled "The D-backs Collection", were previously displayed at the National Baseball Hall of Fame and Museum in Cooperstown, New York.

In February 2021, Kendrick and several partners including Larry Fitzgerald, NBA player Kevin Durant and former tennis champion Andy Roddick purchased the parent company of Professional Sports Authenticator (PSA), Collectors Universe, an authenticator and grader of memorabilia.

=== Philanthropy ===
Kendrick is active in many philanthropic endeavors, including his role as Chairman of the Arizona Diamondbacks Foundation, which has donated over $80 million since its inception.

He also has served on boards for various charities including Barrow Neurological Institute, Dignity Health, TGen Foundation, Cleveland Clinic Foundation, and the Phoenix Children's Hospital. The University of Georgia elected Kendrick to its Board of Visitors.

In 2016, torrential rains over parts of West Virginia caused devastating flooding in many counties and Kendrick came to the aid of his home state, setting up a relief program that raised more than $1 million. In 2022, Kendrick pledged $20 million to WVU to expand economics education through the Chambers College.

During the Covid-19 pandemic in 2020, Kendrick guided more than $2 million in charitable donations with a focus on non-profit organizations assisting those in need, while creating a fund specifically for Chase Field gameday staff unable to work during the shutdown.
