= Randy Lewis =

Randy Lewis may refer to:

- Randy Lewis (executive), businessman and disability advocate
- Randy Lewis (racing driver) (born 1945), American Indianapolis 500 driver
- Randy Lewis (triple jumper) (born 1978), Grenadian triple jumper
- Randy Lewis (wrestler) (born 1959), American former Olympic champion wrestler
- Randy Lewis, music critic for the Los Angeles Times
