= Gustad =

Gustad is a surname. Notable people with the surname include:

- Aud Gustad (1917–2000), Norwegian trade unionist and politician
- Kaizad Gustad (born 1968), Indian film director and writer
- Randi Gustad (born 1977), Norwegian team handball player

== See also ==
- Gaustad (surname)
