= Randy Bloom =

American painter

Randy Bloom (born 1955) is an internationally exhibited American painter. Bloom has exhibited at the O.K Harris, Tower Gallery, Gershwin Gallery, Cooper Classics Collection and Jack Tilton galleries in New York City, the accostage and Le Muse galleries in Japan, and the Galleria de arte Magick in Easton, Pennsylvania, among others. Art critic, Carter Ratcliff in the journal of "A Gathering of the Tribes" has written in describing the artist's work...."thoroughly sophisticated and her forms and colors are mutually clarifying. Yet there is more to her art, because of the mode—or the mood—in which she creates it. This artist doesn’t soberly illuminate or clarify so much as animate or even intoxicate, imbuing her pictorial devices with a giddy sense of the parts they play in the big picture"....

In 1972, Bloom was awarded a BA in Painting & Art History by Franconia College.

In August 1985, Bloom was one of five artists included in a show called "Two Plus Three" at the Tower Gallery in New York City. Michael Brenson, in the New York Times, wrote about the exhibition "Each artist in the show is, of course, abstract. Each has the Formalist commitment to surface. Each is intent upon exploring the medium itself. Of course, they use acrylic, sometimes spreading it out like sand, sometimes caking it on the canvas like mud." Commenting on Bloom's work, Brenson wrote "Mr. Bloom [sic] digs into it, makes it matte and suggests aerial views of landscapes like Jules Olitski. There is an abiding interest in the sculptural possibilities of paint and a pull toward subject matter."

In 2000, Bloom exhibited a total of fifteen paintings at the Cooper Classics Collection in New York City. The art journalist Piri Halasz (who has long followed the artist's progress) wrote of the exhibition in New York Arts Magazine, "Bloom's most recent style has been called a combination of minimalism and color-field. While this description has some truth, her minimalism is not minimal enough to destroy her work's variety and individualism, while the richness and delicacy of her colors, and the freedom with which she applies paint makes her pictures worthy descendants of 60s color-field painting by such masters as Frankenthaler and Noland. Each of the eight large paintings in this show are composed of five to eight strips of color, about six feet long and about four inches wide, spaced more or less evenly across a canvas painted in a contrasting color."

From October 20 until November 14, 2015 her recent paintings were the subject of a solo exhibition at the Andre Zarre Gallery in the Soho neighborhood in the borough of Manhattan in New York City. In writing about this exhibition in Observer, Piri Halasz states about the works "They glow like jewels because each has a base layer of charcoal gray paint that also surrounds its image—setting that image off like the black velvet of a jewelry case"...
