= Randy Rasmussen =

Randy Rasmussen may refer to:

- Randy Rasmussen (American football, born 1945), American football player
- Randy Rasmussen (American football, born 1960), American football player

== See also ==
- Randy, people with the given name Randy
- Randy (disambiguation), a disambiguation page for Randy
