= Randi (surname) =

Randi is a surname. Notable people with the surname include:

- Antonio Randi, Italian wrestler
- Don Randi, American keyboard player, bandleader and songwriter
- Ermanno Randi, Italian film actor
- James Randi ("The Amazing Randi"), Canadian-American stage magician and scientific skeptic
- Leah Randi, American bass player and vocalist
- Paola Randi, Italian film director

== See also ==
- Randi (given name)
- Randi (disambiguation)
