= Randy J. Nelson =

American neuroscientist

Randy J. Nelson is an American psychologist and neuroscientist who currently holds the Hazel Ruby McQuain Chair for Neurological Research and the founding chair of the Department of Neuroscience at the West Virginia University School of Medicine. Much of his research has focused on the contribution of circadian and seasonal rhythms on physiology and behavior.

== Early life and education ==
Nelson graduated from James A. Garfield High School in Garrettsville, Ohio in 1972. He was inducted into the Garfield High School Hall of Fame in 2020. He earned his bachelor's degree in psychology at the University of California, Berkeley in 1978, and then a master's degree from Berkeley in 1980. Trained under Irving Zucker, Nelson then earned a PhD in Psychology, as well as a second PhD in Endocrinology, also from Berkeley. Nelson was the first in the US to simultaneously earn two PhDs. He then completed an NIH-funded postdoctoral fellowship at the University of Texas, Austin.

== Research and career ==
Although his dissertation advisor's lab was known for studies in circadian rhythms research, Nelson started working on photoperiodism (day length) and seasonality. He investigated the mechanisms that allow rodents to measure day length to determine the time of year in order to anticipate predictable events, such as winter, to initiate temporally-important adaptations such as reproductive, metabolic, and immune adjustments. During his postdoctoral studies, he established the roles of additional environmental signals that fine-tuned the timing of seasonality.

Nelson was appointed to the faculty in psychology and neuroscience at Johns Hopkins University from 1986 until 2000, when he moved to the Ohio State University (OSU) where he was Professor and Chair of the Department of Neuroscience. In 2012, he was appointed as the inaugural Distinguished Professor of the College of Medicine, and in 2013 the Board of Trustees conferred the title of Distinguished University Professor upon him.

== Research ==
Nelson has conducted research in four fields (1) seasonality in physiology and behavior, (2) photoperiodism and immune function (3), circadian rhythms and sleep, and (4) aggression). Although much of his early research was on reproductive physiology and behavior, his lab started to use day length as a precise environmental probe to elicit season-specific changes in brain and behavior. His group demonstrated that short days impair spatial learning and memory by dampening LTP. Indeed the hippocampus is reduced in size in short days or by melatonin treatment that mimics short days. He also demonstrated that blood flow into the hippocampus is curtailed by short days, which may drive the reduction in neurogenesis that has been reported.

At Johns Hopkins, Nelson formed important collaborations with Solomon Snyder among others in the burgeoning field of understanding the behavioral role of specific gene products. He had a role in identifying genes involved in the regulation of motivated behaviors such as aggression and reproduction. For example, in the early stages of the “transgenic mouse revolution”, he and his Hopkins colleague published a comprehensive series of studies detailing the effects on nitric oxide (NO), at the time a novel neural modulator, on behavior. They established a large increase in aggressive behavior and excessive, inappropriate sexual behavior in transgenic mice lacking the NOS gene, which suggested that NO typically forms a behavioral 'brake' on impulsive, motivated behaviors. The functional significance of gaseous neuromodulators was established by this research. This original study was the first comprehensive behavioral phenotyping study in a transgenic mouse. It has been cited over 900 times and provoked much basic research into the biological bases underlying aggression.

Nelson contributed to the development of the subdiscipline of ecoimmunology. With many collaborators, he identified the mechanisms by which immune systems are bolstered to counteract seasonally-recurrent stressors, such as low temperature or food shortages. In this context, he has studied stress, infectious diseases, autoimmune diseases, and cancers, as well as the role of hormones, such as melatonin and glucocorticoids. His group has documented that animals, including humans, monitor day length (photoperiod) to engage seasonally appropriate adaptations in anticipation of harsh winter conditions. They proposed that photoperiodic information, mediated by melatonin, also influenced immune responses. Individuals could improve survival if seasonally recurring stressors were anticipated and countered. This 20 year-long series of studies suggest that short day lengths (i.e. winter conditions) reroute energy from reproduction and growth to bolster immune function. The net result of these photoperiod-mediated adjustments is enhanced immune function and increased survival. This work has important implications for understanding the dynamics of the influenza season, as well as other emergent seasonal diseases.

More recently, Nelson focused on the effects of dim light at night on the disruption of circadian rhythms to examine a number of outcomes, including obesity, depression, cognition, cardiac disease, and cancer. His lab has established that exposure to dim light at night disrupts the expression of circadian clock gene expression, provokes neuroinflammation, and increases body mass gain and depressive-like responses, as well as impairs cognition, immune function, metabolism, and recovery from cardiac arrest and stroke.

== Awards ==
He has been elected as Fellow Status in the American Association for the Advancement of Science, the American Psychological Association, the Association for Psychological Science, and the Animal Behavior Society. He received the Daniel Lehrman Lifetime Career Award from the Society for Behavioral Neuroendocrinology in 2016. Nelson received the Education Award from the Society for Neuroscience in 2017, and gave the Neal Miller Distinguished Lecture for the American Psychological Association in 2020. He was elected as President of the Association of Medical School Neuroscience Department Chairpersons for 2025-2027. Among his many notable trainees are Sabra Klein and Staci Bilbo.

== Selected publications ==
=== Books ===
An Introduction to Behavioral Endocrinology, a leading textbook,

Nelson, R.J. 2019. (Hormones and Behavior section editor). Encyclopedia of Animal Behavior. Second Edition. Elsevier Major Reference Works, Oxford, UK.

Nelson, R.J. (Editor). 2022. Encyclopedia of Neuroscience. Oxford University Press.

Nelson, R.J. & Kriegsfeld, L.J. 2022. An Introduction to Behavioral Endocrinology. Sixth Edition. Sinauer Associates, An imprint of Oxford University Press: Sunderland, MA.

Fonken, L.F. & Nelson, R.J. (Editors). 2023. Biological Implications of Circadian Disruption: A Modern Health Challenge. Cambridge University Press.

Nelson, R.J. & Weil, Z.M. (Editors). 2023. Biographical History of Behavioral Neuroendocrinology. Springer Nature, New York.

Nelson, R.J. 2025. Dark Matters, The Role of Light on Health. Oxford University Press, Oxford, UK.

=== Most cited peer reviewed journal articles ===
Bedrosian, T.A. & Nelson, R.J. 2017. Timing of light exposure affects mood and brain circuits. Translational Psychiatry, 7: e1017. PM28140399. •

Borniger, J.C., Walker, W.H., Gaudier-Diaz, M.M., Stegman, C., Zhang, N., Hollyfield, J.L., Nelson, R.J. & DeVries, A.C. 2017. Time-of-day dictates transcriptional inflammatory responses to cytotoxic chemotherapy. Scientific Reports, 7:1-11. PM28117419. •

Cisse, YM, Russart, KL, & Nelson, RJ. 2017. Parental exposure to dim light at night prior to mating alters offspring adaptive immunity. Scientific Reports, 31:1-10. PM28361901. •

Borniger J.C., Walker W.H., Surbhi, Emmer K.M., Zhang N., Zalenski A.A., Muscarella S.L., Fitzgerald J.A., Smith A.N., Braam C., Tial T., Magalang U., Lustberg M.B., Nelson RJ., DeVries A.C. 2018. A role for hypocretin/orexin in metabolic dysfunction in a mouse model of non-metastatic breast cancer. Cell Metabolism, 27:1-12. A Role for Hypocretin/Orexin in Metabolic and Sleep Abnormalities in a Mouse Model of Non-metastatic Breast Cancer. •

Fonken, L.K., Bedrosian, T.A., Zhang, N., Weil, Z.M., DeVries, A.C., & Nelson, R.J. 2019. Dim light at night impairs recovery from global cerebral ischemia. Experimental Neurology, 317:100-109. doi.org/10.1016/j.expneurol.2019.02.008 •

Walker, W.H., Zhang, N., Melendez-Hernandez, O.H., Pascoe, J., DeVries, A.C., & Nelson, R.J. 2020. Acute exposure to dim light at night is sufficient to induce neurological changes and depressive-like behavior. Molecular Psychiatry, 25: 1080–1093. doi: 10.1038/ s41380-019-0430-4 •

Walker, W.H., Walton, J.C., DeVries, A.C., & Nelson, R.J. 2020. Circadian rhythm disruption and mental health. Translational Psychiatry, 10:28 doi: 10.1038/s41398-020-0694-0.

== Personal life ==
Nelson is married to A. Courtney DeVries, a prominent cancer biologist. They have two sons.
