= James A. Thurber =

American political scientist

- James A. Thurber
- Born: May 29, 1943 (age 83)
- Education: Indiana University
- Scientific career
- Fields: Political science
- Workplaces: American University
- Doctoral students: Jeff Gill

James Allen Thurber (born May 29, 1943) is university distinguished professor of government and founder (1979) and former director (1979–2016) of the Center for Congressional and Presidential Studies (American.edu/spa/ccps) and affiliate distinguished professor of public administration and policy at American University, Washington, D.C. He is author or editor of numerous books and more than 90 articles and chapters on Congress, the U.S. presidency, interest groups and lobbying, and campaigns and elections.

== Career ==
During his tenure at American University, Thurber served as the principal investigator of a seven-year study of campaign conduct supported by a Pew Charitable Trusts grant and as principal investigator of a four-year study analyzing lobbying and ethics for the Committee for Economic Development, and is working on international lobbying and ethics reform with the Organization for Economic Cooperation and Development. He founded the biannual Campaign Management Institute, the Public Affairs and Advocacy Institute, and annual European Public Affairs and Advocacy Institute in Brussels. He was worked for several members of the U.S. Congress on congressional reorganization, ethics, and lobbying reform since 1976. Thurber was honored as the American University Scholar/Teacher of the Year in 1996 and received the 2010 Walter Beach Pi Sigma Alpha American Political Science Association award for his work combining applied and academic research. He is also a fellow of the National Academy of Public Administration, and a member of the American Bar Association's Task Force on Lobbying Law Reform. Thurber was an American Political Science Association Congressional Fellow in 1973-74 and is currently on its executive board. He was awarded the Senator Mark O. Hatfield Annual Award for Applied Public Policy Research. He serves on the executive board of the U.S. Capitol Historical Society. He has lectured at over 100 universities in the U.S. and in 40 countries. Thurber earned a BS in political science from the University of Oregon and PhD in political science from Indiana University Bloomington.
