= Randy Hunt =

Randy Hunt may refer to:

- Randy Hunt (American football), American football coach
- Randy Hunt (baseball) (born 1960), Major League Baseball catcher
- Randy Hunt (politician) (born 1957), member of the Massachusetts House of Representatives
