= Randy Johnson (disambiguation) =

Randy Johnson (born 1963) is an American former baseball pitcher.

Randy Johnson may also refer to:

== Sports ==
- Randy Johnson (designated hitter) (born 1958), American former baseball designated hitter, 1980–1982
- Randy Johnson (offensive lineman) (born 1953), American football player
- Randy Johnson (quarterback) (1944–2009), American football quarterback
- Randy Johnson (third baseman) (born 1956), American former baseball infielder, 1982–1984
- Duke Johnson (Randy Johnson Jr., born 1993), American football running back

== Others ==
- Randy Johnson (Minnesota elected official), current Hennepin County commissioner
- Randy Johnson (Florida politician) (born 1959), former member of the Florida House of Representatives

== See also ==
- Randy Johnston (disambiguation)
- Peter Randall Johnson (1880–1956), British cricketer
