= Tröger's base =

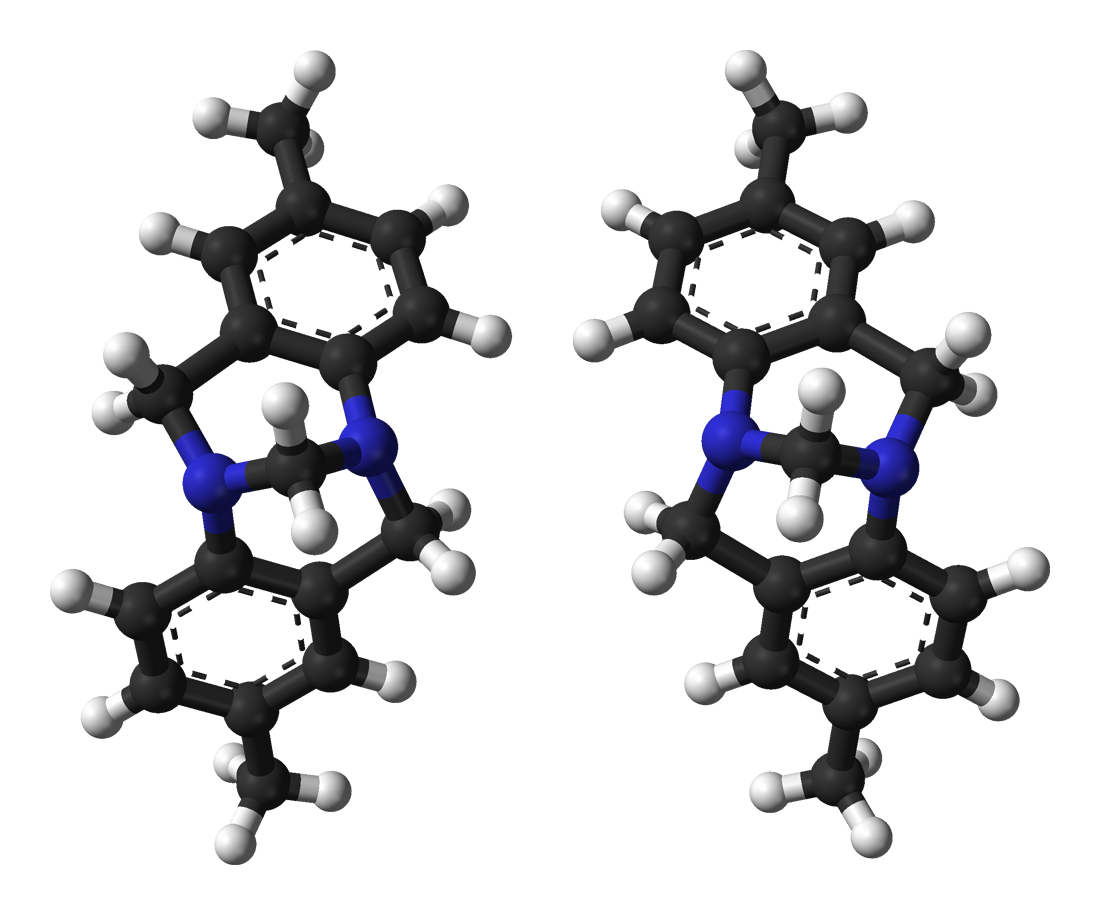
- Ball-and-stick models of the two enantiomers of Tröger's base

Names
- Preferred IUPAC name 2,8-Dimethyl-6H,12H-5,11-methanodibenzo[b,f][1,5]diazocine
- Other names Troeger's base

Identifiers
CAS Number	529-81-7 (±); 21451-74-1 (+); 14645-24-0 (-)
3D model (JSmol)	Interactive image
ChemSpider	170601
ECHA InfoCard	100.150.499
PubChem CID	196981
UNII	SP9UUR2HG4
CompTox Dashboard (EPA)	DTXSID30200950
- InChI: InChI=1S/C17H18N2/c1-12-3-5-16-14(7-12)9-18-11-19(16)10-15-8-13(2)4-6-17(15)18/h3-8H,9-11H2,1-2H3 Key: SXPSZIHEWFTLEQ-UHFFFAOYSA-N; InChI=1/C17H18N2/c1-12-3-5-16-14(7-12)9-18-11-19(16)10-15-8-13(2)4-6-17(15)18/h3-8H,9-11H2,1-2H3 Key: SXPSZIHEWFTLEQ-UHFFFAOYAW
- SMILES: c1(ccc3c(c1)CN4c2ccc(cc2CN3C4)C)C

Properties
Chemical formula	C_{17}H_{18}N_{2}
Molar mass	250.345 g·mol^{−1}
Melting point	135–6 °C (275–43 °F; 408–279 K)
- Except where otherwise noted, data are given for materials in their standard state (at 25 °C [77 °F], 100 kPa). Infobox references

Tröger's base is a white solid tetracyclic organic compound. Its chemical formula is (CH_{3}C_{6}H_{3}NCH_{2})_{2}CH_{2}. Tröger's base and its analogs are soluble in various organic solvents and strong acidic aqueous solutions due to their protonation. It is named after Julius Tröger, who first synthesized it in 1887.

== History ==
Tröger's original research in 1887 failed to elaborate the exact structure of his new product, leading Johannes Wislicenus, the departmental director of the time, to assign a mediocre grade for Tröger's thesis. Though various possible structures had been drawn for Tröger's product, its correct structure remained as a mystery for 48 years, until the final elucidation in 1935 by Spielman.

== Structure and chirality ==
Enantiomers of Tröger's base: (5S,11S)-enantiomer (above) and (5R,11R)-enantiomer (below)

The nitrogen inversion normally leads to a rapid equilibrium between the enantiomers of chiral amines, that prevents them showing any optical activity. The inversion can be stopped by conformational strain as Tröger's base has demonstrated that nitrogen is capable of forming a stereogenic center in organic molecules. In Tröger's base, this inversion is not possible, and the nitrogen atoms are defined stereogenic centers. The separation of the enantiomers of Tröger's base was first accomplished by Vladimir Prelog in 1944. Prelog performed column chromatography using a chiral stationary phase as a relatively new method that later on gained popularity and became a standard procedure. Tröger's base and its analogs can be resolved by various methods including chiral HPLC or be made as a single enantiomer.

Almost 30 years after Tröger's initial report, Hünlich described another mysterious product obtained from the condensation of formaldehyde and 2,4-diaminotoluene. After almost a century the structure of Hünlich's product was elucidated by X-ray crystallography as a C_{2}-symmetric amine-carrying analogue of Tröger's base. Tröger's base is a diamine, which exceptionally exhibits chirality due to the prevented inversion of configuration of two bridgehead stereogenic tertiary amine groups. Tröger's base and its analogs racemize under acidic conditions through the formation of iminium intermediates, which can be prevented by the replacement of methano-bridge with an ethano-bridge.

The molecule can be considered a molecular tweezer as the skeleton forces the molecule in a rigid locked conformation with the aromatic rings in 90 degree proximity.

== Reactions ==
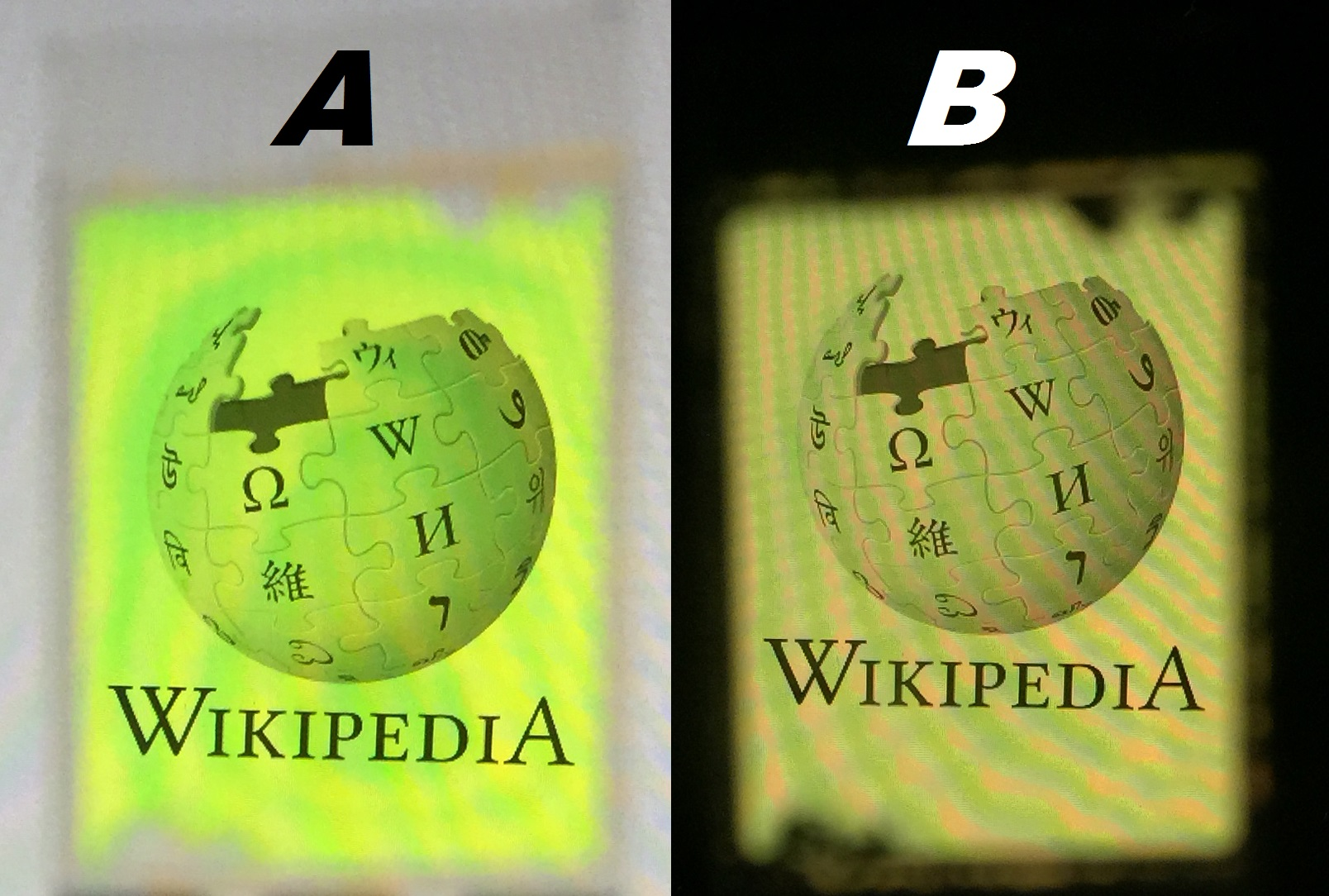
optically active Tröger base analog forms helical superstructures that enables the shown LCD prototype to pass specific wavelengths of light through a pair of parallel (A) and crossed (B) linear polarizers

Tröger's base and its analogs have attracted much academic interest. They function as ligands and ligand precursors in coordination chemistry. When the methyl groups are replaced by carboxylic acids or pyridine amide groups a host–guest chemistry interaction can take place between the Tröger's base and other molecules including glycosaminoglycans. It is found that the cavity dimensions are optimal for inclusion of suberic acid but that with a longer acid sebacic acid or a shorter acid adipic acid the interaction is less favorable.

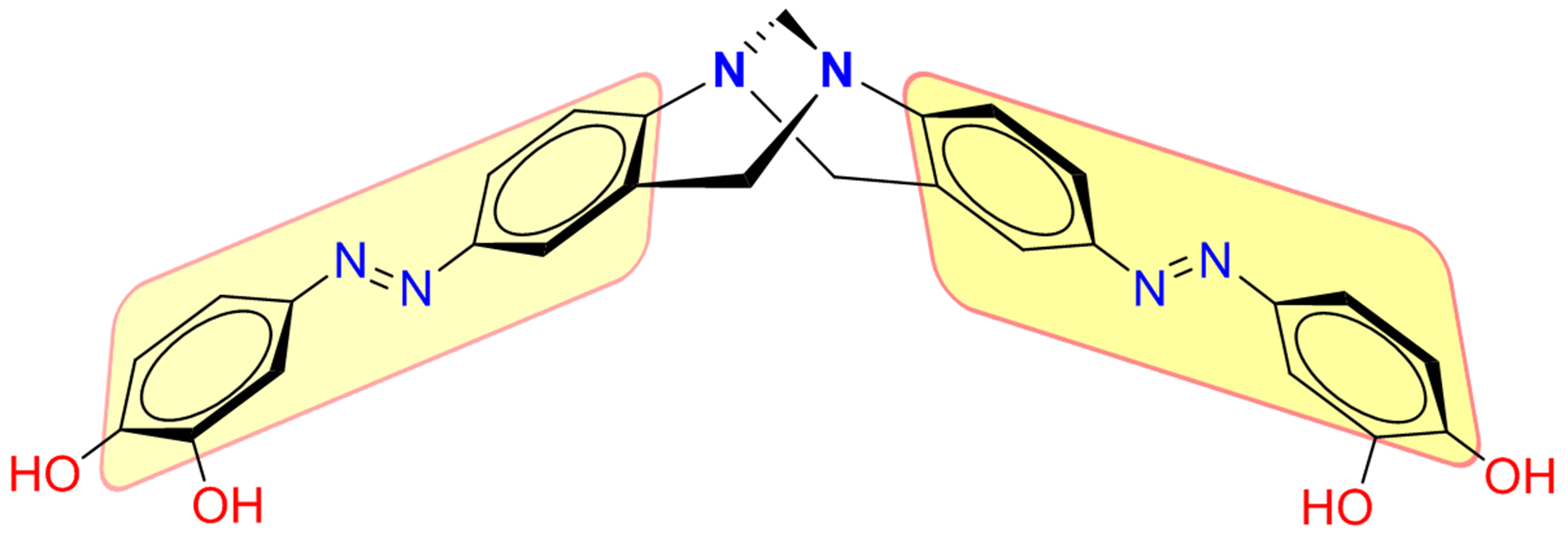
Bisazo Tröger's base analogs as molecular switches

Chromophore-carrying analogs of the Tröger's base have displayed NLO properties and can be used as molecular switches and liquid crystal dopants.

Spirocyclic analogues of Tröger's base (spiroTB) have been described.

== Synthesis ==
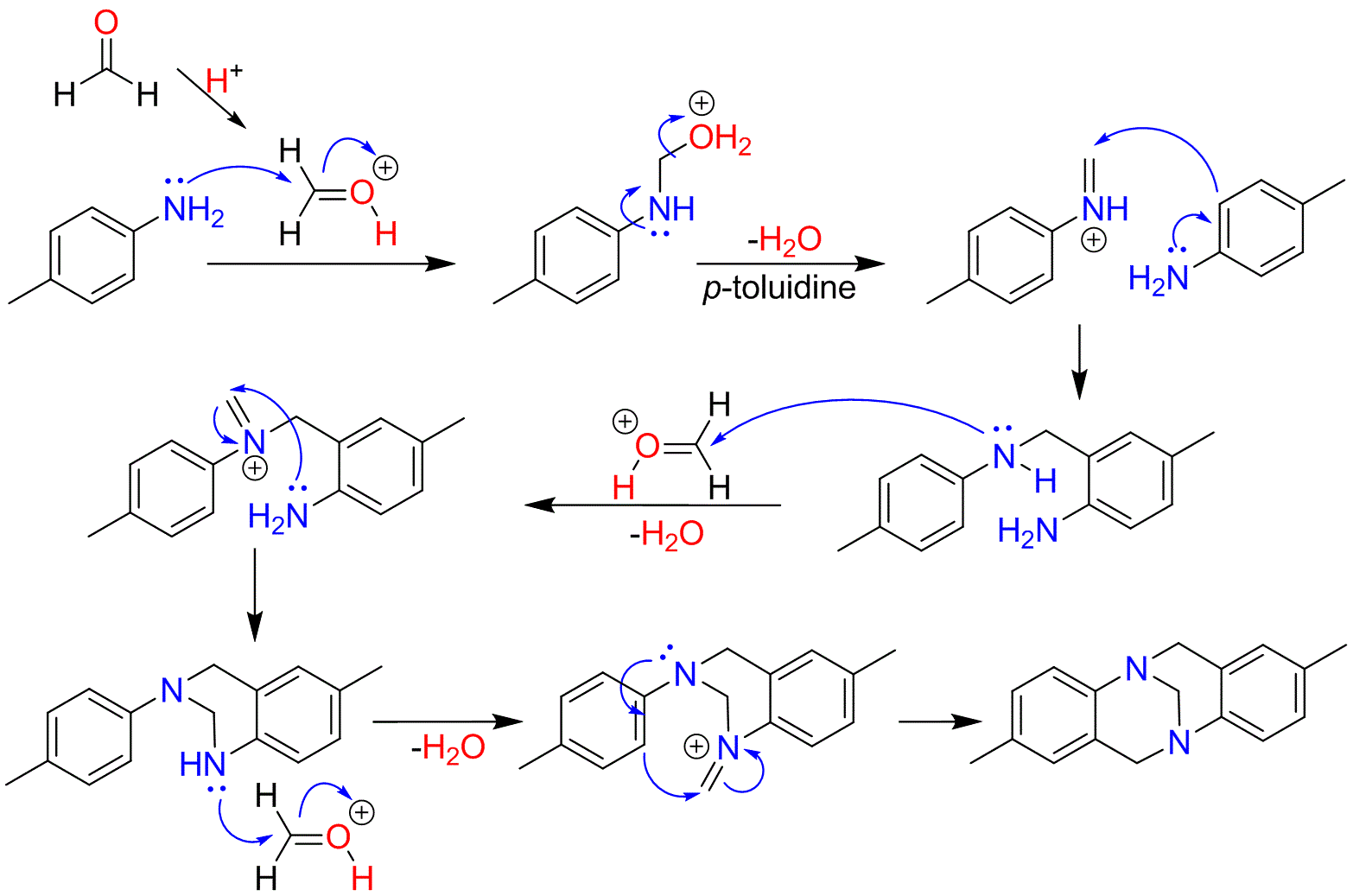
Mechanism of formation of Tröger's base

Tröger's base is of historic interest as was first synthesised in 1887 from p-toluidine and formaldehyde in an acidic solution by Julius Tröger. It can also be prepared with hydrochloric acid and dimethyl sulfoxide (DMSO) or hexamethylene tetraamine (HMTA) as formaldehyde replacement.

The reaction mechanism with DMSO as methylene donor for this reaction is similar to that of the Pummerer rearrangement. The interaction of DMSO and hydrochloric acid yields an electrophilic sulfenium ion that reacts with the aromatic amine in an electrophilic addition. Methanethiol is eliminated and the resulting imine reacts with a second amine. Sulfenium ion addition and elimination is repeated with the second amino group and the imine group reacts in an intramolecular electrophilic aromatic substitution reaction. Imine generation is repeated a third time and the reaction concludes with a second electrophilic substitution to the other aromat. Stereoselective, enantiospecific methods have also been introduced for the direct synthesis of optically active analogs of Tröger's base.
