= Staci Bilbo =

American neuroimmunologist

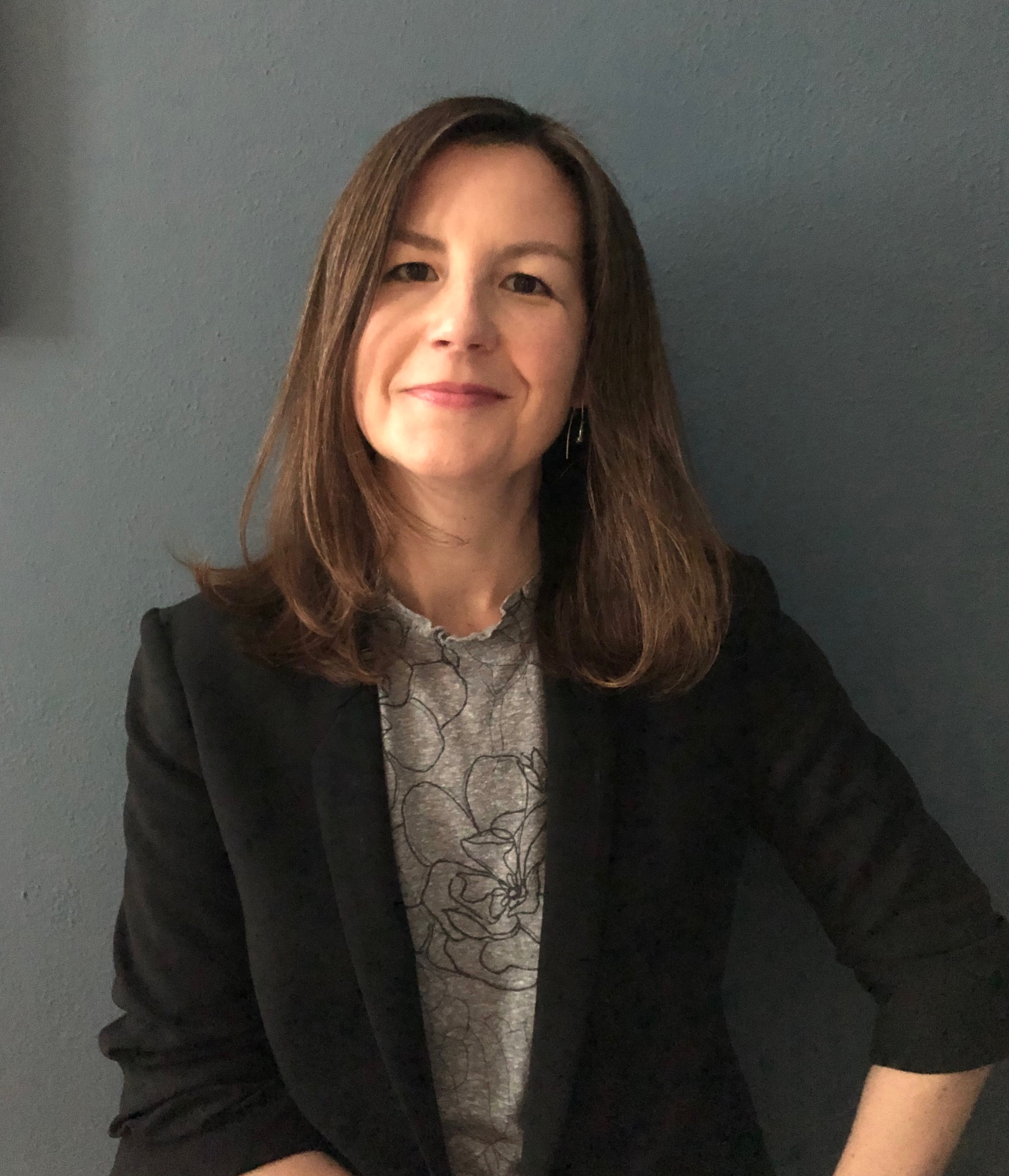
- Education: B.A. University of Texas at Austin, M.A. and Ph.D. Johns Hopkins University, Postdoctoral work University of Colorado
- Known for: Neonatal infection primes microglia
- Scientific career
- Fields: Neuroimmunology
- Workplaces: Duke University

Staci Bilbo is an American neuroimmunologist and The Haley Family Professor of Psychology and Neuroscience at Duke University. Bilbo also holds a position as a research affiliate at Massachusetts General Hospital overseeing research within the Lurie Center for Autism. As the principal investigator of the Bilbo Lab, Bilbo investigates how environmental challenges during the perinatal period impact the immune system and further influence brain development, cognition, and affective behaviors later in life.

== Education ==
Bilbo completed her undergraduate degree in psychology and biology at the University of Texas at Austin. She received her Bachelor of Arts in 1998, graduating with high honors. While Bilbo was at UT Austin, she conducted research on the role of the cholinergic system in learning in frogs.

After her undergraduate degree, Bilbo joined the lab of Randy Nelson at Johns Hopkins University. Bilbo completed her master's degree in 2000 and continued on to complete a PhD in Neuroendocrinology in Nelson's lab.

Bilbo's graduate work was largely involving the importance of social and environmental factors in the regulation of sex specific and seasonal changes in immune response. She published a paper how immune signalling influenced partner preferences in prairie voles in 1999, and another on how sex hormones impact immune function in male and female Siberian Hamsters in 2001. In 2002, Bilbo published a first author paper in the Proceedings of the Royal Society showing the effect of shortening photoperiods on the immune response of Siberian hamsters. Following this finding, Bilbo explored how photoperiods predict environmental conditions and immune trafficking in anticipation of infection. In 2002 Bilbo published a paper on the importance of melatonin in regulating immune response. In 2003, Bilbo published a paper on the sex differences in immune responses to photoperiod modulation.

== Career and research ==
After completing her graduate work, Bilbo pursued her postdoctoral work in neuroimmunology at the Center for Neuroscience at the University of Colorado in 2003. Her research work here was concerned with the effects of neonatal bacterial infection on memory impairment in adult rats. In 2007, Bilbo was appointed to assistant professor of psychology and neuroscience at Duke University. Bilbo remained on the faculty at Duke, leading the Developmental Neuroimmunology Lab until 2016. During her time at Duke, Bilbo investigated neuroimmune interactions in brain development, and the effect of neonatal infection on glial cell biology and immune functions later in life.

In 2016, Bilbo joined the faculty at Harvard Medical School and became the Lurie Family Associate Professor of Pediatric and Neuroscience as well as the director of research for the Lurie Center for Autism at the Massachusetts General Hospital for Children. During this time she did research on the effect of adolescent exposure to morphine on long-term microglial gene expression. She also studied the effect of environmental pollutant exposure during critical periods of prenatal development on metabolic, behavioral, and neuroinflammatory developments in adult offspring. In 2018, Bilbo and her lab studied the role of microglia in the regulation of social behavior in adolescent rats. Following these findings, Bilbo wrote a review paper highlighting the understudied connections between the immune system, social behavior, and dopaminergic circuitry.

Bilbo returned to Duke in July 2019 to hold the title of Haley Family Professor of Psychology and Neuroscience while still collaborating with the Lurie Center and other researchers in Boston.

Bilbo remains active in the scientific community as an editorial board member for Brain, Behavior, and Immunity, an invited journal editor for Brain, Behavior, and Immunity, and as a previous guest editor for Hormones and Behavior. Bilbo is also actively involved in outreach in the Duke community and recently gave a talk geared towards raising the visibility of female scientists and to encourage female participation in STEM.

== Awards and honors ==
- 2013 – Bass Connections Team Leader – Brain and Society Theme
- 2013 – Glenn Hatton Lecture – UC Riverside Center for Glial-Neuronal Interactions
- 2011 – Frank Beach Young Investigator Award, Society for Behavioral Neuroendocrinology
- 2010 – Robert Ader New Investigator Award, PsychoNeuroImmunology Research Society
- 2010 – Duke Institute for Brain Sciences Research Incubator Award
- 2002, 2004, 2005 – PsychoNeuroImmunology Research Society Travel Award
- 2003 – NIMH National Research Service Award, postdoctoral fellow 2005–2008
- 2003 – Women in Neuroscience Travel Award
- 2002 – American Psychological Assoc. Science Directorate Dissertation Research Award
- 1998 – Graduation with Honors and Special Honors in Psychology, The University of Texas

== Select publications ==
- Bilbo, SD, Levkoff, LH, Mahoney, JH, Maier, SF Rudy, JW, Watkins, LR. (2005) Neonatal infection induces memory impairments following an immune challenge in adulthood. Behavioral neuroscience 119 (1), 293
- Bilbo, SD, Biedenkapp, JC, Der-Avakian, A, Rudy, JW, Watkins, LR. (2005) Neonatal infection-induced memory impairment after lipopolysaccharide in adulthood is prevented via caspase-1 inhibition. Journal of Neuroscience 25 (35), 8000-8009
- Bilbo, SD, Bowers, SL, Dhabhar, FS, Nelson, RJ. (2008) Stressor-specific alterations in corticosterone and immune responses in mice. Brain, behavior, and immunity 22 (1), 105-113
- Bilbo, SD, Schwarz, JM. (2009) Early-life programming of later-life brain and behavior: A critical role for the immune system. Frontiers in Behavioral Neuroscience, 3, 14, 1–14.
- Bilbo, SD, Tsang V. (2010) Enduring consequences of maternal obesity for brain inflammation and behavior of offspring. The FASEB Journal 24 (6), 2104-2115
- Bilbo, SD, Mistry, RS, Smith, SH, Sholar, PW, Williamson, LL. (2011) Microglia and memory: modulation by early-life infection Journal of Neuroscience 31 (43), 15511-15521
- Bilbo, SD, Schwarz, JM. (2012) The immune system and developmental programming of brain and behavior. Frontiers in neuroendocrinology 33 (3), 267-286
- Bilbo, SD, Sholar, PW, Schwarz, JM. (2012) Sex differences in microglial colonization of the developing rat brain. Journal of neurochemistry 120 (6), 948-963
- Block, ML, Elder, A, Auten, RL, Bilbo, SD, Chen, H, Chen, JC. (2012) The outdoor air pollution and brain health workshop. Neurotoxicology 33 (5), 972-984
- Bilbo, SD, Schwarz, JM. (2012) Sex, glia, and development: interactions in health and disease. Hormones and behavior 62 (3), 243-253
