= Randy Jackson (disambiguation) =

Randy Jackson (born 1956) is an American musician, record producer and former judge on American Idol.

Randy Jackson may also refer to:

== Music ==
- Randy Jackson (Jacksons singer) (born 1961), former member of the Jacksons
- Randy Jackson (Zebra) (born 1955), American guitarist and lead singer of the rock band Zebra

== Sports ==
- Randy Jackson (baseball) (1926–2019), American baseball player of the 1950s
- Randy Jackson (offensive lineman) (born 1944), American football player of the 1960s and 1970s
- Randy Jackson (running back) (1948–2010), former NFL football player
- Randy Jackson (runner), winner of the 1980 NCAA DI steeplechase championship
