= Randy Pierce =

Randy Pierce may refer to:

- Randy Pierce (ice hockey), Canadian ice hockey player
- Randy G. Pierce, Supreme Court of Mississippi judge
