= Randy Robbins =

Randy Robbins may refer to:

- Randy Robbins (American football) (born 1962), former NFL football player
- Randy Robbins (director), American television director
