= Randy Dickens =

American football coach

Biographical details
- Education: Indiana

Coaching career (HC unless noted)
- 1975–1977: Indiana (GA)
- 1982–1985: Rose-Hulman (OC)
- 1986–1990: Quincy
- 2002–2006: Quincy HS (IL)
- 2016–present: Quincy HS (IL) (DC)

Head coaching record
- Overall: 25–22–1 (college)

Clark Randy Dickens is an American football coach. He is currently an assistant coach at Quincy Senior High School in Quincy, Illinois. In 1986, he became the new head coach at Quincy University, which had previously disbanded football in 1953. Dickens remained at Quincy until 1990, compiling a career record of 25–22–1.

Dickens is the son of former Wofford, Wyoming and Indiana head coach Phil Dickens.

== Head coaching record ==
Year	Team	Overall	Conference	Standing	Bowl/playoffs
Quincy Hawks (National Association of Intercollegiate Athletics) (1986–1990)
1986	Quincy	5–3			
1987	Quincy	2–8			
1988	Quincy	5–5			
1989	Quincy	7–2–1			
1990	Quincy	6–4			
Quincy:		25–22–1			
Total:		25–22–1			
