= Randy Johnston =

Randy Johnston may refer to:

- Randy Johnston (ice hockey) (born 1958), Canadian ice hockey player
- Randy Johnston (model) (1988–2008), American model
- Randy Johnston (musician) (born 1956), American jazz guitarist

== See also ==
- Randy Johnson (disambiguation)
