= Randy Sweeney =

William Randolph 'Randy' Sweeney (born January 7, 1956) is an American research scientist and director for R&D at Altria/Philip Morris USA. After retirement in 2010, Sweeney then founded a consultant group working in the "internet of things", later becoming Chief Engineer for Critical Power Systems Inc, and more recently a technology startup entrepreneur.

== Biography ==
Sweeney was born in Richmond, Virginia and educated at the Virginia Tech. He graduated with a BS in electrical engineering in 1978.

Sweeney joined Philip Morris in 1978 directly after graduating, he began work in advanced digital process control, became a leader in human-machine interface, distributed network-centric control systems, artificial intelligence, machine vision systems and later was the principal technical lead in Digital Marketing Technology and the Identification Technologies R&D effort at Philip Morris USA. He has obtained over 60 patents in his field while working at Philip Morris.

He was also a member of the R&D staffs of Kraft Foods and the Miller Brewing Company, working in advanced digital marketing and technology enhanced product development.

Sweeney was one of the founders of the Wonderware International Users Group and served as its first president. He also served as an organizing chairman of the 1999 Usenix Embedded Systems Conference. Sweeney was also a founding board member of MIT's "AutoID Center," which centered on RFID technology and created the Electronic Product Code (EPC).

Following retirement in 2010, he served as a consultant to several companies in the areas of embedded "internet of things" technology and digital precision agriculture for Syngenta in Basel, Switzerland.

He became Chief Engineer of Critical Power Systems Inc. in 2014, supervising development of smart power systems for military and civilian use. In 2015, Sweeney was a founder and equity partner of GenUPS International, a smart power systems startup, where he also served as Director of Product Development.

Sweeney is a former adjunct professor of digital technology at Virginia Commonwealth University, and has previously been a speaker at the IEEE Richmond Section. In addition, Sweeney has spoken at workshops across the nation, including the RFID workshop at the University of Washington.

=== Personal ===
Sweeney is retired once more and currently lives in Richmond, Virginia with his wife.
