= Randy Johnson (Minnesota elected official) =

American politician

Member of the Hennepin County Board of Commissioners from the 5th district
- In office 1979–2017

Personal details
- Party: Republican
- Spouse: Polly
- Children: 2
- Education: Macalester College (BA); University of Minnesota (JD)

Randy Johnson is an American attorney and politician who served as a member of the Hennepin County Board of Commissioners from 1979 to 2017.

== Education ==
Johnson earned a Bachelor of Arts degree in political science from Macalester College and a Juris Doctor from the University of Minnesota Law School.

== Career ==
First elected in 1978, Johnson was re-elected to seven consecutive terms. He is the longest-serving commissioner since the county's founding in 1852. Johnson announced he would not seek reelection in the summer of 2016.

During his tenure, Johnson represented all or portions of the suburban cities of Bloomington, Chanhassen, Eden Prairie and Richfield.

Johnson served as chair of the county board of commissioners in 2008. He previously chaired the county board from 1997 through 2000, and from 2004 through 2007.

Johnson served as a member of the Federal Geographic Data Committee.
