= Randy Boyd =

Randy Boyd may refer to:

- Randy Boyd (ice hockey) (1962–2022), Canadian ice hockey defenceman
- Randy Boyd (politician) (born 1954), member of the Mississippi House of Representatives
- Randy Boyd (writer) (born 1962), American novelist
- Randy Boyd (university president) (born 1959), American entrepreneur and academic administrator
