= Quarterly Journal of Political Science =

Quarterly peer-reviewed academic journal

- Discipline: Political science
- Language: English
- Edited by: Anthony Fowler; Stephane Wolton

Publication details
- History: 2006–present
- Publisher: Now Publishers (Netherlands)
- Frequency: Quarterly
- Impact factor: 1.645 (2015)

Standard abbreviations
- ISO 4: Q. J. Political Sci.
- NLM: Quart J Polit Sci

Indexing
- ISSN: 1554-0634 (print); 1554-0626 (web)
- LCCN: 2005212000
- OCLC no.: 57357627

Links
- Journal homepage

Quarterly Journal of Political Science is a quarterly peer-reviewed academic journal which began in 2006. It is published by Now Publishers Inc. and focuses on positive political science and contemporary political economy. The journal's joint editors-in-chief are Anthony Fowler (University of Chicago) and Stephane Wolton (London School of Economics).

== Abstracting and indexing ==
- Current Contents/Social and Behavioural Sciences
- EBSCO Discovery Service
- EconLit
- ISI SCI
- JEL
- RePEc
- SCOPUS
- Social Sciences Citation Index
- Summon by Serials Solutions

According to the Journal Citation Reports, the journal has a 2015 impact factor of 1.645, ranking it 33rd out of 163 journals in the category "Political Science".
