= Randy Miller =

Randy Miller may refer to:

- Randy Miller (baseball) (born 1953), American baseball pitcher
- Randy Miller (composer), American composer
- Randy Miller (musician) (1971–2010), American musician and drummer
- Randy Miller (pole vaulter) (born 1973), American pole vaulter, 1998 All-American for the Purdue Boilermakers track and field team
- Randy Miller (politician), American politician from Oregon
