= Randy Clark =

Randy Clark may refer to:

- Randy Clark (American football) (born 1957), American football tackle
- Randy Clark (boxer), American boxer

== See also ==
- Randy Clarke (drummer), drummer for Out of My Mind / Holy Water
- Randy Clarke, general manager and CEO of the Washington Metropolitan Area Transit Authority
- Randolph Clark, founder of Texas Christian University
