= Randy Garber =

Randy Garber may refer to:

- Randy Garber (politician) (born 1951), member of the Kansas House of Representatives
- Randy Garber (soccer) (born 1952), American soccer midfielder
