= Randy Jones =

Randy or Randall Jones may refer to:

== Sports ==
- Randy Jones (baseball) (1950–2025), American baseball player
- Randy Jones (bobsleigh) (born 1969), American bobsledder
- Randy Jones (ice hockey) (born 1981), Canadian hockey defenseman

== Other ==
- Randy Jones (drummer) (1944–2016), British-born American jazz musician
- Randy Jones (singer) (born 1952), former member of the Village People
