= Julius Tröger =

German chemist (1862–1942)

- Born: 10 October 1862; Leipzig, Kingdom of Saxony
- Died: 29 July 1942 (aged 79); Brunswick, Germany
- Education: University of Leipzig
- Known for: Tröger's base
- Scientific career
- Fields: organic chemistry
- Workplaces: Braunschweig University of Technology
- Doctoral advisor: Ernst von Meyer

Julius Tröger (10 October 1862 – 29 July 1942) was a German chemist.

Tröger studied at the University of Leipzig from 1882 till 1888. During his Ph.D. he synthesized in 1887 2,8-dimethyl-6H,12H-5,11-methanodibenzo-[b,f][1,5]diazocine from p-toluidine and formaldehyde. This substance is now known as the Tröger's base. Because he was not able to give a structure of the new compound Johannes Wislicenus, the new director of the department, assigned a mediocre grade for Trögers thesis. It took another 48 years to confirm the structure of Tröger's base. In 1888 he started working at the Braunschweig University of Technology where he stayed until his retirement in 1928. Tröger died in Brunswick.
