= Randy Thomas =

Randy Thomas may refer to:

- Randy Thomas (American football) (born 1976), American football player
- Randy Thomas (cricketer) (born 1982), Barbadian cricketer
- Randy Thomas (musician) (born 1954), American Christian musician
