= Randy Fuller =

Randy Fuller may refer to:

- Randy Fuller (American football) (born 1970), American football player
- Randy Fuller (musician) (1944–2024), American rock singer, songwriter, and bass player
