= Randy Hunt (American football) =

American football player and coach

Playing career
- 1971–1974: Glenville State

Coaching career (HC unless noted)
- 1981–1983: Glenville State (assistant HC)
- 1984: Glenville State (interim HC)
- 1990–1991: Glenville State (DC)
- 2009–2011: Greensboro

Head coaching record
- Overall: 14–25

Randall Hunt is an American former college football coach and professor. He served as the interim head football coach at Glenville State College in 1984 and as the head football coach at Greensboro College from 2009 to 2011, compiling a career head coaching record of 14–25. Hunt graduated in 1975 from Glenville State, where he was a four-year player for the Pioneers football team. He earned Master of Science and Doctor of Education degree from West Virginia University. Hunt joined the faculty of Greensboro College in 1991, where he was a professor of exercise and sport studies and chair the school's Department of Kinesiology before his retirement in 2018.

== Head coaching record ==
Year	Team	Overall	Conference	Standing	Bowl/playoffs
Glenville State Pioneers (West Virginia Intercollegiate Athletic Conference) (1984)
1984	Glenville State	6–3	5–3	4th	
Glenville State:		6–3	5–3		
Greensboro Pride (USA South Athletic Conference) (2009–2011)
2009	Greensboro	6–4	4–3	T–3rd	
2010	Greensboro	2–8	1–6	T–7th	
2011	Greensboro	0–10	0–7	8th	
Greensboro:		8–22	5–16		
Total:		14–25			
