= Vera Troeger =

German political scientist

- Education: University of Heidelberg; University of Konstanz
- Scientific career
- Fields: Political science
- Workplaces: University of Exeter; University of Warwick; University of Hamburg

Vera Troeger is a German political scientist. She holds the Chair of Comparative Political Science at the University of Hamburg. She studies quantitative methods in political science, the gender pay gap, and parental leave policies. In 2019 she was elected President of the European Political Science Association.

== Education and early work ==
Troeger obtained a Vordiplom in political science and French literature from the University of Heidelberg in 1997, and then another Vordiplom in statistics and econometrics and one in economics from the University of Konstanz in 2001. She continued to study at the University of Kostanz, earning a master's degree in political science, economics, and statistics in 2002. Her Masters thesis was entitled Determinants of the Functional Composition of Government Spending in Germany since 1962: A Quantitative Analysis. She then pursued a PhD at the University of Kostanz, completing it in 2007 with the dissertation Twisted Politics: The Domestic and International Roots of Tax Policies.

In 2005, Troeger joined the political science faculty at the University of Exeter, remaining there until 2011. In 2011 she moved to the University of Warwick, and then in 2019 to the University of Hamburg. She has also held visiting or temporary positions at University of Oxford, ETH Zurich, Duke University, the Max Planck Institute of Economics, and Harvard University.

== Career ==
Troeger's research focuses on issues like the gender pay gap and how parental leave policies affect economic productivity. She also studies political methodology, including issues concerning panel data and fixed effects modeling.

In 2019, Troeger was elected President of the European Political Science Association for the 2019–2021 term. She had previously been the editor-in-chief of the European Political Science Association's flagship journal, Political Science Research and Methods, as well as an editor of Political Analysis.

Troeger's work has been cited in media outlets like The Guardian, The Washington Post, and Times Higher Education. Her decision to leave Britain after Brexit, after working for 14 years in the United Kingdom, was the focus of an article by The Guardian.

== Selected works ==
- "Panel data analysis in comparative politics: Linking method to theory", European Journal of Political Research, with Thomas Plümper and Philip Manow (2005)
- "Efficient Estimation of Time-Invariant and Rarely Changing Variables in Finite Sample Panel Analyses with Unit Fixed Effects", Political Analysis, with Thomas Plümper (2007)
- "Why is There No Race to the Bottom in Capital Taxation?", International Studies Quarterly, with Thomas Plümper and Hannes Winner (2009)
