= Randy Wood =

Randy Wood may refer to:

- Randy Wood (artist) (born 1970), American artist
- Randy Wood (ice hockey) (born 1963), American ice hockey player
- Randy Wood (music executive) (1929–1980), American head of Vee-Jay Records and founder of Mira Records
- Randy Wood (politician) (born 1947), member of the Alabama House of Representatives
- Randy Wood (record producer) (1917–2011), American recording executive; founder of Dot Records
- Randy Wood, cofounder of Northern Cree Singers

== See also ==
- Randy Woods (born 1970), American basketball player
