= Piri Halasz =

American art critic, educator and writer

Piri Halasz (New York City, 1935) is an American art critic, educator and writer.

== Biography ==
The daughter of diet-book author Ruth West, and theatrical critic, screenwriter George Halasz (born in Budapest). She attended Barnard College, where she majored in English and served as the features editor of the Barnard Bulletin. She then went on to Time magazine where she was employed first as a researcher and next as a writer. In 1966, she wrote the famous cover story for the aforementioned periodical Swinging London. Subsequently, this led to her authoring a travel guide of the same name for Coward McCann first published in 1967 and reissued in 2010 under the iUniverse imprint as part of the Authors Guild "Back in Print" series. Between 1972 and 1975, she wrote on art and theater for the New Jersey edition of The New York Times.

In her later career, she wrote on art for among other publications The New York Observer. In addition to writing for various journals and penning her own volumes, she published a blog/print edition newsletter until 2023 called "From the Mayor's Doorstep" (alluding to her residence being in the shadow of Gracie Mansion).

As an educator, she has taught at Columbia University, Hunter College, CW Post College, Molloy College and Bethany College (West Virginia).

Halasz's autobiographical volume entitled A Memoir Of Creativity: Abstract Painting, Politics & The Media, 1956–2008 was published by iUniverse in 2009. Kenworth Moffett, in his review of the book, said that "A Memoir of Creativity by Piri Halasz is a witty, honest, scrupulously researched, and well written account of the author's life experiences and intellectual development."
