= Randy Hogan =

Randy Hogan may refer to:

- Randy Hogan (musician)
- Randy Hogan (wrestler)
