= Randy Walker =

Randy Walker may refer to:

- Randy Walker (American football coach) (1954–2006), American football player and coach, head coach at Miami University, 1990–1998, and Northwestern University, 1999–2005
- Randy Walker (punter) (born 1951), American football punter, played for Green Bay Packers in 1974
- Stretch (rapper) (1968–1995), American rapper, born Randy Walker

== See also ==
- John Randall Walker (1874–1942), U.S. political figure
