= Disappearance of Randy Sellers =

Unsolved 1980 missing-person case

Randy Sellers
- Sellers, c. 1980
- Born: Randy Lee Sellers; September 6, 1962
- Disappeared: August 16, 1980 (aged 17); Visalia, Kentucky
- Status: Missing for 46 years and 3 days
- Known for: Missing person
- Height: 5 ft 9 in (1.75 m) (approximate)
- Distinguishing features: Caucasian male. 149 pounds. Brown hair, hazel eyes.

Randy Sellers (born September 6, 1962) is an American missing person who disappeared at the age of 17 in Visalia, Kentucky on August 16, 1980. The last individuals known to have contact with him were two police officers who had taken him into custody for intoxication. The officers stated that they dropped Sellers a mile from his home, marking the last time he was seen. The investigation into the disappearance has explored various leads over the decades, but Sellers's whereabouts remain unknown. He is presumed dead by his parents, who later erected a headstone in his memory.

== Background ==
At the time of his disappearance, Sellers was characterized by the following features: a birthmark on the crown of his head, a scar above his left eye, and a surgical scar on his right knee. A tattoo of a crooked letter "R" was present on his forearm. In 2019, the National Center for Missing & Exploited Children released an age-progressed image of Sellers, depicting his possible appearance at age 49. Sellers was interested in becoming an ironworker, the same profession as his stepfather.

== Disappearance ==
Sellers went missing in August 1980, two weeks before his 18th birthday. He spent the night of his disappearance at a county fair in his hometown of Visalia, Kentucky. While at the fair, Sellers consumed alcohol and marijuana, impairing his ability to stand and leading to the police taking him into custody. Two police officers decided to take Sellers to his house after determining that he was a minor. The officers stated that Sellers attacked one of them during the drive and that he refused to identify his home. They dropped him from the patrol car near a railway overpass close to his home, which was the last time Sellers was known to have been seen. The two officers, however, offered conflicting accounts of their encounter with Sellers during the subsequent investigation, including the time and location of dropping Sellers off and his level of intoxication.

== Investigation ==
The search for Sellers began on August 17, 1980, after he did not return home. The initial search involved dragging the Licking River for his body, a waterway close to the site of the disappearance.

Around ten years later, in the early 1990s, an incarcerated serial killer, Donald Leroy Evans, stated that he had killed Sellers. The confession was one of several murders to which Evans confessed. While many of these confessions were dismissed as false, the one regarding Sellers was considered potentially credible. Evans alleged that he encountered Sellers hitchhiking on Decoursey Pike near the Sellers family home, picked him up, and drove to Kincaid Lake State Park. According to Evans, after sharing beers, he shot Sellers in the back of the head and buried him in a shallow grave. Authorities searched Kincaid Lake State Park using a map drawn by Evans but found no results. A renewed search in 2019, prompted by concerns that Evans's map might have been misread, also failed to find any evidence.

Investigators have also considered the possibility that the two police officers who last saw Sellers might be responsible for his disappearance. This line of inquiry gained traction in the early 2000s when a detective received a tip suggesting that Sellers was buried on a property connected with one of the two officers who had escorted Sellers home. One of the two officers admitted under requestioning that his colleague had struck Sellers, but after making this admission, he immediately attempted to withdraw it. There were also inconsistencies between the officers' stories regarding the sequence of events that night and the exact location where Sellers was dropped off.

== See also ==
- List of people who disappeared mysteriously: 1910–1990
