= Randy Kendrick =

American conservative political activist and philanthropist

Randy Kendrick is an American conservative political activist and donor. She is married to billionaire Ken Kendrick, the owner of the Arizona Diamondbacks.

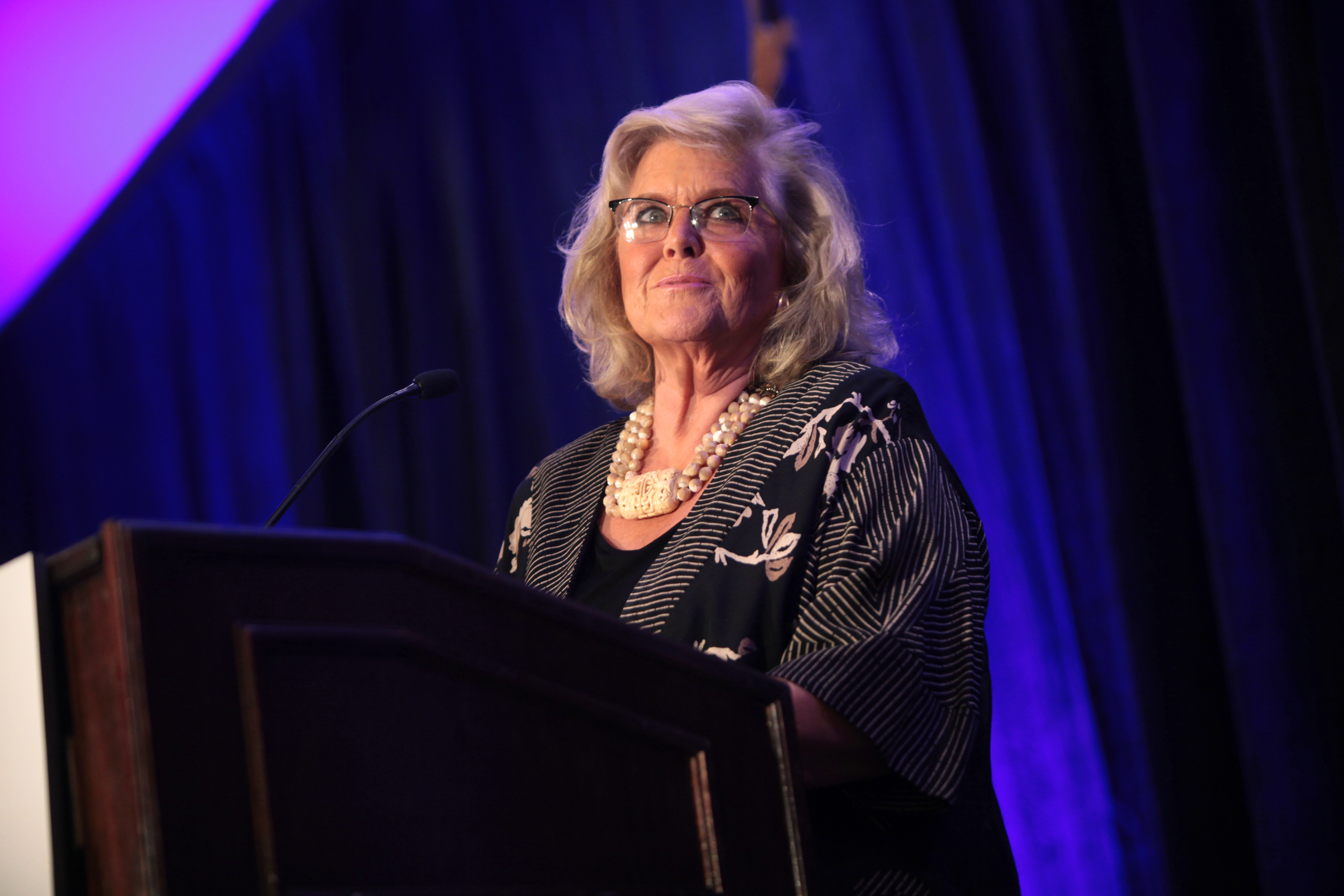
Randy Kendrick speaking at the Arizona Chamber of Commerce & Industry's Leadership Series luncheon on 6 May 2015.

== Career, activism, and philanthropy ==
Randy Kendrick began her career as a lawyer. She became a major donor in both Arizona and national politics.

Kendrick is a major donor to the University of Arizona's Center for the Philosophy of Freedom. She and her husband have donated over $2.5 million and sponsor an endowed chair at the center.

In 2009, Kendrick worked with Sean Noble of the Center to Protect Patient Rights, now known as American Encore, to oppose healthcare legislation proposed by President Barack Obama. According to Noble, Kendrick delivered a speech at a June 2009 Koch donor conference that resulted in more than $13 million in spontaneous donations.

During the 2016 election cycle, Kendrick was involved in an exchange with presidential candidate John Kasich. Kendrick was in the audience for a panel on which Kasich was speaking when she asked him why he had said that support for Medicaid expansion was what God wanted. Kasich responded that he believed he would be held responsible in the afterlife for his treatment of the poor. Kendrick contributed $100,000 to Our Principles PAC, a super PAC that financed political ads opposing 2016 Republican presidential nominee Donald Trump. Kendrick publicly denounced Trump in an interview with The Washington Post.

Kendrick contributed $100,000 to Arizonans for Responsible Drug Policy, a ballot measure committee that opposed the 2016 Arizona Marijuana Legalization Initiative, which proposed to legalize the possession and consumption of marijuana in the state by persons who are 21 years of age or older. As of 2020, Kendrick served on board of the libertarian Goldwater Institute.

== Family ==
Kendrick is the wife of Earl "Ken" Kendrick, owner of the Arizona Diamondbacks. Kendrick's father was an Air Force pilot. He was killed in a plane crash when Randy was ten years old. Her mother later married another pilot. She moved frequently as a child.

== Education ==
Kendrick was an undergraduate at Auburn University. Kendrick graduated from the Washington College of Law at American University.
