= Randy Castillo (dancer) =

Randy Castillo (born 1982) is a ballet dancer who performs with the LA Dance Project.

== Biography ==
Randy Castillo was born in 1982, in New York. He began dancing at the age of 11, first in Harbor Conservatory, then in Dance Theater of Harlem School. He then entered the Alvin Ailey School, the School of American Ballet and the Juilliard School.

He joined Compañia Nacional de Danza, in Madrid, then directed by Nacho Duato, from 2003 to 2004, and again, from 2006 to 2010. In 2005, he joined Semperoper ballet in Dresden in Deustchland.

From August 2010 to 2014, he performed with the Lyon Opera Ballet. In summer 2014, Benjamin Millepied recruited him for the LA Dance Project.

== Featured roles with Lyon Opera Ballet ==
- Christian Rizzo's "ni fleurs, ni ford-mustang",
- Benjamin Millepied's "Sarabande" and "This Part in Darkness",
- William Forsythe "Limb’s theorem",
- Jiří Kylián's One of a kind,
- Mats Ek's Giselle (Halbrecht).

== Featured roles with LA Dance Project ==
- Benjamin Millepied's "Untitled"
- Benjamin Millepied's "Reflections"
- Justin Peck's "Murder Ballades" ,
- William Forsythe"Quintett",
- Benjamin Millepied's"New work".
