= Randy Bennett (disambiguation) =

Randy Bennett (born 1962) is an American basketball coach.

Randy Bennett may also refer to:

- Randy Bennett (swimming coach) (1963–2015), Canadian swimming coach
- Randy Elliot Bennett (born 1952), American researcher
