= Randy Lewis (executive) =

American businessman and disability advocate

J. Randolph "Randy" Lewis (born c. 1950) is an American businessman, a disability employment advocate, and author.

Lewis is a former senior vice president of a Fortune 50 company, and board member of a national restaurant chain. He was the head of supply chain and logistics at Walgreens for 17 years until his retirement in 2013. Over his last ten years there, he created a program in its distribution centers to integrate large numbers of people with disabilities as equals into its workforce.

== Early life and education ==
Lewis was born in Texas circa 1950. He earned his Bachelor of Applied Arts degree in accounting in 1971, a Bachelor of Arts degree in economics in 1974, and a Master of Business Administration degree in finance in 1975, all from the University of Texas at Austin, located in Austin, Texas. Lewis joined the Peace Corps and was stationed in Peru.

== Career ==
=== Ernst & Young ===
Lewis was a Chicago-based partner at Ernst & Young and Walgreens was his client by the late 1980s. His primary client in 1992, Walgreens offered him a position.

=== Walgreens ===
Lewis joined Walgreens in 1992 as divisional vice president, logistics and planning and promoted to vice president to head its supply chain in 1996. He was promoted to senior vice president in 1999. During his time there, Walgreens expanded from 1,500 to 8,000 stores. When he took over in 1996, Walgreens began to contract outside agencies that employed people with disabilities in its distribution centers on a limited basis, typically in non-production areas.

==== List of other companies who have implemented this program ====
- Best Buy
- C. & J. Clark (traded as Clarks)
- Lowe's
- Marks & Spencer
- Meijer
- OfficeMax
- Procter & Gamble
- Sears

== Personal life ==
His son, Austin, has autism which may have led Lewis to note the importance of employment for those with disabilities.

== Recognition ==
- Brain & Behavior Research Foundation (then NARSAD) first Productive Lives Award – 2009
- Milton P. Levy Jr. Outstanding Volunteer Award Winner (Special Care & Career Services) – 2010
- Walgreens recognized as Private-Sector Employer of the Year for People with Disabilities – 2010
- Leader of the Year – Human Resources Management Association of Chicago – 2010
- Walgreens recognized as Diversity Council Honors Award Winner – 2011
- Human Spirit Award from Georgetown University Conference on Employment of People With Disabilities – 2013

== Books, talks, and miscellaneous ==
- No Greatness Without Goodness: How a Father's Love Changed a Company and Sparked a Movement by Randy Lewis
- Lewis has a contribution in the book Able! How One Company's Extraordinary Workforce Changed the Way We Look at Disability Today by Nancy Henderson
- Testimony before the Committee on Health, Education, Labor and Pensions on March 2, 2011, at 10 a.m. transcript and full hearing video
- Business & Disability: Walgreens – Randy Lewis on integration of people with disabilities
- "Employees at This Walgreens Distribution Center Are More Able Than Disabled", ABC News
- "Walgreens Program Puts 'Able' in Disabled", NBC News

== See also ==
- List of people from Chicago
- List of University of Texas at Austin alumni
