= Randy Gregg =

Randy Gregg is the name of:

- Randy Gregg (ice hockey) (born 1956)
- Randy Gregg (musician) (20th century), bass guitarist
