= Randy White =

Randy White may refer to:

- Randy White (American football) (born 1953), American football player
- Randy White (basketball) (born 1967), American basketball player
- Randy White (Canadian politician) (born 1948), Canadian politician and accountant
- Dr. Randy White (pastor) (born 1965), American pastor of First Baptist Church, Taos, New Mexico; founder of Randy White Ministries, Dispensational Publishing House Inc., and John Nelson Darby Academy, 3rd-12th online biblical education
- Randy White (pastor) (born 1958), American pastor of Without Walls Central Church
- Randy White (West Virginia politician) (born 1955), West Virginia state senator
- Randy Wayne White (born 1950), American writer of crime fiction and non-fiction adventure
- Randy White (hurdler) (born 1950), American hurdler, 1971 All-American for the Stanford Cardinal track and field team

== See also ==
- Randy Wright, American football quarterback and color commentator
