= Randi =

- Gender: Mainly female with some male
- Language: Norwegian
- Name day: February 12 (Norway)

Origin
- Language: Norwegian
- Origin: 1. Miranda; 2. Randy; 3. Ragnfríðr (Norway)

Randi is both a given name, and a nickname in the English language, popular in North America and Norway. It is primarily a feminine name, although there is recorded usage of the name by men. It may have originated as a pet form of Miranda or as a feminine form of Randy.

In Norway, Randi is a feminine name that emerged in the 1400s as a short form of Ragnfrid (Old Norse: Ragnfríðr). The original meaning in Old Norse is "God-lovable". Ragnfríðr was famously used about three different people in runic inscriptions from the Viking era. Later the variant Rangdid was common in the Middle Ages. Over 20 people with the name were mentioned in the Regesta Norvegica. By the 1600s the variant Randi was a common feminine name in Norway.

== Women known as Randi ==
- Randi Altschul (born 1960), American toy inventor
- Randi Anda (1898–1999), Norwegian politician
- Randi Bakke (1904–1984), Norwegian pair skater
- Randi Becker (born 1948), American politician from Washington
- Randi Bjørgen (born 1947), Norwegian trade unionist
- Randi Blehr (1851–1928), Norwegian feminist
- Randi Brænne (1911–2004), Norwegian actress
- Randi Bratteli (1924–2002), Norwegian journalist
- Randi Elisabeth Dyrdal (fl. 1974–1977), Norwegian handballer
- Randi Hutter Epstein, American medical writer
- Randi Flesland (born 1955), Norwegian civil servant
- Randi Gaustad (born 1942), Norwegian curator and art historian
- Randi Gustad (born 1977), Norwegian handball player
- Randi Hansen (born 1958), Norwegian singer
- Randi Heide Steen (1909–1990), Norwegian singer
- Randi Helseth (1905–1991), Norwegian singer
- Randi Holwech (1890 – 1967), Norwegian scientist and painter.
- Randi Hultin (1926–2000), Norwegian jazz critic
- Randi Karlstrøm (born 1960), Norwegian politician
- Randi Kaye (born 1967), American journalist
- Randi Laubek (born 1973), Danish singer and songwriter
- Randi Leinan (born 1968), Norwegian footballer (soccer player)
- Randi Levine, American author, arts advocate, and diplomat
- Randi Lunnan (born 1963), Norwegian organizational theorist and professor
- Randi Martinsen, American geologist
- Randi Michelsen (1903–1981), Danish actress
- Randi Miller (born 1983), American wrestler
- Randi Monsen (1910–1997), Norwegian illustrator
- Randi Lindtner Næss (1905–2009), Norwegian actress and singer
- Randi Oakes (born 1951), American actress and fashion model
- Randi Øverland (born 1952), Norwegian politician
- Randi Rahm, American fashion designer
- Randi Rhodes (born 1959), American radio personality
- Randi Mayem Singer, American writer and producer
- Randi Solem (1775–1859), Norwegian religious organiser
- Randi Malkin Steinberger (born 1960), American photographer, filmmaker, author, and curator
- Randi Thorvaldsen (1925–2011), Norwegian speedskater
- Randi Vestergaard Evaldsen (born 1984), Greenlandic politician
- Wang Randi (born 1991), Chinese swimmer
- Randi Wardum (born 1986), Faroese football goalkeeper and handballer
- Randi Weingarten (born 1957), American trade union leader
- Randi Zuckerberg (born 1982), American businesswoman

== Men known as Randi ==
- Randi Goteni (born 1995), Congolese professional footballer
- Randi Patterson (born 1985), American footballer
- Randi J. Rost (born 1960), computer graphics professional and frequent contributor of graphics standards

== Fictional characters ==
- Randi Fronczak, desk clerk in the medical drama ER
- Randi Hubbard, All My Children character
- Randi McFarland, character on the TV show Highlander
- Randi, the main protagonist of the video game Secret of Mana
- Randi, assistant to Jimmy and Kayla on the HBO comedy Hacks
