= Randy Scott =

Randy Scott may refer to:

- Randy Scott (American football) (born 1959), American football linebacker
- Randy Scott (politician) (1946–2015), member of the South Carolina Senate
- Randy Scott (sportscaster), an American sportscaster who currently works for ESPN. He previously served as a sports anchor for WNUR sports radio
- Randolph Scott (1898–1987), American actor
