= Randy Gordon =

Randy Gordon may refer to:

- Randy Gordon (boxing), American boxing journalist, commentator, and administrator
- Randy Gordon (politician), member of the Washington Senate
