= Randy Edmunds =

Randy Edmunds may refer to:

- Randy Edmunds (American football) (born 1946), American football linebacker
- Randy Edmunds (politician), Canadian politician in Newfoundland and Labrador
