= Randy Channell Soei =

Japanese tea ceremony host

- Born: Victoria, British Columbia
- Education: Urasenke Gakuen Professional College, Kyoto, Japan
- Occupations: Tea master, martial artist, author
- Website: ranhotei.com

Randy Channell Soei is a Canadian tea master, author, martial artist, and professor of the Urasenke tradition. His life is filled with Japanese culture and the pursuit of martial arts. He is one of the few non-Japanese citizens to conduct tea ceremonies and teach about this topic. Channell embarked on a transformative journey that began with his passion for martial arts. He travelled from Canada to Hong Kong before finally moving to Japan.

== Early life and education ==
Channell was born and grew up in Victoria, British Columbia. After completing his early education, he moved to Edmonton and attended Concordia College. During this time, he developed an interest in martial arts and began training in various disciplines such as kickboxing, taekwondo, and wing chun.

Channell left Canada to study kung-fu in Hong Kong. While there he decided to further his martial arts skills and traveled to Japan. He settled in Matsumoto in Nagano Prefecture, where he spent a decade training in Japanese budō, including disciplines like kendo, judo, iaido (sword drawing), and naginata.

Later, he moved to Kyoto to pursue his studies in chadō, the traditional Japanese Way of tea, at the Urasenke Gakuen Professional College of Chado. From 1993 to 1996, he learned the history and practice of the tea ceremony, deepening his knowledge and skills in this traditional art form. Upon graduating from the Urasenke College, Channell began teaching and sharing his knowledge as a tea master. He lectures throughout Japan, sharing his deep understanding of the tea ceremony and its cultural significance to his audiences. In addition to his regular lessons at Nashinoki Shrine, he also lectures both Japanese and non-Japanese individuals on the Way of Tea. He received his "tea name," Soei, in 1999 and became one of the few foreigners licensed to teach this traditional art form.

== Career ==
As a tea master Soei conducts lectures and lessons on the way of tea throughout Japan. He shares his expertise and knowledge, offering insights into the cultural significance, rituals, and philosophy behind the tea ceremony. Soei's teachings encompass traditional practices as well as contemporary interpretations, making the art accessible and relevant to a diverse range of individuals. In addition to his role as a tea master, Soei has authored books and publications about the intricacies of the tea ceremony. His writings offer insights, guidance, and interpretations of the way of tea, contributing to the preservation and dissemination of this ancient art form.

== See also ==
- History of tea in Japan
- Japanese tea utensils
- Chashitsu
