= Randy West =

Randy West may refer to:

- Randy West (actor) (1947–2024), American pornographic actor and director
- Randy West (photographer) (born 1960), American photographer
- Randy West, announcer of Supermarket Sweep
