= Randy Ellis =

2015 Fellow of the Institute of Electrical and Electronics Engineers

Randy E. Ellis
- Born: 3 May 1956 (age 70)
- Education: University of Massachusetts at Amherst
- Scientific career
- Fields: Computer Science, Computer Assisted Surgery
- Workplaces: Queen's University, Harvard Medical School

Randy Ellis is a professor and Queen's Research Chair in Computer Assisted Surgery in the School of Computing Queen's University in Kingston, Ontario. He was named Fellow of the Institute of Electrical and Electronics Engineers (IEEE) in 2015 for contributions to image guided surgical technology. He is also a Fellow of the American Society of Mechanical Engineers (ASME).

== Career ==
Prior to arriving at Queen's University, Ellis was an associate professor of radiology at Harvard Medical School. In 2016-2017 he was awarded the August-Wilhelm Scheer Visiting Professorship at the Technical University of Munich. Ellis holds 6 patents.
