= Randy Hoffman =

American golf coach and college athletics administrator

Biographical details
- Born: c. 1952

Playing career
- c. 1970: Maryland

Administrative career (AD unless noted)
- 1987–1990: San Jose State
- 1990–1994: Idaho State

Randall Gary Hoffman (born c. 1952) is an American former college athletics administrator and golf coach. He served as the athletic director at San Jose State University from 1987 to 1990 and at Idaho State University from 1990 to 1994.

== Biography ==
Hoffman is a native of Lewisburg, Pennsylvania. He graduated in 1969 from Lewisburg High School, where he captained the football, basketball, and golf teams. He lettered for two seasons on the golf team at University of Maryland, College Park, before graduating in 1974. He later served as head golf coach and associate athletic director at Maryland.

In June 1990, Hoffman accepted a one-year contract, paying an annual salary $70,000, to become the athletic director at Idaho State University. He resigned from that position in December 1994 to move into private business in Atlanta, Georgia.
