= Randy Avent =

American computer scientist

Randy K. Avent is an American computer scientist and academic administrator. He is the inaugural President of Florida Polytechnic University. In 2015 he was named Fellow of the Institute of Electrical and Electronics Engineers (IEEE) for leadership in automatic target recognition technology.
