= Electoral Studies =

Academic journal

- Discipline: Political science
- Language: English
- Edited by: Oliver Heath, Kaat Smets

Publication details
- History: 1982-present
- Publisher: Elsevier (United Kingdom)
- Frequency: Bi-monthly
- Impact factor: 1.817 (2018)

Standard abbreviations
- ISO 4: Elect. Stud.

Indexing
- ISSN: 0261-3794 (print); 1873-6890 (web)
- LCCN: 84641833
- OCLC no.: 644057930

Links
- Journal homepage; Online access

Electoral Studies is an international bi-monthly peer-reviewed academic journal dedicated to the study of elections and voting. It was first established in 1982 by David Butler (Nuffield College, Oxford) and Bo Särlvik (University of Essex) and is widely recognised as a major journal in the field of political science. It is housed at Royal Holloway, University of London and is published by Elsevier (formerly Butterworths and Butterworth-Heinemann). The current editors-in-chief as of January 2018 are Oliver Heath (Royal Holloway, University of London) and Kaat Smets (Royal Holloway, University of London) and the former long-standing editors-in-chief were Harold Clarke (University of Texas at Dallas) and Geoffrey Evans (Nuffield College, Oxford).

According to the Journal Citation Reports, the journal has a 2020 impact factor of 2.070, ranking it 88th out of 182 journals in the category "Political Science".

According to Google Scholar Metrics, the journal has an h-index of 37, ranking it 23rd in the category "Political Science".

== Editors-in-Chief ==
- 1982–1992 – David Butler (Nuffield College, Oxford)
- 1982–1998 – Bo Särlvik (University of Essex) and from 1983 (University of Gothenburg)
- 1995–2017 – Harold D Clarke (University of North Texas) and from 2002 (University of Texas at Dallas)
- 1999–2017 – Geoffrey Evans (Nuffield College, Oxford)
- 2018–Present – Oliver Heath (Royal Holloway, University of London)
- 2018–Present – Kaat Smets (Royal Holloway, University of London)

== Other Editors ==
- 1992–1999 – Iain McLean (Nuffield College, Oxford)
- 1999–2009 – Elinor Scarbrough (University of Essex)
- 2009–2013 – Robert Johns (University of Strathclyde)
- 2013–2016 – Thomas Scotto (University of Essex)

== See also ==
- List of political science journals
