= Randi Gaustad =

Norwegian curator and art historian (born 1942)

Randi Gaustad (born 29 January 1942) is a Norwegian curator and art historian.

She was born in Oslo and took the mag.art. degree in 1973. She was a research assistant at the University of Oslo from 1974 to 1978, subeditor for the encyclopedia Norsk kunstnerleksikon from 1978 to 1983 and curator at the Norwegian Museum of Decorative Arts and Design since 1983. Important books include Gammelt norsk stentøy fra Egersund (1980) and Samtidskeramikk: Norsk keramikk fra 1940 til i dag (1990 with Gunnar Danbolt).
