= The Journal of Politics =

Peer-reviewed academic journal

- Discipline: Political science
- Language: English
- Edited by: Vera Troeger

Publication details
- History: 1939–present
- Publisher: University of Chicago Press on behalf of the Southern Political Science Association (United States)
- Frequency: Quarterly

Standard abbreviations
- ISO 4: J. Politics
- NLM: J Polit

Indexing
- ISSN: 0022-3816 (print); 1468-2508 (web)
- LCCN: 41016606
- JSTOR: 00223816
- OCLC no.: 38309773

Links
- Journal homepage; Online access; Online archive

The Journal of Politics is a peer-reviewed academic journal of political science established in 1939 and published quarterly (February, May, August and November) by University of Chicago Press on behalf of the Southern Political Science Association. It is widely considered one of the top 3 journals in political science.

According to the Journal Citation Reports, the journal has a 2024 impact factor of 3.8.

== See also ==
- List of political science journals
