= Political Analysis (journal) =

- Discipline: Political science
- Language: English
- Edited by: Daniel Hopkins and Brandon Stewart

Publication details
- History: 1990–present
- Publisher: Cambridge University Press (United States)
- Frequency: Quarterly
- Impact factor: 4.7 (2023)

Standard abbreviations
- ISO 4: Political Anal.

Indexing
- ISSN: 1047-1987 (print); 1476-4989 (web)
- LCCN: 90649282
- OCLC no.: 710017963

Links
- Journal homepage; Online access; Online archive

Political Analysis is a quarterly peer-reviewed academic journal of political science published quarterly by Cambridge University Press and the Society for Political Methodology. The journal puts emphasis on the quantitative work in political methodology. According to the Journal Citation Reports, the journal has a 2023 impact factor of 4.7, ranking it 9th out of 317 journals in the category "Political Science". Its current editor is Daniel Hopkins (University of Pennsylvania) and Brandon Stewart (Princeton University).

== See also ==
- List of political science journals
