= John Aldrich (political scientist) =

American political scientist and author

- Citizenship: American
- Education: Allegheny College (BA), University of Rochester (MA, PhD)
- Occupation: Political scientist
- Employer: Duke University

John Herbert Aldrich (born 1947) is an American political scientist and author, known for his research and writings on American politics, elections, and political parties, and on formal theory and methodology in political science.

== Education and career ==
Aldrich graduated with a B.A. in political science from Allegheny College in 1969. He attended graduate school at the University of Rochester, completing an M.A. in 1971 and a PhD degree in 1975. Aldrich taught at Michigan State University from 1974 to 1981 and at the University of Minnesota from 1981 to 1987, when he joined the faculty at Duke University as a professor of political science.

Aldrich won the Heinz Eulau Award in 1990 for the best article in the American Political Science Review. His book Why Parties? (1995) received the Gladys Kammerer Award from the American Political Science Association for the best book on U.S. national politics.

Aldrich was co-editor of the American Journal of Political Science from 1985 to 1988 and was elected as a Fellow of the American Academy of Arts and Sciences in 2001. He was also president of the Southern Political Science Association for 1998-99 and of the Midwest Political Science Association for 2005.

He was elected a Member of the National Academy of Sciences in 2024.

== Select publications ==
- Before the Convention: Strategies and Choices in Presidential Nomination Campaigns. 1980. University of Chicago Press. ISBN 978-0-226-01270-4
- Analysis with a Limited Dependent Variable: Linear Probability, Logit, and Probit Models. 1984. Sage. (with Forrest Nelson).
- "Foreign Affairs and Issue Voting: Do Presidential Candidates "Waltz Before A Blind Audience?" 1989. American Political Science Review 83(1): 123–141. (with John Sullivan and Eugene Borgida).
- "Rational Choice and Turnout." 1993. American Journal of Political Science 37(1): 246–278.
- American Government: People, Institutions and Policies, 3rd ed. 1994. Houghton Mifflin. (with Paul Johnson and Gary Miller). ISBN 978-0-395-35195-6
- Why Parties? The Origin and Transformation of Political Parties in America. 1995. University of Chicago Press. ISBN 978-0-226-01272-8
- "The Transition to Republican Rule in the House: Implications for Theories of Congressional Politics." 1997. Political Science Quarterly 112(4): 541–567. (with David Rohde).
- Change and Continuity in the 2004 and 2006 Elections. 2007. CQ Press. (with Paul Abramson and David Rohde). ISBN 978-1-60871-798-9
- A Positive Change in Political Science: The Legacy of Richard D. McKelvey’s Most Influential Writings. 2007. University of Michigan Press. (edited with James Alt and Arthur Lupia).
- Why Parties? A Second Look. 2011. University of Chicago Press. ISBN 978-0-226-01274-2
- Why Parties Matter: Political Competition and Democracy in the American South. 2018. (with John D. Griffin).
