= Southern Political Science Association =

- Formation: 1929
- Type: learned society
- Tax ID no.: 46-3391318
- Legal status: 501(c)(3) public charity
- Website: spsa.net

The Southern Political Science Association (SPSA) is an American learned society and national political science association. It promotes political science in the United States and internationally. Its primary purposes are to publish a professional journal, to improve teaching, to promote interest and research in theoretical and practical political problems, to encourage communication and to develop standards of competence and respect between persons engaged in the professional study and practice of government and politics.

== History ==
The Southern Political Science Association was founded in 1929 in Atlanta, Georgia. It is independent of the American Political Science Association. Its first president was Cullen B. Gosnell, a professor of Political Science at Emory University.

The association organizes a conference every January. From 1929 to 1936, it took place in Atlanta, Georgia. However, since 1937, its location has changed to a different location in the South every year. From 1956 to 1963, the annual meeting took place in Gatlinburg, Tennessee, where both whites and blacks could find places to stay.

Its president was Alfred Benjamin Butts in 1938. Roscoe C. Martin served as its president in 1942. He was followed by Herman Clarence Nixon, who served as its president in 1944 and 1945. By 1955, its president was Manning J. Dauer.

During the McCarthy era of the 1950s, the association remained apolitical. In 1964, Martin Luther King Jr. gave an address at the SPSA meeting in Durham, North Carolina. By 1973, its president was Samuel DuBois Cook, an African-American political scientist.

The SPSA publishes The Journal of Politics, a peer-reviewed academic journal.

== Past presidents ==
- Cullen B. Gosnell (1929)
- Irby Hudson (1930)
- Robert Stanley Rankin (1931)
- George Sherrill (1932)
- Cullen B. Gosnell (1933)
- E.B. Wright (1934)
- John W. Manning (1935)
- David W. Knepper (1936)
- Frank W. Prescott (1937)
- A.B. Butts (1938)
- Kenner C. Frazer (1939)
- Robert R. Wilson (1940)
- D.F. Fleming (1941)
- Roscoe C. Martin (1942)
- H.C. Nixon (1944)
- James Hart (1946)
- Robert J. Harris (1947)
- Merritt B. Pound (1948)
- Lawrence L. Durisch (1949)
- Jasper B. Shannon (1950)
- Taylor Cole (1951)
- W.V. Holloway (1952)
- Charles B. Robson (1953)
- Walter H. Bennett (1954)
- Manning J. Dauer (1955)
- Carl B. Swisher (1956)
- Marian D. Irish (1957)
- Lee S. Greene (1958)
- Robert K. Gooch (1959)
- Rene De Visme Williamson (1960)
- Arthur Dugan (1961)
- Alexander Heard (1962)
- Amry Vandenbosch (1963)
- John H. Hallowell (1964)
- Fredric N. Cleaveland (1965)
- Avery Leiserson (1966)
- Preston W. Edsall (1967)
- Gladys Kammerer (1968)
- Wallace Mendelson (1969)
- Donald Strong (1970)
- James Prothro (1971)
- S. Sidney Ulmer (1972)
- Samuel DuBois Cook (1973)
- Alex N. Dragnich (1974)
- William Livingston (1975)
- Jewel Prestage (1976)
- Thomas Dye (1977)
- Robert Golembiewski (1978)
- William C. Harvard (1979)
- Chester Bain (1980)
- Macolm Jewell (1981)
- Deil Wright (1982)
- Clifton McCleskey (1983)
- Robert Huckshorn (1984)
- James E. Anderson (1985)
- Charles Bullock III (1986)
- M. Margaret Conway (1987)
- Donald Vaughan (1988)
- Allen Kornberg (1989)
- William Keech (1990)
- Bradley Canon (1991)
- Anne Hopkins (1992)
- Charles Hadley (1993)
- Susan Macmanus (1994)
- Michael Giles (1995)
- Marian Lief Palley (1996)
- Earl Black (1997)
- Ronald E. Weber (1998)
- John Aldrich (1999)
- Karen O’Connor (2000)
- Harold Stanley (2001)
- Mary Ellen Guy (2003)
- Merle Black (2004)
- James Garand (2005)
- Paula McClain (2006)
- Jon Bond (2007)
- Catherine Rudder (2008)
- Paul Herrnson (2009)
- C. Neal Tate (2010)
- Carol Weissert (2011)
- Kim Quaile Hill (2012)
- David Rohde (2013)
- Lawrence Dodd (2014)
- Thomas Carsey (2015)
- Ann Bowman (2016)
- William Jacoby (2017)
- Judith Baer (2018)
- David Lewis (2019)
- Jeff Gill (2020)
- Cherie Maestas (2021)
- Christopher Wlezien (2022)
- Marc Hetherington (2023)
- Susan Haire (2024)
