= Rudman =

Rudman is a surname, and may refer to:

- Brian Rudman (contemporary), New Zealand journalist
- David Rudman (born 1963), American muppeteer
- David Rudman (wrestler) (1943–2022), Soviet wrestling champion, Sambo world champion, and judo European champion
- Laurie A. Rudman (contemporary), American professor of social psychology
- Shelley Rudman (b. 1981), British Olympic skeleton rider
- Warren Rudman (1930–2012), American politician from New Hampshire; U.S. Senator 1980–93
- William B. Rudman (b. 1940s), malacologist
- Les Rudman Major General, South Africa
- Rudman (name origin)
