= Sharon Wright Austin =

American political scientist

- Education: Christian Brothers University; University of Memphis; University of Tennessee
- Scientific career
- Fields: Political science; African-American Studies
- Workplaces: University of Florida; University of Louisville; University of Michigan; University of Missouri; Yale University

Sharon Wright Austin (née Sharon D. Wright) is an American political scientist, currently a professor of political science at the University of Florida, where she was also a longtime Director of the African-American Studies Program. Austin is a prominent scholar of American politics with specialties in African-American studies, political participation, and both urban and rural local politics.

== Early career and education ==
Austin graduated from Westwood High School in Memphis, Tennessee, and then attended the Christian Brothers University, earning a bachelor's degree in history with a minor in political science in 1987. She then completed a master's degree in political science with a minor in education at the University of Memphis in 1989, followed in 1993 by a PhD in political science with a focus on American Government from the University of Tennessee. Although Austin was interested in African-American political participation and minority politics in the United States, she was sometimes discouraged from pursuing these topics early in her career because of the perception that they were not valued by the editors and reviewers at top political science journals.

== Career ==
Austin is a leading scholar of the political behavior of African-American women, the elections of African-Americans to local offices, and the political behavior of minority groups in American politics, particularly activism among African-Americans in rural areas.

After receiving her PhD from the University of Tennessee in 1993, Austin became a professor of Pan-African studies at the University of Louisville. In 1995 she moved to the University of Missouri, where she was a professor of Political Science and Black Studies. In 2001 she moved to the University of Michigan for one year, before becoming a professor at the University of Florida in 2001. From 2012 to 2019, Austin was the Director of the African-American Studies Program there. When Austin became Director in 2012, the University of Florida began offering a major in African-American Studies, and under her tenure the program grew to the point that the University of Florida had the most students majoring in African-American Studies of any program in the United States.

In 2000, Austin published her first book, Race, Power, and Political Emergence in Memphis. The book studied the features, successes, and limitations of African-American electoral politics in Memphis from the 1870s to the 1990s, in the context of unremitting white supremacy and powerful White electoral coalitions. The book was a continuation of the research that comprised her PhD dissertation at the University of Tennessee, Aftermath of the Voting Rights Act of 1965: Racial Voting Patterns in Memphis Mayoral Elections, 1967-1991.

Austin's second book, The Transformation of Plantation Politics in the Mississippi Delta: Black Politics, Concentrated Poverty, and Social Capital in the Mississippi Delta, was published in 2006. This book "persuasively demonstrates" that there "has been no transformation of politics in the Mississippi Delta" since the 1960s, and that by the 2000s "the area's wealthy white elite continues to dominate politics there". This finding is counterintuitive, because on the surface the rate of electoral success of African-Americans there appeared to skyrocket: there were 57 African-American elected officials in Mississippi in 1970, and 897 in 2000. The book arrived at this finding through a combination of historical and sociological methods, personal interviews, and statistical analysis on extensive data.

In 2018, Austin published her third book, The Caribbeanization of Black Politics: Race, Group Consciousness, and Political Participation in America. Austin tested the extent to which the political behaviour of Black immigrants would differ from or resemble the distinctive contemporary and historical features of African-American politics, since the phenomenon of Black immigrants arriving to the United States from several different countries simultaneously is relatively recent, and recent immigrants may not have been present for various formative events in African-American political history. To test this question, Austin chooses to focus on the cities Boston, Chicago, Miami, and New York City, and presents results from 2,359 survey or interview respondents who were African-Americans, Cape Verdeans, Haitians, or West Indians there, making this book "the largest comparative African-American urban survey." The book documents how the construction of a racial consciousness and the incorporation of immigrants into an existing political group identity can function as important mechanisms for engaging minority groups in political processes.

Austin is a member of the 2020-2024 editorial leadership of the American Political Science Review, which is the most selective political science journal. Austin has also regularly provided analysis in newspapers as an expert on contemporary American politics, and particularly African-American political participation.

== Books ==
- Race, Power, and Political Emergence in Memphis (Taylor & Francis, 2000)
- The Transformation of Plantation Politics in the Mississippi Delta: Black Politics, Concentrated Poverty, and Social Capital in the Mississippi Delta (SUNY Press, 2006)
- The Caribbeanization of Black Politics: Race, Group Consciousness, and Political Participation in America (SUNY Press, 2018)
- Political Black Girl Magic: The Elections and Governance of Black Female Mayors (Temple University Press, 2023)

== Selected awards ==
- University of Florida University-wide Advisor of the Year (2004-2005)
- Best Paper on Blacks and Politics Award, Western Political Science Association (2008)
- Erika Fairchild Award, Women's Caucus of the Southern Political Science Association (2009)
- Colonel Allen R. and Margaret G. Crow Term Professor of Liberal Arts and Sciences, University of Florida (2010-2011)
