= Catherine Rudder =

American political scientist

Catherine E. Rudder
- Education: Emory University; Ohio State University
- Awards: Emory Medal; Frank J. Goodnow Award; Erika Fairchild Award; Outstanding Professional Achievement Award, Midwest Women's Caucus
- Scientific career
- Fields: Political science
- Workplaces: University of Georgia; American Political Science Association; George Mason University

Catherine E. Rudder is an American political scientist. She is professor emerita in the School of Public Policy at George Mason University, where she has also been Associate Dean for Academic Affairs. As a scholar of public policy in the United States, she focuses on congressional reform and the making of American tax policy. Rudder has also been executive director of the American Political Science Association, and Chief of Staff to Representative Wyche Fowler.

== Life and career ==
Rudder graduated from Emory University with a B.A. degree in 1969. She then attended Ohio State University, where she obtained an M.A. in 1972 and a PhD in 1973.

In 1973, Rudder became a professor in the Department of Political Science at the University of Georgia. In 1977, she became a legislative assistant to Representative Wyche Fowler, and from 1978 to 1981 Rudder served as his chief of staff. From 1981 to 1983 she was the assistant director of the American Political Science Association, during which time she also edited PS: Political Science & Politics. In 1983 she became associate director of the Organization, and in 1987 she became executive director, remaining in this role until 2001. Rudder then moved to George Mason University, where she became a professor in the School of Public Policy. From 2004 to 2008, she was the Associate Dean for Academic Affairs in George Mason University's School of Public Policy. Rudder has also been a Public Policy Fellow at the Hoover Institution, a Robert Bosch Public Policy Fellow at the American Academy in Berlin, and a visiting scholar at George Washington University.

Rudder researches topics in American public policy. She has particularly focused on the study of Congressional reform and how United States tax policy is determined. She has also published reports and articles on smoking and tobacco regulation, and the committee system in the United States Congress.

In 1990, Rudder won the Emory Medal, which is the highest award given to outstanding alumni of Emory University. In 2001, Rudder was a recipient of the Frank J. Goodnow Award of the American Political Science Association, which recognizes "those who make exceptional contributions to the development of the political science profession". In 2002, Rudder received the Erika Fairchild Award from the Women's Caucus for Political Science, South, which is awarded for a combination of scholarship, teaching, service to the profession, and collegiality. In 2004, Rudder won the Outstanding Professional Achievement Award from the Midwest Women's Caucus for Political Science of the American Political Science Association.

== Selected works ==
- "Committee reform and the revenue process", in Congress Reconsidered edited by Lawrence C. Dodd and Bruce I. Oppenheimer (1977)
- "U.S.A. Tobacco Control: Six Lessons in Public Policy for Medical Science Professionals", World Medical and Health Policy, with A. Lee Fritschler (2006)
- Smoking and Politics: Bureaucracy-Centered Policy Making, 6th edition, with A. Lee Fritschler (2007)
- "Private governance as public policy: a paradigmatic shift", The Journal of Politics (2008)
- Public policymaking by private organizations: Challenges to democratic governance, with A. Lee Fritschler and Yon Jung Choi (2016)

== Selected awards ==
- Emory Medal (1990)
- Frank J. Goodnow Award, American Political Science Association (2001)
- Erika Fairchild Award, Women's Caucus for Political Science, South (2002)
- Outstanding Professional Achievement Award, APSA Midwest Women's Caucus for Political Science (2004)
