= Roscoe C. Martin =

American professor (1903–1972)

- Born: Roscoe Coleman Martin; November 18, 1903; Silsbee, Hardin County, Texas, U.S.
- Died: May 12, 1972 (aged 68); Syracuse, Onondaga County, New York, U.S.
- Education: University of Texas at Austin; University of Chicago
- Occupation: Political scientist

Roscoe Coleman Martin (1903 – 1972) was an American political scientist. He was Professor of Political Science at the University of Texas at Austin in the 1930s. From 1938 to 1949, he was Professor of Political Science and Director of the Bureau of Public Administration at the University of Alabama (UA), where he strengthened the links between UA and the Tennessee Valley Authority (TVA). Finally, he was Professor at Syracuse University in New York from 1949 onwards. He was a pioneer in the academic discipline of Public Administration.

== Early life ==
Roscoe Coleman Martin was born on November 18, 1903, in Silsbee, Texas. His father was a public school teacher and superintendent.

Martin graduated from the University of Texas at Austin, where he received a bachelor's degree in 1924 and a master's degree in 1925. His MA thesis was entitled, "The Farmers in Texas Politics, 1875-1900". He received a PhD in Political Science from the University of Chicago in 1932. His PhD dissertation was entitled, "The People's Party in Texas: A Study in Third Party Politics".

== Academic career ==
Martin started his academic career at his alma mater, the University of Texas at Austin, as an Instructor in Government in 1926. By the 1930s, he became full professor.

Martin became the Chair of the Department of Political Science at the University of Alabama (UA) in 1938. He founded the Bureau of Public Administration at UA and served as its director. His 1945 book entitled New Horizons in Public Administration was the first book published by the University of Alabama Press. The following year, in 1946, Martin secured a grant from the Rockefeller Foundation and persuaded V. O. Key, Jr. to write, Southern Politics in State and Nation with the help of G. Alexander Heard and Donald S. Strong; the book was published in 1949 and it became a classic of American political science. Additionally, Martin strengthened links between UA and the Tennessee Valley Authority, and edited TVA: The First Twenty Years, published by the University of Alabama Press in 1956.

Meanwhile, Martin served as the President of the Southern Political Science Association in 1942. He also served as the first book review editor of its academic journal, The Journal of Politics. In 1944, he was a co-founder of the Southern Regional Training Program in Public Administration, a program between the University of Alabama, the University of Tennessee and the University of Kentucky to train students towards earning a master's degree in Public Administration.

In 1949, Martin became Professor of Political Science at Syracuse University. From 1949 to 1950, he served as the president of the American Society for Public Administration. Martin was a pioneer in the academic discipline of Public Administration.

== Death ==
Martin died on May 12, 1972, in Syracuse, New York.
