= Enemies of the State =

- Theatrical release poster
- Directed by: Sonia Kennebeck
- Produced by: Ines Hoffman Kanna; Sonia Kennebeck
- Cinematography: Torsten Lapp
- Edited by: Maxine Goedicke
- Music by: Insa Rudolph
- Production companies: Codebreaker Films; Reva & David Logan Foundation; International Documentary Association; Chicken & Egg Pictures; JustFilms/Ford Foundation
- Distributed by: IFC Films
- Release dates: September 11, 2020 (TIFF); July 30, 2021 (United States)
- Running time: 103 minutes
- Country: United States
- Language: English
- Box office: $8,495

Enemies of the State is a 2020 American documentary film directed and produced by Sonia Kennebeck. It follows Matt DeHart, a former intelligence analyst and convicted sex offender, who claims that the FBI invented child pornography allegations against him in retaliation for possessing confidential documents alleging misconduct by the CIA. Errol Morris serves as an executive producer.

The film had its world premiere at the Toronto International Film Festival on September 11, 2020. It was released on July 30, 2021, by IFC Films.

== Synopsis ==
Matt DeHart and his family claim that after he discovered documents showing misconduct by the CIA, he was the victim of an attempted cover-up by the United States government. He alleges that he was tortured by the FBI and framed for the possession of child pornography. His claims remain unverified and ultimately he pleaded guilty to sex crimes against minors in federal court in Tennessee.

== Release ==
The film had its world premiere at the Toronto International Film Festival on September 11, 2020. The film was initially set to have its world premiere at the Tribeca Film Festival in April 2020, but the festival was cancelled due to the COVID-19 pandemic. In March 2021, IFC Films acquired U.S. distribution rights to the film, and set it for a July 31, 2021, release.

== Reception ==
Enemies of the State holds a 78% approval rating on review aggregator website Rotten Tomatoes, based on 40 reviews, with an average of 6.4/10. The website's critics consensus reads: "Its narrative twists and turns hinder the effectiveness of its message, but Enemies of the State is a fascinating and timely look at the erosion of trust and truth." On Metacritic, the film holds a rating of 74 out of 100, based on 13 critics, indicating "generally favorable" reviews.
