= Judge Nixon =

Judge Nixon may refer to:

- John T. Nixon (1820–1889), judge of the United States District Court for the District of New Jersey
- John Trice Nixon (1933–2019), judge of the United States District Court for the Middle District of Tennessee
- Walter Nixon (born 1928), judge of the United States District Court for the Southern District of Mississippi

== See also ==
- Judge Aimee Nixon, fictional corrupt undercover judge on the list of Judge Dredd characters
