= DeHart =

DeHart, De Hart, or DeHeart is a surname and occasionally a given name. Notable people with the name include:

== Given name ==
- DeHart H. Ames (1872–1955), American businessman and politician from New York
- DeHart Hubbard (1903–1976), American track-and-field athlete, first African American to win an individual Olympic gold medal

== Surname ==
=== DeHart ===
- Jarret DeHart (born 1994), American baseball coach
- Jimmy DeHart (1893–1935), American college football player and coach
- Matt DeHart (born 1984), United States Air National Guard intelligence analyst and registered sex offender
- Rick DeHart (born 1970), American former baseball pitcher
- Roger DeHart, a biology teacher at Burlington-Edison High School who controversially taught the intelligent design theory
- Ryler DeHeart (born 1984), American professional pickleball player and former tennis player
- Tony DeHart (born 1990), American ice hockey player
- Wayne Dehart, American actor

=== De Hart ===
- Jane Sherron De Hart (born 1936), American feminist historian and women's studies academic
- John De Hart (1727–1795), American lawyer, jurist and politician

== See also ==
- Evelyn Hu-DeHart (born 1947), Chinese-American academic historian
