= Policy Design for Democracy =

Book by Anne Schneider and Helen Ingram

- Author: Anne Schneider; Helen Ingram
- Language: English
- Publisher: University Press of Kansas
- Publication date: 1997
- Publication place: United States
- ISBN: 0700608443
- OCLC: 36942523

Policy Design for Democracy is a 1997 book by political scientists Anne Schneider and Helen Ingram that describes the process of public policy formation in democratic states, with particular emphasis on the United States.

== Background ==
The American political scientists Anne Schneider and Helen Ingram began working together on a general concept of policy design in the 1980s based on the theory of social construction. An early version of their theory was published in an article entitled "Social Construction of Target Populations" in the American Political Science Review in June 1993. Policy Design for Democracy was the codified realization of their fifteen years of research and work and was "one of the first books to examine systematically the substantive aspects of public policy." The book was published in 1997 by the University Press of Kansas.

== Content ==
Example target groups described by Ingram and Schneider in "Policy Design for Democracy" as they existed in the late 1990s in the United States

Schneider and Ingram argue that policy makers segment societies into target groups that are either rewarded or punished based on their position on a four-quadrant grid which divides society into the "Advantaged" (composed of groups which are politically influential and are generally perceived in a positive light), the "Dependents" (groups which are politically weak but are generally perceived in a positive light), the "Contenders" (groups which are politically powerful and are generally perceived in a negative light), and the "Deviants" (groups which are politically weak and are generally perceived in a negative light.

In general, politicians will seek to craft public policies that benefit the "Advantaged" and which sanction and punish "Deviants" as a means of ensuring their future electoral success. "Contenders" and "Dependents", meanwhile, are often ignored by policy makers; attempts to punish "Contenders" can be blunted by their relative political influence and attempts to punish "Dependents" negated by the positive public perception they enjoy in society. On the other hand, policymaking that benefits "Contenders" is difficult due to their negative public perception while that which benefits "Dependents" is not useful for politicians as that group lacks political influence with which to "repay" such policies by voting and campaign contributions. This process is called "degenerative policy design" by the authors and is posited by them as a central and enduring feature of the American political system.

== Reception ==
Policy Design for Democracy received the 2008 Aaron Wildavsky Award for Enduring Contributions from the Public Policy Section of the American Political Science Association.
