= Reality Winner =

American intelligence translator (born 1991)

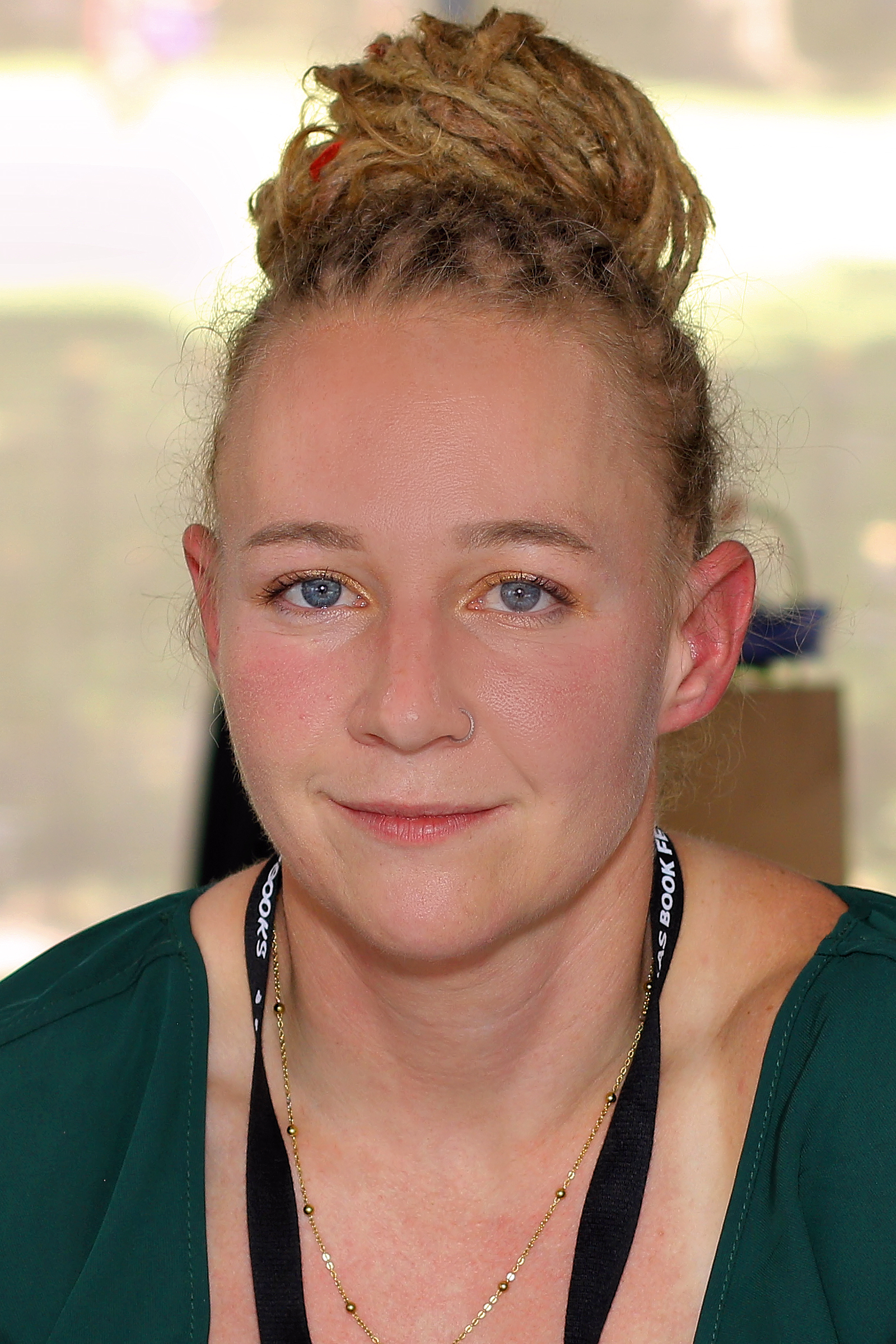
- Winner at the 2025 Texas Book Festival
- Born: Reality Leigh Winner; December 4, 1991 (age 34); Alice, Texas, U.S.
- Occupation: National Security Agency (NSA) translator
- Employer: Pluribus International Corporation
- Known for: Revealed classified NSA document about Russian interference in the 2016 United States elections
- Criminal information
- Status: Released
- Conviction: Pleaded guilty to felony transmission of national defense information
- Criminal charges: 18 U.S. Code § 793(e) – Gathering, transmitting or losing national defense information
- Penalty: Five years and three months in prison

Details
- Imprisoned at: Federal Medical Center, Carswell
- Military career
- Branch: United States Air Force
- Service years: 2010–2016
- Rank: Senior airman (E-4)
- Unit: 94th Intelligence Squadron
- Awards: Air Force Commendation Medal

Reality Leigh Winner (born December 4, 1991) is a United States Air Force veteran, and a former National Security Agency (NSA) translator. In 2018, she was given the longest prison sentence ever imposed for an unauthorized release of government classified information to the media, after she leaked an intelligence report about Russian interference in the 2016 United States elections. She was sentenced to five years and three months in federal prison.

On June 3, 2017, while employed by the military contractor Pluribus International Corporation (de), Winner was arrested on suspicion of leaking an intelligence report about Russian interference in the 2016 United States elections from the NSA to the news website The Intercept. The report indicated that Russian hackers accessed voter registration records in the United States with an email phishing operation.

The Intercept's mishandling of the material exposed her as the source and led to her arrest. Twice denied bail, Winner was held at the Lincoln County Jail in Lincolnton, Georgia. On August 23, 2018, Winner was convicted of espionage for "removing classified material from a government facility and mailing it to a news outlet" and sentenced to five years and three months in prison as part of a plea deal.

Reality Winner was incarcerated at the Federal Medical Center, Carswell in Fort Worth, Texas. On June 2, 2021, Winner was released to the San Antonio, Texas-based Residential Reentry Management center. In November 2021, she was released from federal custody.

== Early life ==
Winner was born in Texas to Billie and Ronald Winner. Her father chose her unusual name. She grew up in Kingsville, Texas, and attended H. M. King High School, where she learned Latin at school, studied Arabic in her free time, and played on the soccer and tennis teams.

Her father's influence early in her life had extensively shaped Winner's worldview on many topics, including politics, history, philosophy, and religion. After the September 11 attacks, Winner had intense discussions with her father on geopolitics and Islam, and she decided to learn the Arabic language.

== Career ==
Winner served in the United States Air Force from 2010 to 2016, achieving the rank of senior airman (an E-4 paygrade) with the 94th Intelligence Squadron. After two years of language and intelligence training, she was posted to Fort Meade, Maryland. She worked as a linguist who spoke the Persian language as well as Dari and Pashto, the two official languages of Afghanistan. Assigned to the drone program, she listened in on intercepted foreign chatter to provide U.S. forces with intelligence. Winner was awarded the Air Force Commendation Medal for "aiding in 650 enemy captures, 600 enemies killed in action and identifying 900 high value targets."

A month after being honorably discharged from the Air Force in November 2016, Winner moved to Augusta, Georgia, where she taught at a CrossFit gym and a yoga studio. Winner applied for jobs with NGOs in Afghanistan, hoping to use her Pashto language skills with refugees. However, her search for overseas employment was frustrated by her lack of post-secondary education. Still possessing a top-secret security clearance, Winner was then hired by Pluribus International Corporation, a small firm that provides services under contract to the National Security Agency. On February 13, 2017, Pluribus assigned her to work at Fort Gordon, a U.S. Army post near Augusta, where she had once been stationed while in the Air Force.

== Release of classified document ==
"Russia military intelligence executed a cyberattack on at least one U.S. voting software supplier and sent spear-phishing emails to more than 100 local election officials just days before last November’s presidential election, according to a highly classified intelligence report ... dated May 5, 2017, the most detailed U.S. government account of Russian interference in the election that has yet come to light." —The Intercept, June 5, 2017.

Assigned to translate foreign documents relating to Iran's aerospace program in Persian, Winner was employed by Pluribus International Corporation at the time of her arrest. Winner came across a single classified document which she subsequently anonymously mailed to The Intercept. Winner told CBS's 60 Minutes that she leaked the classified material because she thought Americans were being intentionally misled about Russia's active measures to influence the outcome of the 2016 United States presidential election.

=== Arrest ===
When FBI agents arrived at her home on June 3, 2017, Winner did not insist on consulting a lawyer, and the FBI agents failed to inform her of her Miranda rights when Winner was arrested. When her house was searched and she was initially questioned, Winner stated that she was not "trying to be a Snowden or anything".

The Department of Justice announced her arrest on June 5. She was detained even before The Intercept published the article that was based upon the leaks. The Intercept report described Russian military attempts to interfere with the 2016 presidential election by hacking a U.S. voting software supplier and by sending spear-phishing emails to more than 100 local election officials just days before the November 8 election. The story was based upon a top secret May 5, 2017, National Security Agency (NSA) document leaked to them anonymously.

Julian Assange, the founder of WikiLeaks, called on the public to support Winner, offering a $10,000 reward for information about a reporter for The Intercept who had allegedly helped the U.S. government identify Winner as the leaker. Assange wrote on Twitter that "Winner is no Clapper or Petraeus with 'elite immunity'. She's a young woman against the wall for talking to the press."

=== Role of The Intercept ===
The Intercept sent copies of the documents to the NSA on May 30 to confirm their veracity, and the NSA notified the FBI. According to Vice magazine, an FBI report said the documents "appeared to be folded and/or creased, suggesting they had been printed and hand-carried out of a secured space." Through an internal audit, the NSA determined that Winner was one of six workers who had accessed the particular documents on its classified system, but only Winner's computer had been in contact with The Intercept using a personal email account. On June 3, the FBI obtained a warrant to search Winner's electronic devices, and she was subsequently arrested.

Both journalists and security experts have suggested that The Intercept's handling of the documents, which included publishing the documents unredacted and including the printer tracking dots, was used to identify Winner as the leaker. In October 2020, The Intercept's co-founding editor Glenn Greenwald wrote that Winner had sent her documents to The Intercept's New York newsroom with no request that any specific journalist work on them. He called her exposure a "deeply embarrassing newsroom failure" resulting from "speed and recklessness," for which he was publicly blamed "despite having no role in it." He said editor-in-chief Betsy Reed "oversaw, edited, and controlled that story." An internal review conducted by The Intercept into its handling of the document provided by Winner found that its "practices fell short of the standards to which we hold ourselves".

CIA whistleblower John Kiriakou and Guantanamo Bay detention camp whistleblower Joseph Hickman have also both accused Matthew Cole—the same reporter accused of revealing Winner's identity—of playing a role in their exposure, which, in Kiriakou's case, led to imprisonment.

=== Prosecution ===
Winner was charged with "removing classified material from a government facility and mailing it to a news outlet." On June 8, 2017, she pleaded not guilty to a charge of "willful retention and transmission of national defense information" and was denied bail. Prosecutors alleged she may have been involved in other leaks of classified information, and might try to flee the country if released. Justice Department lawyers also argued that her defense team should not be allowed to discuss any classified information, even if it was in news reports published by the media.

The U.S. magistrate judge who presided over Winner's bail hearing, Brian Epps, said, "She seems to have a fascination with the Middle East and Islamic terrorism," and quoted her writing: "It's a Christlike vision to have a fundamentalist Islamic state." Federal agents had found her diary during a search of her home, in which she allegedly expressed support for Taliban leaders and Osama bin Laden, and for burning down the White House. However, one of the prosecutors at her bail hearing said, "The government is not in any way suggesting the defendant has become a jihadist or that she is a Taliban sympathizer."

On August 29, 2017, Winner's attorneys filed a motion in district court to suppress her statements to law enforcement, arguing that Winner was not read her Miranda rights before being interrogated by the FBI on June 3. On October 5, 2017, Epps denied a second request from her defense attorneys that bail be set. In December 2017, The Intercept reported that Winner's defense team was allowed to discuss the case with her, including its classified aspects, in a Sensitive Compartmented Information Facility (SCIF). First Look, the parent company of The Intercept, helped fund her defense, and as of September 2020 was still paying her legal bills.

On January 31, 2018, the U.S. Court of Appeals for the Eleventh Circuit affirmed a lower court order blocking Winner from posting bond, determining that no combination of conditions would reasonably assure her presence at trial, thus ensuring that she remained in jail until her trial, which was scheduled to begin on October 15, 2018.

A "Stand with Reality" campaign was formed by representatives from Courage to Resist, the Electronic Frontier Foundation, and the Freedom of the Press Foundation with the goal of "raising public awareness" to ensure that Reality Winner received a fair trial. Billie Winner-Davis, mother of Reality Winner, called on members of the public to join the campaign.

On June 21, 2018, Winner asked the court to allow her to change her plea to guilty. On June 26, she pled guilty to one count of felony transmission of national defense information. Winner's plea agreement with prosecutors called for her to serve five years and three months in prison followed by three years of supervised release. No one has ever received a longer sentence for leaking classified information to a media outlet.

=== Sentencing and confinement ===
On August 23, 2018, Winner was sentenced to the agreed-upon five years and three months in prison for violating the Espionage Act of 1917. Prosecutors said her sentence, 63 months in prison, was the longest ever imposed in federal court for an unauthorized release of government information to the media. At her sentencing, Winner told the judge, "My actions were a cruel betrayal of my nation's trust in me." The New York Times reported, "Under the plea agreement, Ms. Winner will be transferred to the Federal Bureau of Prisons Federal Medical Center, Carswell in Fort Worth, Texas, where she can receive treatment for bulimia and be relatively close to her family."

On August 24, 2018, President Donald Trump tweeted, "Ex-NSA contractor to spend 63 months in jail over 'classified' information. Gee, this is 'small potatoes' compared to what Hillary Clinton did! So unfair Jeff, Double Standard." Winner expressed appreciation for Trump's support, saying, "I can't thank him enough." Titus Nichols, Winner's lawyer, called the tweet "bizarre" and that it was just Trump "taking aim at Jeff (Attorney General Jeff Sessions)". On August 31, Winner said that she would ask Trump for clemency as a result of his tweet, adding that her legal team was already working on her pardon application.

On April 24, 2020, a federal judge rejected Winner's request to commute the remaining 19 months of her 63-month sentence and be released to home confinement due to the COVID-19 pandemic. Winner's lawyer argued that her history of respiratory illness and immune system compromised by bulimia makes her highly vulnerable to the virus. Two inmates had tested positive before Winner was transferred to the federal medical center where, under the terms of her June 2018 guilty plea agreement, Winner was housed to meet her special needs. She was immediately quarantined and never entered the general population there. The government insisted that the Bureau of Prisons (BOP) "has taken aggressive action to mitigate the danger and is taking careful steps to protect inmates' and BOP staff members' health." The judge found that Winner did not exhaust her administrative remedies through the BOP, which he held has sole authority to grant her compassionate release. Winner tested positive for COVID-19 in July 2020. By September 13, 2020, Winner was recovering from the coronavirus, although still experiencing occasional shortness of breath.

=== Release from prison ===
On June 2, 2021, Winner was transferred from prison to a transitional facility, the San Antonio, Texas, Residential Reentry Management center. Since her release, she has published a memoir titled I Am Not Your Enemy. Winner's story is covered in the 2021 documentary Reality Winner. Winner was portrayed by Sydney Sweeney in the film Reality and Emilia Jones in Winner. Winner's experience has also been adapted into a play, Is This A Room.

== See also ==
- Reality Winner - 2021 documentary about Winner
- Reality - 2023 film about Winner
- Winner - 2024 film about Winner
- Thomas A. Drake – Former NSA senior executive, military veteran, and whistleblower (born 1957)
- Daniel Ellsberg – American political activist (1931–2023)
- Henry Kyle Frese – American counterterrorist analyst (born 1988)
- Katharine Gun – British linguist, translator and whistleblower (born 1974)
- Daniel Hale – Former US National Security Agency analyst (born 1987)
- Timeline of investigations into Donald Trump and Russia (January–June 2017)
- Timeline of Russian interference in the 2016 United States elections
