= Courage to Resist =

American anti-war organization (e. 2003)

The logo for the organization Courage to Resist

Courage to Resist (CTR) was an organization in the San Francisco, CA area and beyond formed during the early part of the Iraq War (often called the 2nd Iraq war) which began in 2003. CTR's mission was to support U.S. military war resisters, including helping them with legal fees such as well-known resisters Chelsea Manning and Reality Winner. In 2018, CTR began encouraging soldiers to resist at detention camps and other immigrant operations of the U.S. military. CTR's principle slogans are “Supporting the troops who refuse to fight!” and "Towards a World Without War!" They support those “who face consequences for acting on conscience, in opposition to illegal wars, occupations, [and] the policies of empire”.

On December 18, 2024, Jeff Paterson, Courage to Resist co-founder and longtime Director announced termination of Courage to Resist.

== Founding ==
The Iraq War began amid controversy of Iraq's possessing “weapons of mass destruction”. According to French academic Dominique Reynié, between 3 January and 12 April 2003, 36 million people globally took part in almost 3,000 protests against war in Iraq, with demonstrations on 15 February 2003 being the largest. Resistance also occurred in the U.S. military. On April 1, 2003, Stephen E. Funk, a U.S. Marine Corps Lance Corporal Reservist held a press conference outside the Camp Pendleton Marine Base in Oceanside, CA publicly announcing his refusal to participate in the war. Like minded civilians and veterans of earlier wars stepped forward to support Funk. As other soldiers refused orders and faced courts-martial, a broader support organization was needed for their defense. Courage to Resist was formed to help fill that need.

== Jeff Paterson ==
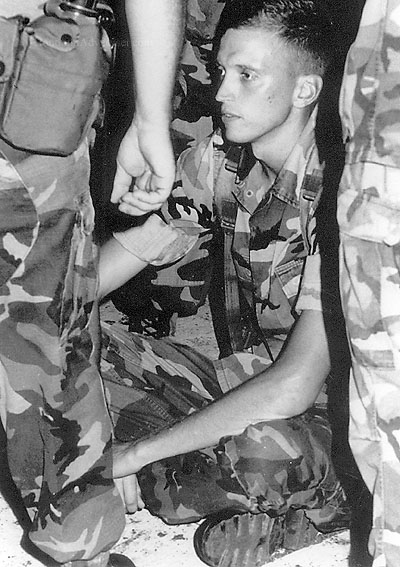
Marine Corporal Jeff Paterson refused to board military aircraft in Hawaii en route to Persian Gulf on August 7, 1990.

One of Funk's early supporters was Jeff Paterson, a former Marine who was the first soldier to publicly refuse orders to the 1st Iraq War in 1990. Paterson had been a Marine for five years and was on the verge of returning to civilian life when his discharge was cancelled in lieu of orders for deployment to the Persian Gulf. On August 7, 1990, as his unit boarded an aircraft in Hawaii, he sat down on the tarmac and refused to move. A week later he held a press conference where he stated, “I will not be a pawn in America’s power plays for profit and oil in the Middle East”. Paterson was a CTR founding member and has served for many years as the Project Director.

== Opposition to the Iraq War ==
CTR supported several early and later public resisters to the Iraq War, including Army Staff Sergeants Camilo Mejia and Kevin Benderman, Navy Petty Officer Pablo Paredes, Army medic Agustin Aguayo, Private First Class Robin Long, and Army First Lieutenant Ehren Watada. CTR support was in the form of funding public support and legal defense, staging rallies near military bases where resisters were being court martialed and at military recruiting stations, and participated in national days of actions to oppose the Iraq War and support resisters.

== Opposition to the War in Afghanistan ==
CTR supported the earliest public resisters to the War in Afghanistan (2001–present) including Victor Agosto and Travis Bishop.

== Israeli War Resisters Support ==
CTR members traveled to Israel and Palestine to meet with former Israeli soldiers about their experiences “carrying out acts of brutality and occupation” and decided to support resistance to the Israeli military. In 2008 they were instrumental in issuing a statement signed by 26 U.S. military soldiers and veterans who refused to fight in Iraq and Afghanistan, which supported Israeli Shministim (Hebrew for “12th graders”) who were also resisting military service. In 2018 they supported Tamar Ze’evi, a 15-year-old who spent 115 days in jail for refusing to enlist in the Israeli army.

== Chelsea Manning Support ==
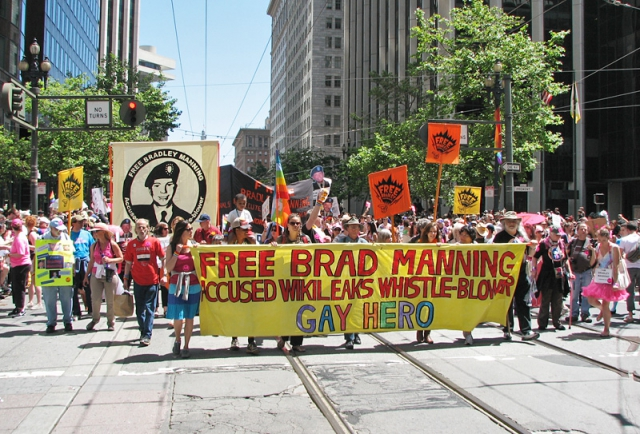
Activists March for Bradley Manning at the 2011 San Francisco Pride Parade.

In April 2010 a video showing a U.S. helicopter attack in Baghdad that killed eleven unarmed Iraqi civilians, including two Reuters employees, and seriously wounded two children was released by WikiLeaks and quickly spread via the Internet and news media. On May 27, 2010, Chelsea Manning was arrested and charged with espionage and “aiding the enemy”. Within days of Manning's arrest, CTR joined with others to defend her and help raise money for her defense. On August 21, 2013, she was sentenced 35 years in prison, reduction in rank to private, forfeiture of all pay and allowances, and a dishonorable discharge. This was the longest sentence ever given to a whistleblower and was widely criticized. Throughout the trial and the 7 years Manning served in Leavenworth prison, CTR defended her and provided financial support through the Chelsea Manning Support Network. Manning's lead defense attorney, David Coombs, credited CTR directly for her early release: “If not for the efforts of Jeff Paterson and the Manning Support Network and Courage to Resist, there’s no way that a president would spend the political capital to grant a commutation”. Manning said on the NBC Today show that she "would especially like to thank Courage to Resist and the Bradley Manning Support Network for their tireless efforts in raising awareness for my case and providing for my legal representation."

== Counter-Recruiting ==
CTR focuses some of its efforts to counter U.S. military recruiting, including the efforts of the military to influence and recruit youth. CTR organized a demonstration and vigils outside military recruiting centers, and on one occasion, forced a Marine recruiting center to close for several hours. They use materials such as those produced by the Stop Recruiting Kids campaign.

== Reality Winner Support ==
Reality Winner, a former U.S. Air Force intelligence specialist and military contractor, was arrested on June 3, 2017, and charged under the Espionage Act with leaking a National Security Agency report about Russian interference in the 2016 United States elections to the news website The Intercept. After her arrest, CTR began a campaign demanding the charges against her be dropped. CTR coordinated the formation of the Stand With Reality support committee that noted “the charge against Winner is grossly disproportionate to her alleged offense, and is designed to create a chilling effect on investigative journalism by dissuading sources from sharing information that is critical to the public interest.” On August 23, 2018, Winner received a sentence of 5 Years in prison. Since her conviction, CTR has joined with others to call for Winner's pardon or the commuting of her sentence to time served.

== Immigrants ==
CTR's most recent campaign opposes the use of U.S. military personnel in immigrant detention camps and on U.S. borders. CTR produced materials encouraging soldiers to resist the “illegal” orders in relation to immigration and they support GIs who have publicly resisted. For example, they support U.S. Army Captain Brittany DeBarros's uses social media and public statements to voice her opposition to the military's immigrant related deployments. She stated, “I didn’t take an oath to defend illegal war abroad and immigrant concentration camps at home. True leaders refuse illegal and immoral orders.”

== Termination ==
On December 18, 2024, Jeff Paterson, Courage to Resist co-founder and longtime Director announced on the Courage to Resist website:

"After 20 years of organizing to 'Support the troops who refuse to fight!,' the Courage to Resist Organizing Collective is formally coming to an end. We hope that our supporters will continue to support military war resisters by contributing to these critically important organizations, as we will continue to do individually:

   Military Law Task Force of the National Lawyers Guild 
   GI Rights Hotline 
   About Face: Veterans Against The War (formerly IVAW) 
   Center on Conscience and War

"Organizationally, we no longer have the energy or resources to seriously carry out our mission and do not want to divert resources from others who will continue this work. Over the last few months, Courage to Resist has granted the majority of our limited reserve funds to the organizations listed above. We expect to keep our website online indefinitely for archival reference."

== See also ==
- Iraq Veterans Against the War
- Concerned Officers Movement
- GI's Against Fascism
- GI Coffeehouses
- Movement for a Democratic Military
- Opposition to United States involvement in the Vietnam War
- Presidio mutiny
- Sir! No Sir!, a documentary about the anti-war movement within the ranks of the United States Armed Forces
- Vietnam Veterans Against the War
- List of anti-war organizations
- List of peace activists
- War Resisters League
- Central Committee for Conscientious Objectors
