= Herman Clarence Nixon =

American political scientist

- Born: 1886; Possum Trot, Calhoun County, Alabama, U.S.
- Died: 1967 (aged 80–81)
- Education: Auburn University
- Occupation: Academic
- Children: John Trice Nixon
- Relatives: Mignon Nixon (granddaughter)

Herman Clarence Nixon (1886 – 1967) was an American political scientist and a member of the Southern Agrarians.

== Early life ==
Herman Clarence Nixon was born in 1886 in Possum Trot, Alabama. He was educated in the public schools of Jacksonville, Alabama and attended the Jacksonville State normal school, graduating in 1907. He graduated from Alabama Polytechnic Institute, now known as Auburn University. He went to graduate school at University of Chicago. During World War I, he served in the United States Army in Europe.

== Career ==
Nixon taught Political Science at Vanderbilt University from 1925 to 1928. During that time, he joined the Southern Agrarians and contributed an essay to I'll Take My Stand: The South and the Agrarian Tradition. From 1928 to 1938, he taught at Tulane University. He then taught at Vanderbilt University again, from 1938 to 1955.

Nixon served as the President of the Southern Political Science Association in 1944 and 1945, though there was no meeting in 1945. Additionally, he was a member of the Southern Regional Committee of the Social Science Research Council.

Nixon served as the Chairman of the Southern Policy Committee from 1935 to 1937. He lobbied in favor of the Bankhead–Jones Farm Tenant Act of 1937. By 1938, he became the Executive Secretary of the Southern Conference for Human Welfare. Even though he quit by 1939, he felt threatened by the House Un-American Activities Committee. Nevertheless, he joined the Americans for Democratic Action in 1947.

== Personal life ==
Nixon had a son, John Trice Nixon, who served as a United States federal judge. His daughter-in-law, Betty C. Nixon, served on the Nashville city council from 1975 to 1987 and later worked for Vanderbilt University. His granddaughter, Mignon Nixon, is a professor at the Courtauld Institute of Art in London.

== Death ==
He died in 1967.

== Works ==
- Forty Acres and Steel Mules (1938).
- Possum Trot: Rural Community, South (1941).
- Lower Piedmont Country (1946).
