= Possum Trot, Alabama =

- Unincorporated community
- Location within Alabama Location within the United States
- Coordinates: 33°52′15″N 85°45′07″W
- Country: United States
- State: Alabama
- County: Calhoun
- Elevation: 640 ft (200 m)
- Time zone: UTC-6 (Central (CST))
  - Summer (DST): UTC-5 (CDT)
- Area codes: 256 & 938
- GNIS feature ID: 149212

Possum Trot is an unincorporated community in Calhoun County, Alabama, United States.

== Notable people ==
- Rick Bragg, a journalist, was raised in Possum Trot.
- Herman Clarence Nixon, a political scientist at Vanderbilt University and a member of the Southern Agrarians, was born in Possum Trot. In 1941, he wrote a book about his hometown, entitled Possum Trot: Rural Community, South.
- Lilly Ledbetter, American activist and namesake of the Lilly Ledbetter Fair Pay Act of 2009 was born in Possum Trot
