= Aleta Arthur Trauger =

American judge (born 1945)

Aleta Mae Grillos Arthur Trauger

Judge of the United States District Court for the Middle District of Tennessee
- Incumbent
- Assumed office October 22, 1998
- Appointed by: Bill Clinton
- Preceded by: John Trice Nixon

Personal details
- Born: Aleta Mae Grillos; 1945 (age 80–81) Denver, Colorado, U.S.
- Spouse: Byron R. Trauger
- Children: 1
- Education: Cornell College (BA); Vanderbilt University (MAT, JD)

Aleta Mae Grillos Arthur Trauger (born 1945) is a United States district judge of the United States District Court for the Middle District of Tennessee.

== Education and career ==
Trauger was born in Denver, Colorado. She received a Bachelor of Arts degree in English from Cornell College in 1968, a Master of Arts in Teaching from Vanderbilt University in 1972, and a Juris Doctor from Vanderbilt University Law School in 1976.

She was a law clerk and associate in private practice at Barrett Brandt & Barrett in Tennessee from 1974 to 1977. She began working there while a first-year law student. In late 1977, U.S. Attorney Hal Hardin hired her as a federal prosecutor; she served as an Assistant United States Attorney in the Middle District of Tennessee from 1977 to 1979 and from 1980 to 1982, serving in the Northern District of Illinois from 1979 to 1980.

In 1981, alongside Bob Lynch Jr, she prosecuted former Tennessee Governor Leonard Ray Blanton for extortion, conspiracy, and mail fraud relating to Blanton's sale of liquor licenses to his friends. Trauger has credited this case with establishing her reputation and credibility in a male-dominated profession.

She was in private practice from 1983 to 1984, and again from 1984 to 1985, returning to private practice from 1985 to 1991. In 1983, Trauger worked as in-house legal counsel for the College of Charleston, the first person to hold the position.

She was one of the founding members of the Tennessee Lawyers' Association for Women, established July 7, 1989.

Trauger served as Nashville Mayor Phil Bredesen's first chief of staff in 1991, leaving the position when she and husband Byron Trauger adopted a baby.

=== Federal judicial service ===
From 1993 to 1998, she was a United States bankruptcy judge for the Middle District of Tennessee.

On September 22, 1998, President Bill Clinton nominated Trauger to a seat on the United States District Court for the Middle District of Tennessee vacated by Judge John Trice Nixon. She was confirmed by the United States Senate on October 21, 1998, and received her commission on October 22, 1998. This made her the first female U.S. District Judge in the Middle District of Tennessee.

== Notable cases ==
On March 22, 2000, Trauger heard her first case from the District bench involving the death penalty. In the case of State of Tennessee v. Robert Glen Coe, Trauger issued a stay a mere 16 hours prior to his scheduled execution. Coe's attorneys had claimed he was not mentally competent, but did not prove that to Trauger's satisfaction, so she lifted the stay. The Tennessee Supreme Court then issued a decree setting Coe's execution date for April 5, 2000; Tennessee had not executed an inmate since 1960 when the case came before Trauger.

On March 14, 2014, in the case Tanco, et al. v. Haslam, et al., Trauger issued a preliminary injunction ordering Tennessee to recognize the marriages of three same-sex couples consummated out-of-state. In her ruling, Trauger did not directly hold Tennessee's ban unconstitutional, but stated that, "At some point in the future, likely with the benefit of additional precedent from circuit courts and, perhaps, the Supreme Court, the court will be asked to make a final ruling on the plaintiffs’ claims. At this point, all signs indicate that, in the eyes of the United States Constitution, the plaintiffs’ marriages will be placed on an equal footing with those of heterosexual couples and that proscriptions against same-sex marriage will soon become a footnote in the annals of American history."

On February 22, 2016, in United States of America v. Matt DeHart, Trauger sentenced Matt DeHart — an American citizen and former U.S. Air National Guard intelligence analyst known for his involvement with the Anonymous hacker group and WikiLeaks, as well as claims to have received classified documents alleging serious misconduct by the CIA — to 72 months for the porn charges and an additional 18 months for fleeing the country. Journalist Sarah Harrison called the sentencing, “another shameful milestone in the U.S. government's war on digital activists.”

On March 23, 2017, Trauger issued a preliminary injunction in the case of Doe v. Hommrich, et al. prohibiting Rutherford County from subjecting children to solitary confinement while the case continued. That particular case has since settled for $250,000; however, Trauger had granted the class-action status sought by the ACLU of Tennessee in February 2017. The class encompasses all detainees who were then juveniles held in the Rutherford County Juvenile Detention Center from April 15, 2015 through February 17, 2017. The class-action settled for $11,000,000, but only twenty-three percent of those eligible to receive a portion could be contacted to file a claim, resulting in only $2.2 million being paid out.

On July 2, 2018, in the case Thomas v. Haslam, Trauger struck down a law that would allow Tennessee officials to revoke driver's licenses of defendants who could not pay their court costs, pointing out before issuing the ruling that the law created an incentive for people to drive on revoked licenses. In a ruling on a separate class-action lawsuit that sued for relief from Tennessee Annotated Code § 55-50-502(a)(1)(H), Robinson, et al. v. Purkey, issued on October 16, 2018, Trauger ruled that Tennessee could likewise not revoke drivers' licenses based on their inability to pay traffic fines.

On January 3, 2019, Trauger issued a ruling in the case of United States v. Matthew Charles wherein she ordered Charles' immediate release from prison due to Congressional enactment of the First Step Act. Charles had been mistakenly granted early in 2016 and ordered back to prison by the Sixth Circuit in 2018 after Donald Trump chose not to commute Charles' sentence despite his record as a model inmate. Charles was the first inmate freed under the act authored by Dick Durbin.

In the case League of Women Voters, et al. v. Hargett, et al., Trauger warned that a Tennessee law imposing restrictions on voter registration had "chilling effects" on individuals and organizations attempting to register new voters in Tennessee. On September 12, 2019, Trauger ruled that there was no basis that the law would provide more benefit than harm to Tennesseans. The law would have fined groups that pay workers should too many incomplete registration forms be submitted, and would have criminalized intentional infractions of a new set of rules with misdemeanor charges. Tre Hargett then wrote to the Tennessee legislature to encourage them to repeal the law in question, which was done with the repeal going into effect on April 2, 2020. The ACLU then dropped the suit with the plaintiffs requesting reimbursement for legal expenses from the State, which was awarded by the District Court. Tennessee appealed that decision; however, it was upheld by the Supreme Court of the United States on June 12, 2023.

On July 9, 2021, in the case Bongo Productions LLC, et al. v. Lawrence et al., Trauger issued a preliminary injunction blocking a Tennessee law that would require businesses and other entities that allow transgender people to use the public restroom that matches their preferred gender to post a government-prescribed warning sign. The lawsuit argued that the law violated the First Amendment rights of the businesses by forcing them to post notices that they disagreed with and found offensive. The injunction blocked enforcement of the law while the lawsuit was pending, on the grounds that implementation would cause immediate and irreparable harm. The plaintiffs were granted summary judgement on May 17, 2022, stating in part that the Act failed applicable constitutional standards.

On March 5, 2024, Trauger issued a ruling regarding Concord Music Group, Inc., et al. v. X Corp., d/b/a Twitter in which she found that the platform could not be held directly responsible for the infringements that its users engaged in, but that plaintiffs can present the argument that a lack of DMCA enforcement against serial infringers, despite being aware of the problem, makes X liable. The ruling also acknowledged that if plaintiffs prove the platform intentionally delayed or ignored valid DMCA takedown notices, X may be found liable for contributing to the piracy.

== Honors ==
Some of the honors Judge Trauger has received include:

- 2015 Judge Martha Craig Daughtrey Award
- 2016 honoree for the Academy for Women of Achievement
- 2016 Distinguished Service Award from Vanderbilt University Law School
- 2020 Professionalism Award from the American Inns of Court, for the Sixth Circuit.

Legal offices
Preceded by John Trice Nixon	Judge of the United States District Court for the Middle District of Tennessee; 1998–present	Incumbent
