= Valeria Sinclair-Chapman =

American political scientist

- Education: University of North Carolina-Asheville; Ohio State University
- Scientific career
- Fields: Political science
- Workplaces: Purdue University; University of Rochester

Valeria Sinclair-Chapman is an American political scientist, currently a professor of political science and African-American studies at Purdue University. Sinclair-Chapman studies American political institutions, the representation of minority groups in the United States Congress, and minority political participation, particularly how excluded groups come to be included in American politics.

== Education and early career ==
Sinclair-Chapman attended the University of North Carolina-Asheville from which she obtained a BA in 1991, and then completed an MA and a PhD at Ohio State University, graduating in 2002. After obtaining her PhD, Sinclair-Chapman became a professor at the University of Rochester, where she later became the Director of Graduate Programs in the Kearns Center for Leadership and Diversity. She moved from the University of Rochester to Purdue University in the fall of 2013.

== Career ==
Sinclair-Chapman coauthored a book with Fredrick C. Harris and Brian D. McKenzie, called Countervailing Forces in African-American Political Activism, 1973-1994 and published in 2006. The book uses group-level data to argue that poorer and less educated African Americans, who are more often the victims of crime, are also less likely to be politically active than wealthier African Americans.

In addition to her book and journal articles on African American political participation, minority representation, and American political institutions, Sinclair-Chapman has also published on diversity and inclusion in political science. She is the Director for the Center for Research on Diversity and Inclusion at Purdue. She has contributed analyses for news outlets on topics relating to minority political participation in America.

Sinclair-Chapman is a member of the 2020-2024 editorial leadership of the American Political Science Review, which is the most selective political science journal. She has also been the co-lead editor of Politics, Gender, and Identities, and has been a president of major caucuses within large professional organisations in political science.

== Selected work ==
- Countervailing Forces in African-American Political Activism, 1973-1994 (2006)
- "Diversity in Political Institutions and Congressional Responsiveness to Minority Interests", Political Research Quarterly, with Michael D. Minta (2013)
- "Leveraging Diversity in Political Science for Institutional and Disciplinary Change", PS: Political Science & Politics (2015)
