= Sonia Kennebeck =

Director and filmmaker

Sonia Kennebeck is a film director known for focusing on whistleblowers and national security issues, including United States vs. Reality Winner and Enemies of the State. In 2017 she received The Ridenhour Documentary Film Prize for National Bird, which focused on drone warfare.
