= Reality Winner (film) =

- Theatrical release poster
- Directed by: Sonia Kennebeck
- Produced by: Sonia Kennebeck; Ines Hofmann Kanna
- Cinematography: Torsten Lapp
- Edited by: Maxine Goedicke
- Production companies: Codebreaker Films; Chicken & Egg Pictures; The Berkley Film Foundation; The Reva and David Logan Foundation; Fork Films; XTR
- Distributed by: Codebreaker Films
- Release dates: March 17, 2021 (SXSW); October 11, 2023
- Running time: 93 minutes
- Country: United States
- Language: English

Reality Winner is a 2021 American documentary film, directed and produced by Sonia Kennebeck. Wim Wenders serves as an executive producer. It follows Reality Winner, who leaked a top secret document about Russian interference in the 2016 United States elections to the media.

The film had its world premiere at South by Southwest on March 17, 2021, and was released on October 11, 2023, by Codebreaker Films.

== Synopsis ==
The film follows Reality Winner, who leaked a document about Russian interference in the 2016 United States elections to the media. Winner, Billie Winner-Davis, Brittany Winner, Gary Davis, Betsy Reed, Edward Snowden, John Kiriakou, and Thomas Drake appear in the film, while Natalia Dyer narrates letters and poems by Winner.

== Production ==
Sonia Kennebeck was drawn to Reality Winner's story, meeting with her mother, Billie Winner-Davis, frustrated with the lack of journalists covering the story, Kennebeck was granted access to the family and document. While in prison, Kennebeck attempted to interview Winner, however, was told by prison authorities her request was denied.

Following the film's premiere at South by Southwest, the film was completely re-edited, upon Winner's release from prison, and sitting down for an interview. Kennebeck turned to Kickstarter to raise funds to complete post-production and to self-distribute the film, after struggling to secure distribution.

== Release ==
The film had its world premiere at South by Southwest on March 17, 2021. It also screened at CPH:DOX in April 2021. It was released on October 11, 2023, prior to a video on demand release on October 31, 2023, by Grasshopper Film.

== Reception ==
Reality Winner received positive reviews from film critics. It holds a 91% approval rating on review aggregator website Rotten Tomatoes, based on 22 reviews. On Metacritic, the film holds a rating of 56 out of 100, based on seven critics, indicating "mixed or average" reviews.
