= Charles S. Bullock III =

American political scientist

- Born: Charles Spencer Bullock III; July 22, 1942 (age 84)
- Education: Washington University in St. Louis
- Spouse: Yes
- Children: 2
- Awards: Named a University Professor by the University of Georgia in 2015, two-time winner of the V. O. Key Jr. Award from the Southern Political Science Association
- Scientific career
- Fields: Political science
- Workplaces: University of Georgia School of Public and International Affairs
- Thesis: The Committee Assignments of Freshmen in the House of Representatives, 1947-1967 (1968)

Charles S. Bullock III (born July 22, 1942) is the Richard B. Russell Professor of political science, as well as the Josiah Meigs Distinguished Teaching Professor, at the University of Georgia School of Public and International Affairs. He has taught at the University of Georgia since 1968. He is specifically an expert in Southern Politics, Legislative Politics, Elections and Electoral Systems. Since 1977, he has been the director of the Georgia Legislative Internship Program. He is often quoted in the media as an expert on politics, especially in the Southern United States.

== Education ==
Bullock graduated with a bachelor's degree from William Jewel College in 1964, then earned both his Masters and Ph.D. from Washington University in 1967 and 1968, respectively.

== Works ==
Over the course of his career, Bullock has written, co-written, edited, or co-edited over 30 books and 150 articles. His works have been published in political science, public administration and education journals. His recent works have been The New Politics of the Old South (2014), an analysis of changing political behaviors and demographics in the South, and Redistricting: The Most Political Activity in America (2010), which discusses the possibles changes in redistricting throughout the United States after the United States 2010 Census. He also has many other works, such as Triumph of Voting Rights in the South (2009), Georgia Politics in a State of Change, 2nd edition (2012), and the Oxford Handbook for Southern Politics (2012).

== Awards ==
Bullock has received multiple awards. In 2015, he was named University Professor, and has twice been a senior fellow at Oxford's Rothermere American Institute. He has received the Outstanding Teacher Award by the Department of Political Science, the Honors Program, and the Student Government Association. He has been awarded research grants from the National Science Foundation, the National Institute of Education, the Pew Charitable Trusts, and the American Enterprise Institute. In 1991, he received the William A. Owens Creative Research Award from the University of Georgia. He has been recognized by Georgia Trend Magazine in 2011 and 2012 as one of the most influential Georgians.

== Selected works ==
- The Rise and Fall of the Voting Rights Act (2016), editors Ronald Keith Gaddie, Justin J. Wert.
- The New Politics of the Old South (1998)
- Runoff Elections in the United States (1992)
- David Duke and the Politics of Race in the South (1995)
- Forest Resource Policy (1992)
- Public Policy and Politics in America (1978, 1984)
- Implementation of Civil Rights Policy (1984)
- Public Policy in the Eighties (1983)
- Coercion to Compliance (1976)
- Racial Equality In America (1975)
- Black Political Attitudes (1972)
- Law and Social Change (1972)
- The New Politics (1970)
