= Donald S. Strong =

American political scientist

- Born: Donald Stuart Strong; December 31, 1912; New York City, U.S.
- Died: August 28, 1995 (aged 82); Austin, Texas, U.S.
- Education: Oberlin College; University of Chicago
- Occupation: Political scientist
- Known for: Research contributions

Donald S. Strong (1912–1995) was an American political scientist. He was Professor of Political Science at the University of Alabama from 1946 to 1979. He published research about antisemitism in the 1930s in the United States, African-American voter suppression, and the rise of the Republican Party in the Southern United States.

== Early life ==
Donald Stuart Strong was born on December 31, 1912, in New York City.

Strong graduated from Oberlin College with a Bachelor of Arts degree in 1934. He received a PhD in Political Science from the University of Chicago in 1939.

== Academic career ==
Strong taught Political Science at Case Western Reserve University from 1937 to 1939, and at the University of Texas at Austin from 1939 to 1947. He published his first book, Organized Anti-Semitism in America: The Rise of Group Prejudice During the Decade 1930-40, in 1941. A year later, in 1942, he published an essay entitled Anti-Revolutionary, Anti-Semitic Organizations in the United States Since 1933.

Strong was Professor of Political Science at the University of Alabama from 1946 to 1979. He served as the President of the Southern Political Science Association from 1970 to 1971. He was the editor of The Journal of Politics from 1971 to 1974.

Early in his career, Strong assisted V. O. Key, Jr. in his research for Southern Politics in State and Nation, which became a classic of political science. Later, Strong became an authority for his research on the rise of the Republican Party in the Southern United States at an early stage. He also exposed white supremacist efforts to suppress African-American voting in the South.

== Death ==
Strong died on August 28, 1995, in Austin, Texas.

== Bibliography ==
- Organized Anti-Semitism in America: The Rise of Group Prejudice During the Decade 1930-40 (Washington, D.C., American Council on Public Affairs, 1941, 191 pages).
- Southern Primaries and Elections, 1920-1949 (Tuscaloosa, Alabama: University of Alabama Press, 1950, 206 pages).
- Registration of Voters in Alabama (Tuscaloosa, Alabama: University of Alabama Press, 1956, 135 pages).
- Urban Republicanism in the South (Tuscaloosa, Alabama: University of Alabama Press, 1960, 69 pages).
- Negroes, Ballots, and Judges: National Voting Rights Legislation in the Federal Courts (Tuscaloosa, Alabama: University of Alabama Press, 1968, 100 pages).
- Issue Voting and Party Realignment (Tuscaloosa, Alabama: University of Alabama Press, 1977, 110 pages).
