= Christopher Wlezien =

American academic (born 1961)

- Born: April 25, 1961 (age 65); Chicago, Illinois, U.S.
- Education: Saint Xavier University (AB); University of Iowa (PhD)
- Children: 2
- Scientific career
- Fields: Political science, public opinion
- Workplaces: University of Houston (1995–2001); University of Oxford (2001–2005); Temple University (2005–2013); University of Texas at Austin (2013–present)
- Thesis: The Political Economy of the Budgetary Process (1989)
- Doctoral advisor: Peverill Squire

Christopher Wlezien (born April 25, 1961) is the Hogg Professor of Government at the University of Texas at Austin. He previously taught at the University of Oxford, Temple University, and the University of Houston, and has affiliations with other universities in the US and elsewhere. Wlezien teaches and researches in a number of areas, including public opinion, elections, institutions, policy, and research methodology. A long-standing research project develops and tests a "thermostatic" model of public opinion and policy in the US and other countries, recent work on which examines the mediating role of news coverage. He has published many journal articles and chapters. In addition, he has also written books including Degrees of Democracy, The Timeline of Elections, and Who Gets Represented among others. In 2024, Wlezien was elected to the American Academy of Arts and Sciences.
