= Rick Bragg =

American journalist and writer

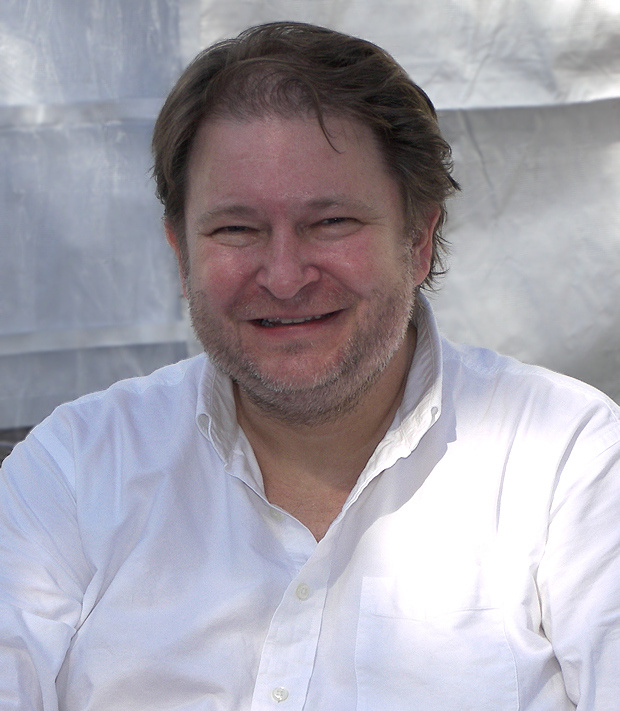
- Bragg at the Texas Book Festival in 2008
- Born: Ricky Edward Bragg; Piedmont, Alabama, U.S.
- Occupations: Writer, journalist

Rick Bragg is an American journalist and writer known for non-fiction books, especially those about his family in Alabama. He won a Pulitzer Prize in 1996 recognizing his work at The New York Times.

== Early life ==
Bragg was born in the small city of Piedmont in northeastern Alabama and grew up in the small community of Possum Trot near Jacksonville. He credited his ability to write to listening to his family tell stories. He was raised primarily by his mother, as his father was an alcoholic and was rarely home. His relatives were also very involved in his young life, and greatly influenced his personal and emotional development.

== Career ==
Bragg worked at several newspapers before joining the New York Times in 1994. He covered murders and unrest in Haiti as a metro reporter, then wrote about the Oklahoma City bombing, the 1998 Westside Middle School shooting, and the Susan Smith trial as a national correspondent based in Atlanta. He later became the paper's Miami bureau chief prior to Elián González's arrival and the international controversy surrounding the Cuban boy. Bragg won the Pulitzer Prize for his work.

Bragg has authored eleven books: All Over But the Shoutin', Ava's Man, Somebody Told Me: The Newspaper Stories of Rick Bragg, The Prince of Frogtown, I Am a Soldier Too: The Jessica Lynch Story, the authorized biography of American POW Jessica Lynch, The Most They Ever Had, Jerry Lee Lewis: His Own Story, My Southern Journey, The Best Cook in the World: Tales From My Momma's Table, Where I Come from: Stories from the Deep South and The Speckled Beauty: A Dog and His People.

Bragg's book All Over But the Shoutin' tells the story of his childhood in Alabama, his rise to becoming a journalist, his personal struggles and the stories of the people he cares about. The book pays special attention to his struggles with his abusive, alcoholic father, and the story of his mother who raised Bragg and his two brothers on her own.

=== Controversy ===
On May 28, 2003, after being given a two-week suspension for writing a story that was reported by an uncredited stringer, Bragg resigned from the New York Times.

For the story, an account of Florida Gulf Coast oystermen culture he had written the year before, Bragg relied on the reporting of volunteer intern J. Wes Yoder. The article ran with a dateline of Apalachicola, Florida, and began:

"The anchor is made from the crankshaft of a junked car, the hull is stained with bottom muck, but the big Johnson outboard motor is brand new. Chugging softly, it pushes the narrow oyster boat over Apalachicola Bay, gently intruding on the white egrets that slip like paper airplanes just overhead, and the jumping mullet that belly-flop with a sharp clap into steel-gray water."

The Washington Post reported that "Bragg freely admits that he sent his intern, Yoder, who was compensated only with lunch and rent money, on the boat." A review by the Times found that while Bragg "indeed visited Apalachicola briefly and wrote the article, the interviewing and reporting on the scene were done by a freelance journalist, J. Wes Yoder. The article should have carried Mr. Yoder's byline with Mr. Bragg's."

Bragg's defense — that it is common for Times correspondents to slip in and out of cities to "get the dateline" while relying on the work of stringers, researchers, interns and clerks — was contested by Times reporters, and sparked "more passionate disagreement than the clear-cut fraud and plagiarism committed by fellow reporter Jayson Blair."

== Later career ==
Bragg has taught writing in colleges and in newspaper newsrooms. He now works as a writing professor at the University of Alabama's journalism program in its College of Communication and Information Sciences and writes a column for Southern Living.

His 2008 book, The Prince of Frogtown, explores his father's life in Bragg's hometown of Jacksonville, Alabama.

== Awards ==
Bragg won the 1996 Pulitzer Prize for Feature Writing, citing "his elegantly written stories about contemporary America". He has received more than 50 writing awards in 20 years, including the American Society of Newspaper Editors' Distinguished Writing Award twice. In 1992, he was awarded a Nieman Fellowship at Harvard University.

== Works ==
External videos
- Presentation by Bragg on All Over But the Shoutin', November 9, 1997, C-SPAN
- Interview with Bragg on All Over But the Shoutin', September 27, 1998, C-SPAN
- Presentation by Bragg on All Over But the Shoutin', March 19, 1999, C-SPAN
- Presentation by Bragg on Somebody Told Me, July 27, 2000, C-SPAN
- Booknotes interview with Bragg on Somebody Told Me, October 15, 2000, C-SPAN
- Presentation by Bragg on Ava's Man, August 25, 2001, C-SPAN
- Presentation by Bragg on All Over But the Shoutin', June 7, 2003, C-SPAN
- Interview with Bragg on The Most They Ever Had, November 1, 2011, C-SPAN
- Presentation by Bragg on My Southern Journey, October 10, 2015, C-SPAN

- Bragg, Rick (March 16, 1999). All Over But the Shoutin′. Random House Value Publishing. ISBN 0-517-36162-0.
- Bragg, Rick (November 1, 1999). Wooden Churches: A Celebration. Algonquin Books. ISBN 1-56512-233-X.
- Bragg, Rick (August 28, 2001). Somebody Told Me: The Newspaper Stories of Rick Bragg. Vintage; 1st Vintage Books edition. ISBN 0-375-72552-0.
- Bragg, Rick (August 13, 2002). Ava's Man. Vintage; 1st Vintage Books edition. ISBN 0-375-72444-3.
- Bragg, Rick (2003). I Am a Soldier, Too: The Jessica Lynch Story. New York: Alfred A. Knopf. ISBN 1-4000-4257-7.
- Bragg, Rick (May 6, 2008). The Prince of Frogtown. Random House. ISBN 978-0-7393-2796-8.
- Bragg, Rick (October 2009). The Most They Ever Had. MacAdam/Cage. ISBN 978-1-59692-361-4.
- Bragg, Rick (October 2014). Jerry Lee Lewis: His Own Story. HarperCollins. ISBN 978-0-06-207822-3.
- Bragg, Rick (September 2015) My Southern Journey: True Stories from the Heart of the South. ISBN 978-0-8487-4639-1
- Bragg, Rick (April 2018). The Best Cook in the World: Tales From My Momma's Table. Alfred A. Knopf. ISBN 978-1400040414.
- Bragg, Rick (October 2020). Where I Come from: Stories from the Deep South. Alfred A. Knopf. ISBN 9780593317785.
- Bragg, Rick (August 2021). The Speckled Beauty: A Dog and His People, Lost and Found. Alfred A. Knopf. ISBN 978-0525658818.
