= Marian Irish =

American political scientist (1909–2001)

Marian D. Irish
- Born: 1909; Scranton, Pennsylvania
- Died: 2001
- Education: Barnard College; Bryn Mawr College; Harvard University
- Scientific career
- Fields: Political science
- Workplaces: Florida State University; American University
- Doctoral students: Mary M. Lepper

Marian Doris Irish (1909 – 2001) was an American political scientist. She was Chair of the Department of Government at Florida State University, and was the Charles O. Lerche Jr. Professor of International Relations at the School of International Service in American University. She was also the President of the Southern Political Science Association.

== Life and career ==
Irish was born in 1909 in Scranton, Pennsylvania. She attended Barnard College, graduating in 1930 with a B.A. degree. After completing her degree, she worked for a year at Lafayette College. Irish then obtained an M.A. in 1931 from Bryn Mawr College, and a PhD in 1939 from Harvard University. After completing her PhD, she joined the faculty of Florida State University (then the Florida State College for Women). She remained there for 33 years, and for fourteen years she was the Chair of the Government Department there. In 1967, Irish moved to the School of International Service at American University, where she became the Charles O. Lerche Jr. Professor of International Relations. She retired in 1974.

Irish studied the politics of the United States in the mid-1900s. She coauthored the American politics textbook The Politics of American Democracy with James Prothro, which was released in 5 editions by 1973. With Elke Frank, Irish co-authored Introduction to Comparative Politics: Thirteen Nation States, which was re-published in a second edition in 1977. Irish and Frank also coauthored the 1975 book U.S. foreign policy: Context, conduct, content, which is an overview of American foreign policy after the end of World War II. U.S. foreign policy focused largely on the roles of the legislative and executive branches of the United States government in the making of American foreign policy. Irish published a symposium series in the Journal of Politics which, on the 30th anniversary of that journal's publication, was reprinted as an essay collection, called Political Science: Advance of the Discipline.

Irish was the 1956–1957 President of the Southern Political Science Association. She was also active in the development of higher education in the state of Florida throughout the mid-20th century. In 2002, the Southern Political Science Association created an annual award in her memory, called the Marian Irish Award. Florida State University also created a Marian D. Irish Professorship.

== Selected works ==
- The Politics of American Democracy, coauthored with James Prothro (1973)
- U.S. foreign policy: Context, conduct, content (1975)
- Introduction to Comparative Politics: Thirteen Nation States, coauthored with Elke Frank (1977, 2nd Ed)
- Political Science: Advance of the Discipline (1978)
