= Laurie A. Rudman =

American psychologist

- Education: University of Minnesota
- Scientific career
- Fields: Social psychology
- Workplaces: Rutgers, The State University of New Jersey

Laurie A. Rudman is a social psychology feminist professor as well as the Director of the Rutgers University Social Cognition Laboratory who has contributed a great deal of research to studies on implicit and explicit attitudes and stereotypes, stereotype maintenance processes, and the media's effects on attitudes, stereotypes, and behavior on the Feminism movement. She was awarded the 1994 Gordon Allport Intergroup Relations Prize (with Eugene Borgida) for her research examining the effects of sexist advertising on men's behavior toward female job applicants.

== Research ==
Rudman has also produced several significant studies, including "Prescriptive Gender Stereotypes and Backlash Toward Agentic Women", "Implicit and Explicit Attitudes Toward Female Authority" and "Implicit and Explicit Consequences of Exposure to Violent and Misogynous Rap Music".

Rudman's 2007 Sex Roles publication, "The interpersonal power of feminism: Is feminism good for relationships?" was well known in that it made the assertion that feminists make better lovers than non-feminists and sparked a stir in the academic community. Her research challenges stereotypes that feminists are "unattractive, man-haters".

=== Implicit Gender Stereotypes ===
One of Rudman's primary interests is in exploring implicit ways of assessing attitudes, stereotypes, self-concept and identity. Rudman's 2001 paper with Anthony Greenwald and Debbie McGhee used the Implicit-association test to investigate implicit self-concept and evaluative implicit gender stereotypes. This paper discussed several experiments exploring these gender stereotypes, and exploring possible reasons for the stereotypes.

Experiment 1 looked at sex differences in gender stereotypes (e.g., men are associated with power and women are associated with warmth). For this experiment, the IAT was used to look at how much male vs female names were associated with power, and how much male vs female names were associated with warmth. The results of this experiment showed an unexpected result that only males associated men with power, and only women associated females with warmth.

Experiment 2 showed dramatically reduced sex differences in gender-power judgments when measures were redesigned to avoid implying that power was positive. To do this, Rudman and her colleagues manipulated the valence (positive, negative, or neutral) of words related to power (like strong, solid, and steel) and weak (like weak, thin, and twig), and again used the IAT to measure associations between these words and males and females. As the meaning of these words changed from negative, to neutral, to positive, the difference between male-power associations and female-power associations lessened, showing that the valence of the word made a difference in gender associations. The results of this study showed a stereotype of males being strong from men and women when the valence of the words (strong vs weak etc.) was removed.

The results of Experiment 3 and 4 suggest that the sex differences in Experiment 2 were due to the tendency to associated the self with desirable traits. These experiments showed correlations between linking the "self" to favorable traits, and linking their gender to the favorable traits as well.

Despite the unexpected sex differences in evaluative gender stereotypes found in the first study, Rudman published their results which resulted in the Balanced Identity Theory which helps explain the surprising results by theorizing that balance-congruity serves to create links between existing identity associations. For instance, "Me" is associated with "good" as well as "female." Since both "good" and "female" and linked to "Me", they will develop a link such that "female" is associated more strongly to be "good." In the context of Rudman's study, women are more likely to associate strength with female since they are female and likely see themselves as strong, so the association between strength and female is stronger. In this way, perceptions and prejudices are biased towards positive conceptions of ourselves. However, this can also promote dissociations for imbalances in self-identity. For instance, stereotypes such as "male-math", with their gender identity ("me-female"), can lead to dissociations (me ≠ math) as studied by Nosek, Banaji, and Greenwald (2002).

== Selected works ==
- Rudman, Laurie A. (March 1998). "Self-promotion as a risk factor for women: The costs and benefits of counterstereotypical impression management". Journal of Personality and Social Psychology. 74 (3): 629–645. doi:10.1037/0022-3514.74.3.629. PMID 9523410. Pdf.
- Rudman, Laurie A.; Glick, Peter (November 1999). "Feminized management and backlash toward agentic women: The hidden costs to women of a kinder, gentler image of middle managers". Journal of Personality and Social Psychology. 77 (5): 1004–1010. doi:10.1037/0022-3514.77.5.1004. PMID 10573877. S2CID 35434581.
- Rudman, Laurie A.; Kilianski, Stephen E. (2000). "Implicit and explicit attitudes toward female authority". Personality and Social Psychology Bulletin. 26 (11): 1315–1328. doi:10.1177/0146167200263001. S2CID 6962810. Pdf.
- Rudman, Laurie A.; Glick, Peter (Winter 2001). "Prescriptive gender stereotypes and backlash toward agentic women". Journal of Social Issues. 57 (4): 743–762. doi:10.1111/0022-4537.00239. hdl:2027.42/146421. Pdf.
- Rudman, Laurie A.; Ashmore, Richard D.; Gary, Melvin L. (November 2001). ""Unlearning" automatic biases: the malleability of implicit prejudice and stereotypes". Journal of Personality and Social Psychology. 81 (5): 856–868. doi:10.1037/0022-3514.81.5.856. PMID 11708562. Pdf.
- Rudman, Laurie A.; Greenwald, Anthony G.; Banaji, Mahzarin R.; Farnham, Shelly D.; Nosek, Brian A.; Mellott, Deborah S. (January 2002). "A unified theory of implicit attitudes, stereotypes, self-esteem, and self-concept". Psychological Review. 109 (1): 3–25. doi:10.1037/0033-295X.109.1.3. PMID 11863040.
- Rudman, Laurie A.; Fairchild, Kimberly (August 2004). "Reactions to counterstereotypic behavior: the role of backlash in cultural stereotype maintenance". Journal of Personality and Social Psychology. 87 (2): 157–176. doi:10.1037/0022-3514.87.2.157. PMID 15301625.
- Rudman, Laurie A.; Phelan, Julie E. (December 2007). "The interpersonal power of feminism: is feminism good for romantic relationships?". Sex Roles. 57 (11): 787–799. doi:10.1007/s11199-007-9319-9. S2CID 62792118. Pdf.
