= Dara Strolovitch =

American political scientist

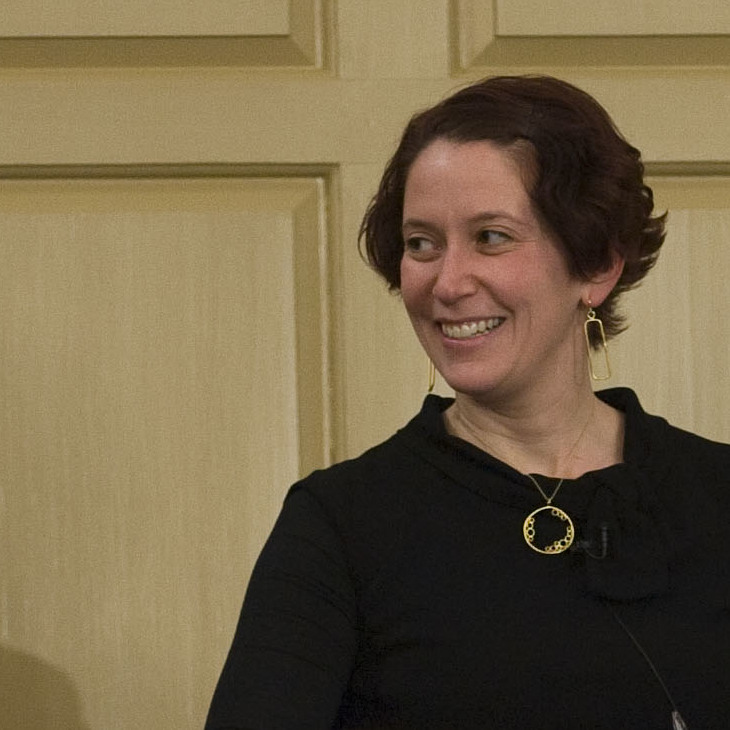
- Dara Strolovitch in 2011 at the Miller Centre
- Education: Vassar College; Yale University
- Awards: Mansbridge Award; Outstanding Career Award, MPSA Women's Caucus
- Scientific career
- Fields: Political science; Gender and sexuality studies; African American Studies
- Workplaces: Yale University; Princeton University; University of Minnesota

Dara Strolovitch is a Canadian-American political scientist, currently Professor of Women's Gender, and Sexuality Studies, American Studies, and Political Science at Yale University. She studies the politics of race, class, gender, and sexuality in the context of intersectional societal inequality, and the representation of those who are marginalized in multiple overlapping ways.

== Education and early career ==
Strolovitch attended Vassar College, earning an AB in political science with a minor in women's studies in 1992. She attended Yale University for graduate school, earning an MA in political science in 1998, an MPhil in political science in 2002, and a PhD in political science also in 2002. Between 2000 and 2001, she was a research fellow at The Brookings Institution. In 2001, Strolovitch became a professor of political science at the University of Minnesota, before moving to Princeton University in 2013. She has been a visiting scholar at Georgetown University, Stanford University, and The Russell Sage Foundation.

In 2021, she was hired by Yale University as a full professor.

== Career ==
Strolovitch's first book, published in 2007, is called Affirmative Advocacy: Race, Class, and Gender in Interest Group Politics. Strolovitch uses a survey and interviews to study the political representation of interest groups, with a theory of interest group effectiveness that builds on the idea of intersectionality. The findings of the book include evidence that already advantaged groups are better represented by interest group politics than disadvantaged groups are, and that often interest groups focus more on the legislative and executive branches of the US government than they do on the judicial branch. In reviewing the book, Bryan D. Jones wrote that "the empiricism is as strong or stronger than the best of the existing interest group studies". Affirmative Advocacy received multiple awards from caucuses of the American Political Science Association, as well as an award from the American Sociological Association, and excerpts have been used in American politics textbooks.

Strolovitch also co-edited the CQ Guide to Interest Groups and Lobbying with Burdett Loomis and Peter Francia, and she has a forthcoming book called When Bad Things Happen to Privileged People: Race, Gender, and the Political Construction of Crisis & Non-Crisis.

Strolovitch is a member of the 2020-2024 editorial leadership of the American Political Science Review, which is the most selective political science journal. She was also a founding associate editor of the Journal of Race, Ethnicity, and Politics.

Strolovitch has written and been cited extensively in media outlets like The Washington Post, Vox, Mic, and Glamour.

== Selected works ==
- Green, Donald P.; Strolovitch, Dara Z.; Wong, Janelle S. (September 1998). "Defended Neighborhoods, Integration, and Racially Motivated Crime". American Journal of Sociology. 104 (2): 372–403. doi:10.1086/210042. S2CID 143636461.
- Strolovitch, Dara Z. (November 2006). "Do Interest Groups Represent the Disadvantaged? Advocacy at the Intersections of Race, Class, and Gender". The Journal of Politics. 68 (4): 894–910. doi:10.1111/j.1468-2508.2006.00478.x. S2CID 153662090.
- Affirmative advocacy : race, class, and gender in interest group politics. Chicago: University of Chicago Press. 2007. ISBN 9780226777405.
- When Bad Things Happen to Privileged People : Race, Gender, and What Makes a Crisis in America. Chicago: University of Chicago Press. 6 July 2023. ISBN 9780226798813. Forthcoming

== Selected awards ==
- 2010 Best Paper Award, APSA section on Political Organizations and Parties
- 2016 Mansbridge Award, National Women's Caucus for Political Science
- 2018 Outstanding Career Award, Midwest Political Science Association Women's Caucus
