= National Bird (film) =

- Theatrical release poster
- Directed by: Sonia Kennebeck
- Produced by: Sonia Kennebeck; Ines Hofmann Kanna
- Cinematography: Torsten Lapp
- Edited by: Maxine Goedicke
- Music by: Insa Rudolph
- Production companies: Ten Forward Films; ITVS; Corporation for Public Broadcasting; NDR; Deutscher Filmförderfonds; Filmförderung; Hamburg Schleswig-Holstein; Kuratorium Junger Deutscher Film
- Distributed by: FilmRise
- Release dates: February 14, 2016 (Berlinale); November 11, 2016 (United States)
- Running time: 92 minutes
- Countries: United States; Germany
- Language: English
- Box office: $10,656

National Bird is a 2016 American-German documentary film directed and produced by Sonia Kennebeck. Wim Wenders and Errol Morris serve as executive producers.

The film had its world premiere at the Berlin International Film Festival on February 11, 2016. It was released in the United States on November 11, 2016, by FilmRise.

== Synopsis ==
The film focuses on three whistleblowers who talk about unmanned aerial vehicles commonly called drones.

== Release ==
The film had its world premiere at the Berlin International Film Festival on February 14, 2016. Shortly after, FilmRise acquired U.S. distribution rights to the film. It also screened at the Tribeca Film Festival on April 16, 2016. The film was released in the United States on November 11, 2016. It was broadcast on Independent Lens on May 1, 2017.

== Reception ==
=== Critical reception ===
National Bird received positive reviews from film critics. It holds a 100% approval rating on review aggregator website Rotten Tomatoes, based on 22 reviews, with a weighted average of 8.30/10. On Metacritic, the film holds a rating of 75 out of 100, based on 11 critics, indicating "generally favorable reviews".

Peter Debruge of Variety gave the film a positive review writing: "Chilling testimony from those three veterans, each of whom helped to wage war from behind consoles half a world away, serves as the backbone of a film that adds its voice to mounting criticism of the U.S. drone program." Alex Needham of The Guardian gave the film four out of five stars writing: "With stealth and elegance, Kennebeck brings these alarming truths into the light."

== See also ==
- List of films featuring drones
- Uruzgan helicopter attack - the attack featured in this film
