= Julie Novkov =

American political scientist

- Education: Harvard College; Radcliffe College; New York University; University of Michigan
- Awards: Collins Fellowship; 2009 Ralph Bunche Award
- Scientific career
- Fields: Political science
- Workplaces: University of Oregon; University at Albany, SUNY

Julie Novkov is an American political scientist, currently serving as the Dean of Rockefeller College of Public Affairs & Policy but also a professor of political science and women's, gender, and sexuality studies at the University at Albany, SUNY. She studies the history of American law, American political development, and subordinated identities, with a focus on how laws are used for social control while also being affected by social reform movements.

== Early career and education ==
Novkov attended Harvard and Radcliffe Colleges, earning an AB in 1989. After graduating, she attended the New York University School of Law, obtaining a JD in 1992. Novkov then became a graduate student in political science at the University of Michigan, receiving an MA in 1994 and a PhD in 1998. Her PhD dissertation was entitled Sex and Substantive Due Process: The Gendered Nature of Constitutional Development. In 1996, Novkov became a professor in the department of political science at the University of Oregon.

== Career ==
Novkov remained at the University of Oregon for 10 years, from 1996 to 2006. In 2006, she moved to the University at Albany, SUNY. From 2011 to 2017 she was the chair of the political science department at SUNY Albany. From 2018 to 2021 she was the director of undergraduate studies in that department, and from 2008 to 2011 she was the director of graduate studies. She became a Collins Fellow at SUNY Albany in 2017. She was named interim dean of the College in 2021 and permanent dean in 2023.

Novkov's first book, Constituting Workers, Protecting Women: Gender, Law, and Labor in the Progressive Era and New Deal Years, was published in 2001. Novkov argues that gender is a crucial analytical category in the modern legal system, and specifically that "much of the doctrinal framework for the modern interventionist state arose through battles over female workers' proper relationships with the state." To establish the gendered origins of modern employment laws, Novkov draws on hundreds of cases that concerned labor issues between 1873 and 1937, from both the state and federal level.

In 2008, Novkov published her second book, Racial Union: Law, Intimacy, and the White State in Alabama, 1865–1954. This book studies the history and use of bans on interracial marriage in Alabama, which retained language against interracial marriages until 2000. Novkov separates the legal history of Alabama's anti-miscegenation law into several periods within the span 1865–1954, and uses the legal trends within each period to argue that the anti-miscegenation law was being used as a tool of state-building. This places anti-miscegenation laws at the center of developing and securing a regime of white supremacy in the state. Racial Union won the American Political Science Association's 2009 Ralph Bunche Award, which is given "for the best scholarly work in political science published in the previous calendar year that explores the phenomenon of ethnic and cultural pluralism."

Novkov also wrote a text that introduces and explores the relationship between the American Supreme Court and its president, called The Supreme Court and the Presidency: Struggles for Supremacy and published in 2013. In addition to publishing in political science journals, she has also published extensively in law reviews, and has served as an editor for several books.

Novkov is a member of the 2020–2024 editorial leadership of the American Political Science Review, which is the most selective political science journal. She has previously served on the editorial board of five other journals.

Novkov's work has been cited in media reports on topics like interracial marriage laws, bias in academia, and political divisions in America. Novkov is a regular contributor to the American politics website A House Divided.

== Selected works ==
- Constituting Workers, Protecting Women: Gender, Law, and Labor in the Progressive Era and New Deal Years, 2001
- Racial Union: Law, Intimacy, and the White State in Alabama, 1865–1954, 2008
- The Supreme Court and the Presidency: Struggles for Supremacy, 2013

== Selected awards ==
- 2009 Ralph Bunche Award, American Political Science Association
- 2015 President's Award for Excellence in Teaching, University at Albany, SUNY
- Collins Fellowship, University at Albany, SUNY
