= Lawrence Dodd =

American political scientist

Lawrence Cloyd Dodd
- Born: December 11, 1946 (age 79); Greenville, Texas
- Education: University of Minnesota (PhD)
- Spouse: Leslie Anderson
- Children: Meredith M. Dodd and Christopher S. Dodd
- Scientific career
- Fields: Political Science
- Institutions: University of Florida
- Thesis: Coalitions in Parliamentary Government (1972)

Lawrence "Larry" Cloyd Dodd (born December 11, 1946) is an American political scientist and the Manning J. Dauer Eminent Scholar in Political Science at the University of Florida. He specializes in the study of the legislatures, most notably the United States Congress. He has also completed work in comparative politics, examining parliamentary systems. Dodd previously held teaching positions at the University of Texas (1972–1980), Indiana University-Bloomington (1980–1986), and at the University of Colorado (1986–1995).

Dodd previously served as president of the Southern Political Science Association (2013–2014), and chaired the Legislative Studies Section of the American Political Science Association (2007–2009). From 2003 to 2004, he served as a fellow at the Woodrow Wilson Center. Dodd currently serves on the Editorial Board of the American Political Science Review.

== Personal life ==
Dodd was born to Cloyd Oscar Dodd and Louise Pierce Dodd in Greenville, Texas, on December 11, 1946. He has one brother, D. Michael Dodd, a lawyer. During his childhood, Dodd lived in Greenville, Shreveport, Louisiana, and Iowa Park, Texas. He graduated from Iowa Park High School in 1964, and subsequently earned his bachelor's degree in government and history from Midwestern State University in 1968. He initially attended Tulane University for graduate school but transferred to the University of Minnesota, where he graduated with a doctorate in political science in 1972.

During his career, Dodd's received a Ford Foundation Fellowship, Congressional Fellowship, and a Hoover National Fellowship.

== Publications ==
=== Books ===
- Coalitions in Parliamentary Government. 1976.
- Congress Reconsidered. Ten Editions: 1977–2013.
- Congress and the Administrative State: Viewpoints on American Politics. 1979.
- New Perspectives on American Politics. 1993.
- The Dynamics Of American Politics: Approaches And Interpretations. 1993.
- Participatory Democracy Versus Elitist Democracy: Lessons from Brazil. 2003.
- Learning Democracy: Citizen Engagement and Electoral Choice in Nicaragua, 1990-2001. 2005.
- Thinking About Congress: Essays on Congressional Change. 2012.

=== Selected articles ===
- Committee Integration In the Senate: A Comparative Analysis. The Journal of Politics. 1972.
- Party Coalitions in Multiparty Parliaments: A Game-Theoretic Analysis. American Political Science Review. 1974.
- Nicaragua Votes: The Elections of 2001. Journal of Democracy. 2002.
- Congress in a Downsian World: Polarization Cycles and Regime Change. The Journal of Politics. 2015.
