= Mignon Nixon =

American academic

- Born: Mignon Elizabeth Nixon
- Education: Harvard University; City University of New York
- Occupation: Academic
- Known for: Professor at University College London
- Spouse: Gregory D. Smith
- Parent(s): John Trice Nixon; Betty C. Nixon
- Relatives: Herman Clarence Nixon (paternal grandfather)

Mignon Nixon is an American academic. She serves as the Professor of Modern and Contemporary Art History at University College London in London, United Kingdom.

== Early life ==
Mignon Elizabeth Nixon is the daughter of John Trice Nixon, a United States federal judge, and Betty C. Nixon, a former city councillor in Nashville, Tennessee. Her paternal grandfather, Herman Clarence Nixon, was a political scientist at Vanderbilt University and a member of the Southern Agrarians.

Nixon graduated from Harvard University and received a PhD from the City University of New York.

== Career ==
Nixon is a professor at University College London. She specialises in sexuality and aggression in art since 1945, with particular reference to feminism and gender politics.

Nixon was a fellow at the Sterling and Francine Clark Art Institute, and a Terra Foundation for American Art Senior Scholar in 2007. She is a co-editor of October magazine.

== Personal life ==
Nixon married Gregory D. Smith, a direct descendant of Stephen A. Douglas, in 1995.

== Selected publications ==
- Fantastic Reality: Louise Bourgeois and a Story of Modern Art (2005).
- "Losing Louise," October 134 (Fall 2010), pp. 122–132.
- "The Undiscovered Country" (on Kept Alive, by Nira Pereg), Artforum (October 2010).
- "Roni Horn," Artforum, vol. 48, no. 1 (September 2009), pp. 282–283.
- "Blood Lust," Photoworks Issue 11. (Autumn-Winter 2008), pp. 40–41. Brighton: Photoworks, 2008.
- "Book of Tongues," in Nancy Spero: Dissidances. Barcelona and Madrid: Museu d’Art Contemporáni and Museu National Centro de Art Reina Sofia, 2008, pp. 21–53.
- "Feminist Time: A Conversation," Grey Room 31 (Spring 2008), pp. 33–67.
- "Spero’s Curses," October 122 (Fall 2007), pp. 3–30.
- "War Inside/War Outside: Feminist Critiques and the Politics of Psychoanalysis," Texte zur Kunst, vol. 17, no. 68 (December 2007), pp. 65–75, pp. 134–138.
- "o + x," October 119 (Winter 2007), pp. 6–20.
