= Carl Brent Swisher =

- Born: April 28, 1897; Lewis County, West Virginia
- Died: June 14, 1968 (aged 71); Baltimore, Maryland
- Known for: Biographies of United States Supreme Court justices
- Spouse: Idella Gwatkin (m. 1929–1968)
- Children: Carolyn Swisher Mathiasen; Mary Virginia Swisher
- Parents: James Edwin Swisher; Annie Gertrude Reger

Academic background
- Education: Pomona College; Robert Brookings Graduate School

Academic work
- Discipline: History
- Sub-discipline: Legal history
- Institutions: Columbia University; Johns Hopkins University

Carl Brent Swisher (April 28, 1897 – June 14, 1968) was an American political scientist and historian who was an expert on the history of the Supreme Court of the United States. He was particularly recognized for his biographies of Supreme Court justices, including Stephen J. Field and Roger B. Taney. He was the Thomas P. Stran Professor of Political Science at Johns Hopkins University from 1938 until his death in 1968. He was president of the Southern Political Science Association in 1956–57 and of the American Political Science Association in 1959–60.
