= Michelle Dion =

American political scientist

Michelle Lynn Dion
- Education: University of Texas at Austin; University of North Carolina at Chapel Hill
- Scientific career
- Fields: Political science
- Workplaces: McMaster University; Georgia Institute of Technology

Michelle Dion is a political scientist, currently a professor in the department of political science and the Senator William McMaster Chair in Gender and Methodology at McMaster University, as well as the founding director of McMaster University's Centre for Research in Empirical Social Sciences. Dion studies the political economy of Latin America, the history of social welfare policies, political methodology, and comparative political behaviour with a focus on attitudes, gender, and sexuality in politics.

== Early career and education ==
Dion received a BA in Latin American studies with a concentration in government from the University of Texas at Austin in 1996. She then attended the University of North Carolina at Chapel Hill for graduate school, obtaining an MA in political science in 1998 and a PhD in political science in 2002. Her major concentration in her PhD was comparative politics, and her minor concentration was political methodology.

== Career ==
After completing her PhD in 2002, Dion became an assistant professor in the Sam Nunn School of International Affairs at the Georgia Institute of Technology. From 2004 to 2005, she was a Fulbright Professor at the Centro de Investigación y Docencia Económicas in Mexico City. In 2009, she left the Georgia Institute of Technology to become a professor at McMaster University. She has also taught at the Monterrey Institute of Technology and Higher Education and the Inter-university Consortium for Political and Social Research.

Dion's book, Workers and Welfare: Comparative Institutional Change in Twentieth-Century Mexico, was published in 2010. The book was reviewed as "the most comprehensive account of Mexico's welfare institutions and policies". The book analysed the development of Mexican social welfare policy over nine decades, focusing on the period since 1980, arguing that its evolution was a function both of coalitions of organised labour and also the creation of state institutions like enlarged state administrative capacity.

In addition to her comparative and historical work, Dion has published on political methodology in journals such as Political Analysis. Dion is a member of the Visions in Methodology organisation, and has worked on major projects to improve instruction in political science methodology. From 2010 to 2015, she was the director of development for the Online Portal for Social Science Education in Methodology.

Dion is a member of the 2020–2024 editorial leadership of the American Political Science Review, which is the most selective political science journal.

Dion has also used her expertise in empirical social science to assist local and communal causes. She was a coauthor of the report Mapping the void: Two-spirit and LGBTIQ+ experiences in Hamilton, an empirical study of the insufficient resources for two-spirit and LGBTIQ+ residents of Hamilton, Ontario. The study included a coauthor from the City of Hamilton and one from the AIDS Network, and it used survey research methods to study the well-being of LGBTIQ+ and two-spirit people in the city, with a particular focus on how few dedicated public spaces remain available for those individuals in Hamilton. She has also been credited with playing a "pivotal role" in McMaster University's efforts to fix its gendered pay gap, as she authored a study on the topic which prompted the university to reduce its pay gap by raising the salaries of the women on its faculty. For this effort, she was given the Award of Distinction from the Ontario Confederation of University Faculty Associations.

Dion has contributed expert commentary to various media outlets on issues like gender pay gaps among faculty members and citation gaps between men and women academics.

== Selected works ==
- "Eradication efforts, the state, displacement and poverty: Explaining coca cultivation in Colombia during Plan Colombia". Journal of Latin American Studies. 2008, with Catherine Russler
- "Economic development, income inequality, and preferences for redistribution". International Studies Quarterly. 2010, with Vicki Birchfield
- Workers and Welfare: Comparative Institutional Change in Twentieth-Century Mexico (2010)
- "How Many Citations to Women Is "Enough"? Estimates of Gender Representation in Political Science". PS: Political Science & Politics. 2020, with Sara McLaughlin Mitchell

== Selected awards ==
- 2016 Award of Distinction, from the Ontario Confederation of University Faculty Associations
- 2019 Carlos Monsiváis Award for the best social science article in 2018, from the Sexuality Studies Section of the Latin American Studies Association
- 2019 Sarah Shorten Award, from the Canadian Association of University Teachers
