= Mary M. Lepper =

American political scientist

- Born: 1929 or 1930
- Died: June 1984; Oakland, California
- Education: Florida State University
- Scientific career
- Fields: Political science
- Workplaces: California State University, Fullerton; Colorado State University–Pueblo; United States Department of Health and Human Services; Maxwell School of Citizenship and Public Affairs
- Doctoral advisor: Marian Irish

Mary Milling Lepper (died June 1984) was an American political scientist and scholar of public administration. Her research focused on international relations and policymaking. She specialized in bridging academic research and governmental policy work, working both as a professor at a number of academic institutions and in leadership and public administration roles in US government institutions.

== Life and career ==
Lepper completed a PhD in 1966 at Florida State University, where her dissertation advisor was Marian Irish. In 1965 Lepper became a professor in the Department of Political Science in California State University, Fullerton, and in 1970 she moved to Colorado State University–Pueblo (then called the University of Southern Colorado). In 1971, she became associate director at the Executive Seminar Center of the U.S. Civil Service Commission. Two years later, Lepper was named director of the Higher Education Division, and special assistant to the director at the Civil Rights Division, of the United States Department of Health and Human Services. While in this position she held several temporary academic positions, and in 1980 she returned to academia fulltime as a professor at the Maxwell School of Citizenship and Public Affairs.

Lepper's PhD dissertation was the basis for her 1971 book Foreign Policy Formulation: A Case Study of the Nuclear Test Ban Treaty of 1963. In her dissertation and in Foreign Policy Formation, Lepper analyzed the aims and interactions of the major lobbying groups involved in the negotiations around the 1963 Partial Nuclear Test Ban Treaty. Lepper's dissertation, and the book she based on it, were some of the first analyses of how new types of novel policies get formulated. Lepper emphasized (and may have been the first to argue) that Non-Governmental Organizations can have two roles with respect to governments that are engaging in policy formation: NGOs can oppose antagonistic governments, which had been widely recognized, but they can also support sympathetic governments to help them pass policies that they consider amenable.

Lepper was President of the western branch of the International Studies Association, and was an editor of the Western Political Quarterly. Lepper was particularly noted for her activities as an advocate for academia in equity in academia. For example, in her capacity editing the journal of the Western Political Science Association, she oversaw a report on the status of women in the discipline of political science. This was connected to equity concerns in her academic research; for example, she researched the history of sexism in decisions by the United States Supreme Court. Lepper was named an Outstanding Educator of America by Phi Kappa Phi in 1972. For a time after her death in June 1984, the Women's Caucus for Political Science awarded a Mary Milling Lepper Memorial Award in her honor.

== Selected works ==
- Foreign Policy Formulation: A Case Study of the Nuclear Test Ban Treaty of 1963 (1971)
- "The Continuing Struggle for Equal Opportunity", The Phi Delta Kappan (1975)
- "The Status of Women in the United States, 1976: Still Looking for Justice and Equity", Public Administration Review (1976)
