= Cullen B. Gosnell =

American political scientist

- Education: Wofford College
- Occupation: Political scientist
- Known for: Founder of the Department of Political Science at Emory University

Cullen B. Gosnell (1893–1964) was an American political scientist. He was the founder and Chair of the Department of Political Science at Emory University from 1933 to 1951.

== Early life ==
Cullen Bryant Gosnell was born on December 14, 1893, near Spartanburg, South Carolina. He graduated from Wofford College with a bachelor's degree in 1916. He went on to receive a master's degree from Vanderbilt University in 1920 and a PhD from Princeton University in 1928.

== Career ==
Gosnell taught at Wake Forest College and Furman University from 1920 to 1927. He founded the Institute of Politics at Furman University in 1924. Five years later, in 1929, he co-founded the Southern Political Science Association and served as its first President. He was re-elected as its president in 1933. He also served as vice-president of the American Political Science Association. Additionally, he was the vice-president of Pi Sigma Alpha, a political science honor society.

Meanwhile, Gosnell joined Emory University in 1927. Two years later, he founded the Institute of Citizenship at Emory. By 1933, he founded the Department of Political Science at Emory University. Gosnell served as its chair until 1951. In 1941, he co-authored a textbook entitled Democracy in America with William M. Muthard and Stanley M. Hastings. A few years later, in 1945, he took a leave of absence from Emory to teach G.I.s in Shrivenham, England.

Gosnell was an advisor on the revision of the Georgia Constitution in 1944. Additionally, he served on the Georgia Agricultural and Development Board, established by Governor Ellis Arnall.

== Personal life ==
Gosnell was married and a Christian.

== Death ==
Gosnell died in 1964.
