= Clarissa Rile Hayward =

American political scientist

- Education: Princeton University; Yale University
- Scientific career
- Fields: Political science
- Workplaces: Washington University in St. Louis; Ohio State University

Clarissa Rile Hayward is an American political scientist and political philosopher, currently a professor in political science at Washington University in St. Louis with affiliations in American culture studies, urban studies, and philosophy. Hayward studies the theory of political power, how political phenomena relate to theories of identity, and urban politics in the United States.

== Early career and education ==
Hayward obtained a BA in politics from Princeton University in 1988, both an MA and an MPhil from Yale University in 1994, and a PhD from Yale University in 1998. In 1999, she became a professor at the Ohio State University, before moving to Washington University in St. Louis in 2007.

== Career ==
Hayward published her first book, De-facing power, in 2000. The book argues that the main conceptions of power in political theory assume that it necessarily consists of one group or individual reducing the capacity of others to act freely, so that it has a sort of "face" by which it can be identified. The book challenges this negative liberty idea of power as a state of domination by one person over another. Instead, Hayward builds on the post-structuralist work of Michel Foucault to argue that social power should be understood as a set or network of boundaries—consisting of patterns like laws, norms, and institutions—which can either constrain or enable action.

Hayward's second book, How Americans Make Race: Stories, Institutions, Spaces, was published in 2013. The book is partly motivated by a paradox in American racial inequality: how to reconcile the empirical reality of racial inequality with the pervasive norms against racism, and more broadly how to explain the tangible material consequences of identities if we understand identities only as cultural narratives that people associate themselves with. Hayward uses the case of residential real estate to illustrate how apparently non-political motivations for this ubiquitous behavior, such as a desire for comfort and security, have origins in stories about racial identity that American culture has historically relied on to ensure that racial categories have material consequences, through tools like neighborhood segregation and the development of exclusive suburbs. These ideas, which have shaped peoples' relationships to physical space, were explicitly rationalized by politicians and developers as those spaces were being developed, and these rationalizations were based on racial identities. This book won the Urban Politics Section of the American Political Science Association's best book award for 2013.

Hayward is a member of the 2020-2024 editorial leadership of the American Political Science Review, which is the most selective political science journal. She is also a past editor of Political Research Quarterly and the Journal of Politics.

Hayward has written several news articles about contemporary American politics in venues like the Washington Post, Jacobin, and The St. Louis American, and has been quoted as an expert in venues like Time.

== Selected works ==
- De-facing Power (2000)
- "The Difference States Make: Democracy, Identity, and the American City", American Political Science Review (2003)
- How Americans Make Race: Stories, Institutions, Spaces (2013)

== Selected honours and awards ==
- 2005-2006 Visiting Member at the Institute for Advanced Study in Princeton, New Jersey
- 2014 Dennis Judd Best Book Award, for the best book published in 2013, from the Urban Politics Section of the American Political Science Association
- 2017-2018 Fellow in Residence, Harvard University
