= Samuel DuBois Cook =

Political scientist and professor (1928–2017)

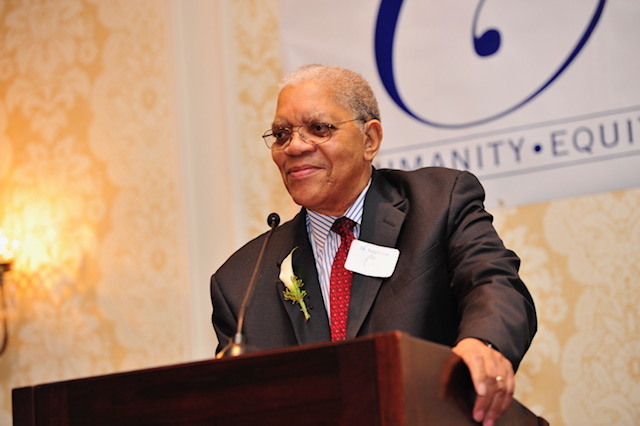
- Born: November 21, 1928; Griffin, Georgia, United States
- Died: May 29, 2017 (aged 88)
- Education: Morehouse College; Ohio State University Ohio State University
- Occupations: Political scientist; Professor; Author; Human rights activist; Civil servant
- Employer: Duke University

Samuel DuBois Cook (November 21, 1928 – May 29, 2017) was a political scientist, professor, author, administrator, human rights activist, and civil servant. He is best known for being the first African-American faculty member at Duke University, in 1966, as well as for serving as president of Dillard University from 1975 to 1997. In addition, Cook was appointed to the National Council on the Humanities by President Jimmy Carter and to the United States Holocaust Memorial Council by President Bill Clinton. Cook also served as the first black president of the Southern Political Science Association.

== Education ==
Cook attended Morehouse College, where he received an A.B. degree. While at Morehouse, he was the founder and student body president of the campuses chapter of the National Association for the Advancement of Colored People (NAACP). He was a member of the Omega Psi Phi fraternity. He also received a M.A. in 1950 and Ph.D. in 1953 from Ohio State University. Cook was a member of the Phi Beta Kappa honor society. He has honorary degrees from Morehouse College, Ohio State University, Dillard University, Illinois College, Duke University, the University of New Orleans and Chicago Theological Seminar.

== Career ==
Cook was a Korean War veteran and an ordained deacon. He began teaching at Southern University and Atlanta University. At Atlanta University, Cook held a chair position in the Political Science Department. Utilizing this position, he participated in the Civil Rights Movement by moderating meetings between activists and students. In 1966, Cook became the first Black professor to hold a regular faculty position at a white southern university when he accepted a position at Duke University. Cook spent 22 years as president of Dillard University in New Orleans, beginning in 1975. While serving as president of Dillard, Cook founded the Center for Black-Jewish Relations.

In 1997, the Samuel DuBois Cook Society was founded in his honor at Duke University.

Cook was a trustee of The King Center in Atlanta, Georgia, from when it was established until his death in 2017.

== Legacy ==
Samuel DuBois Cook is remembered for promoting positive societal change through his analysis of the impact of race in post-World War II southern politics and advancing equality for all American citizens during his time as a scholar and activist. Cook also played a prominent role in promoting a shift in relations between African Americans and Jewish Americans with his establishment of the Center for Black-Jewish Relations while serving as president of Dillard University. He was a friend and classmate of fellow civil rights activist Martin Luther King Jr. Cook was president of the Association for the Study of African American Life and History. He held a chair position of the Presidents of the United Negro College Fund.
