= John Trice Nixon =

American judge (1933–2019)

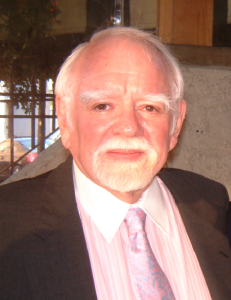

Senior Judge of the United States District Court for the Middle District of Tennessee
- In office August 15, 1998 – December 19, 2019

Chief Judge of the United States District Court for the Middle District of Tennessee
- In office 1991–1998
- Preceded by: Thomas A. Wiseman Jr.
- Succeeded by: Robert L. Echols

Judge of the United States District Court for the Middle District of Tennessee
- In office May 12, 1980 – August 15, 1998
- Appointed by: Jimmy Carter
- Preceded by: Seat established by 92 Stat. 1629
- Succeeded by: Aleta Arthur Trauger

Personal details
- Born: John Trice Nixon; January 9, 1933 New Orleans, Louisiana
- Died: December 19, 2019 (aged 86) Los Angeles, California
- Children: 2, including Mignon Nixon
- Parent: Herman Clarence Nixon (father)
- Education: Harvard College (AB); Vanderbilt University Law School (LLB)

John Trice Nixon (January 9, 1933 – December 19, 2019) was a United States district judge of the United States District Court for the Middle District of Tennessee.

== Early life, education and military service ==
John Trice Nixon was born on January 9, 1933, in New Orleans, Louisiana. His father, Herman Clarence Nixon, was a political scientist at Vanderbilt University and a member of the Southern Agrarians. Nixon graduated from Peabody Demonstration School. He then received an Artium Baccalaureus degree from Harvard College in 1955. He earned a Bachelor of Laws from the Vanderbilt University Law School in 1960.

He served in the United States Army in 1958 for six months, and then in the United States Army Reserves. In September 1963, he was commissioned a second lieutenant while serving with the 405th Civil Affairs Group where he was assigned to the legal section.

== Career ==
Nixon was in private practice as a lawyer in Anniston, Alabama, from 1960 to 1962. He served as city attorney of Anniston from 1962 to 1964. He was a trial attorney of the Civil Rights Division of the United States Department of Justice from 1964 to 1969. He returned to private practice from 1969 to 1971. He then served as a staff attorney of Office of the State Comptroller in Tennessee from 1971 to 1976. Moving to Nashville, Tennessee, in 1976, he practiced law there until 1977. He then served as a judge of the Circuit Court of Tennessee from 1977 to 1978, and as a judge of the Tennessee Court of General Sessions from 1978 to 1980.

== Federal judicial service ==
Nixon was nominated by President Jimmy Carter on February 27, 1980, to the United States District Court for the Middle District of Tennessee, to a new seat created by 92 Stat. 1629. He was confirmed by the United States Senate on May 9, 1980, and received his commission on May 12, 1980. He served as Chief Judge from 1991 to 1998, and assumed senior status on August 15, 1998. He took inactive senior status in 2016, meaning that while he remained a federal judge, he no longer heard cases or participated in the business of the court.

== Personal life ==
Nixon married Betty C. Nixon, later a Nashville city councilor. They had two daughters, Mignon, and Anne, the former who is a professor at University College London (UCL) in London. The Nixons were divorced prior to Mrs. Nixon's death in 2016.

Nixon died on December 19, 2019, in Los Angeles, California.

Legal offices
Preceded by Seat established by 92 Stat. 1629	Judge of the United States District Court for the Middle District of Tennessee; 1980–1998	Succeeded by Aleta Arthur Trauger
Preceded by Thomas A. Wiseman Jr.	Chief Judge of the United States District Court for the Middle District of Tennessee; 1991–1998	Succeeded by Robert L. Echols
