= Gladys Kammerer =

American political scientist

Gladys Marie Kammerer
- Born: 13 May 1909; St. Louis, Missouri, U.S.
- Died: 17 July 1970 (aged 61); Gainesville, Florida, U.S.
- Education: Washington University in St. Louis; University of Wisconsin–Madison; University of Chicago
- Scientific career
- Fields: Political science
- Workplaces: Wellesley College; University of Kentucky; University of Florida

Gladys Marie Kammerer (13 May 1909 – 17 July 1970) was an American political scientist. She was a professor of political science at the University of Florida from 1958 to 1970, where she was the Director of the Public Administration Clearing Service. She was a scholar of public policy, specializing in policy evaluation in the United States at both the local and federal levels. Kammerer was a member of the leadership or advisory councils for a number of national organizations involved in policy implementation and public administration in the United States, as well as several academic societies.

== Life and career ==
Kammerer attended Washington University in St. Louis, where she obtained an A.B. degree, followed by an M.A. degree at the University of Wisconsin–Madison and a PhD in 1946 at the University of Chicago. Kammerer was a professor of political science at Wellesley College, before joining the faculty of the University of Kentucky. She was chosen by the faculty of the University of Kentucky as the Arts & Science Distinguished Professor of the Year for the 1956–1957 school year, and was the first woman to receive this award. In 1957 and 1958, Kammerer was involved in an academic freedom dispute, in which she was denied a pay raise for voicing public criticisms of the administration of the state of Kentucky, and in particular Governor Happy Chandler's handling of the 1952 Youth Authority Act. Numerous faculty members voiced support for Kammerer's freedom to critique the state administration without reprisal from university leadership, and the rift was covered widely in local press, after which Kammerer resigned from the University of Kentucky to take a different position. In 1958, she accepted a faculty appointment in the political science department at the University of Florida, where she remained until 1970. At the University of Florida, she was named Director of the Public Administration Clearing Service. She was the first woman to become a full professor in the department of political science at the University of Florida, and her directorship of the clearing service made her the first woman to have a university-wide leadership role at the University of Florida.

Kammerer's research largely focused on public policy, particularly policy evaluation in the United States. In 1951, Kammerer published a study of how the American federal public service had changed and evolved during World War II, called Impact of war on federal personnel administration: 1939–1945. In 1962 she published British and American child welfare services: A comparative study in administration, a comparison of British and American policy systems. She was also an author on multiple books about city management.

In addition to her research, Kammerer was involved in running many of the major professional organizations in political science. She was the president of the Southern Political Science Association; served terms as the secretary, an executive committee member, and a council member of the American Political Science Association; and was on the national council of the American Society for Public Administration. She also was a member of the national councils of the American Association of University Professors and the National Civil Service Reform League, was an advisory council member for the United States Department of Agriculture, and was appointed by the President of the United States to serve on the national council of the National Heart, Lung, and Blood Institute (then called the National Heart and Lung Institute).

Kammerer died on July 17, 1970. Following her death in 1970, the American Political Science Association established the Gladys M. Kammerer Award in her name, which has been awarded annually for the best publication on the topic of American national policy in the preceding year.

== Selected works ==
Kammerer's works included:

- Impact of war on federal personnel administration: 1939–1945 (1951)
- British and American child welfare services: A comparative study in administration (1962)
- City managers in politics, co-authored (1962)
- The urban political community, co-authored (1963)
