= Peverill Squire =

Peverill Squire is the Hicks and Martha Griffiths Chair in American Political Institutions at the University of Missouri, a political scientist well known for his work on legislative institutions, with specific focus on state legislatures. He has written, or co-authored, over 87 unique publications in the form of article and book chapters. He graduated in 1986 with a Ph.D. from the University of California, Berkeley. Currently he lives in Columbia, Missouri with his wife and dog, Csilla which is Hungarian for star.

== Teaching ==
He has taught at the University of Iowa, Budapest University of Economic Sciences, Meiji University, and University of California, Berkeley. Dr. Squire has taught courses in American Government, Congress and Legislative Policy, Comparative State Politics, American Political Institutions (graduate), Legislative Institutions (graduate), and The Evolution of American Legislatures, 1619 to the Present (graduate)

== Research ==
He is best known for his Squire Index which ranks the levels of professionalization of state legislatures and has been cited over 130 times. Another, less well-known, index of his ranks electoral challenger quality in US House elections and has been cited 60 times.

== Books ==
Include:

- The Rise of the Representative: Lawmakers and Constituents in Colonial America (University of Michigan Press, 2017, ISBN 978-0-472-13039-9)
- The Evolution of American Legislatures: Colonies, Territories, and States, 1619-2009 (University of Michigan Press, 2012, ISBN 978-0-472-11831-1)
