= Rudman (name origin) =

Rudman is a global, multicultural name.

== Origins and meaning ==
The name Rudman has diverse origins, reflecting its multicultural background. It appears in several languages and regions, including Persian, Anglo-Saxon, German, Slovenian, Croatian, and Russian each attributing its own meaning and historical context to the name.

== Persian origin ==
The name Rudman has multiple spellings in Persian, including رادمان and رادمن, with some Persian speakers using the alternative English spelling Radman. The name derives from "راد" (Rad), meaning "noble" or "generous," and "من" (Man), which in Avesta is mentioned as "Manah" (in Sanskrit "Manas") and in Pahlavi "Manitan," meaning "character" or "mindset". Together, it signifies "a man with a noble mindset" or "a man of chivalrous thought". Both variations can be used as a first name or surname in Persian.

The Persian equivalent, رادمان (Radman/Rudman), is found in historical texts dating back over a thousand years. Furthermore, Radman (رادمان پور ماهک | Rādmān pūr-i Māhak) is also believed to be the Persian name of Ya'qub ibn al-Layth al-Saffar, the founder of the Saffarid dynasty of Sistan.

One of the oldest references appears in Shahnameh by Ferdowsi, in the section four of the Khosrow Parviz’s reign:

Original Persian Text

چو گردوی و شاپور و چون اندیان

سپهدار ارمینیه رادمان

نشستند با شاه ایران براز

بزرگان فرزانه رزمساز

Translation

The nobles and wise warriors, such as Gordoy, Shapur, Andian, and the commander of the Armenian army, Rudman, gathered with the King of Iran.

Additionally, the alternative Persian form, رادمن, (Rudman) appears in Maziar, a play by Sadegh Hedayat:

Original Persian Text

مازیار: ...من منتظر رادمن هستم، او را فرستاده ام اخبار عرب ها را برایم بیاورد، آن وقت میتوانم دست به کار بشوم.

Translation

Maziyar: ...I am waiting for Rudman. I have sent him to bring me the news of the Arabs. Then I can take action.

=== Persian pronunciation ===
The pronunciation of Rudman depends on the Persian spelling:

- In Persian, رادمان is pronounced as RAAD-maan (/ɾɒːd.mɒːn/), with a long "a" sound.
- In Persian, رادمن is pronounced as RAAD-man (/ɾɒːd.man/), with a long "a" sound in the first syllable but a slightly different ending compared to رادمان.

== Anglo-Saxon origin ==
The surname Rudman, also recorded as Rudiman and Ruddiman, has Anglo-Scottish origins. It may derive from the Old Celtic and English word rudde meaning "red," combined with mann, meaning "kinsman" or "servant." Alternatively, it could have evolved from the surname Redman.

One theory suggests that Rudman originally referred to a Saxon conqueror who settled among native Celts. The name is documented in historical records dating back to the 12th century in Westmorland, with variations such as Redman, Rydeman, and Rudiman. Notable mentions include William Rudman in Edinburgh (1561) and John Rudman in Yorkshire (1700).

== Rudman in The Dictionary of American Family Names ==
According to The Dictionary of American Family Names, the name Rudman has multiple origins in Germanic, Slovenian, and Croatian traditions. Below are descriptions from this family name dictionary:

1. Americanized form of South German and Swiss German Rudmann: Derived from the ancient Germanic personal name Hrodman or Ruodman (see Rodeman).
2. English Variant of Rodman
  - Occupational name for a thatcher or reed-cutter, from Southwest Middle English rod(e), rud(e) (Old English hrēod) meaning "reed" + -man. Synonymous with Redman.
  - Topographic name for someone who lived at a clearing, from Middle English rode (Old English rodu) or Southwest Middle English rude (Old English rȳde) meaning "clearing" + man.
3. Slovenian and Croatian: Probably a nickname derived from rud meaning "red" or "reddish," or, alternatively, from rud meaning "curly" (standard Slovenian rod), with the suffix -man, a common element of German origin. Alternatively, it may originate from the ancient Germanic personal name Hrodman or Ruodman (see Rodeman).
4. Jewish (Eastern Ashkenazic): A metronymic from the Yiddish female personal name Rude (variant of Rode used in Poland and Ukraine; see Rodman) + Yiddish man, meaning "husband."
