= Matt DeHart =

Former U.S. intelligence analyst and sex offender

Matt Paul DeHart
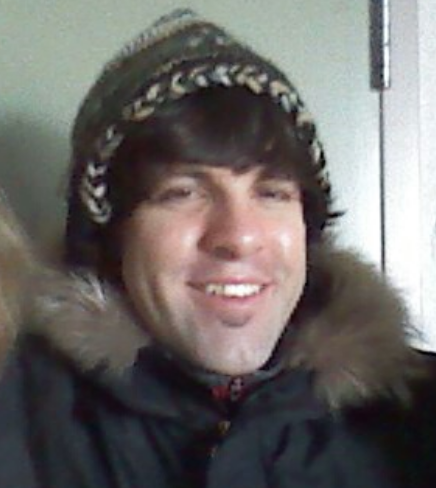
- Matt DeHart in Canada c. 2014
- Born: June 11, 1984 (age 42)
- Occupation: Former intelligence analyst
- Years active: 2008-2009
- Criminal charges: Receiving child pornography. 2 Counts of Possession of Child Sexual Abuse Images (Victim U18). Failing to appear as ordered in court
- Criminal penalty: 72 months for the porn charges plus 18 months for fleeing the country.

Matt Paul DeHart (born June 11, 1984) is an American citizen and former U.S. Air National Guard intelligence analyst and a registered sex offender. He has made several unconfirmed claims, including that he received classified documents alleging the CIA was involved in the 2001 anthrax attacks in the United States and that the government used child pornography charges to frame him for possession of state secrets.

In 2010, he was indicted for possession of child pornography and spent 21 months in prison while awaiting trial. After being released on bail in 2012, he unsuccessfully sought asylum in Canada, claiming he had been tortured by the FBI with regards to the classified documents. In November 2015 he struck a plea bargain to serve a 7 1/2-year sentence. He was released from prison in October 2019.

== Early life and education ==
From an early age, DeHart was a tech geek. He started a group called KAOS (Kaos Anti-Security Operations Syndicate) in 2000. He graduated from high school in 2002. He took classes through Corning Community College; BOCES, Horseheads New York; and IVY Tech Indianapolis, Indiana. In 2004, he spent time on 4chan, a message board which gave birth to Anonymous. Besides socializing and gaming online, DeHart developed interests in encryption, internet freedom and privacy. In 2008, he took part in Project Chanology, Anonymous' anti-Scientology campaign.

== Career ==
In 2008, DeHart enlisted in the U.S. Air National Guard, becoming an intelligence analyst. In June 2009, he was discharged from the National Guard, with an honorable discharge, as a consequence of a diagnosis of depression. DeHart says after his superiors had learned about his activism he had been offered a lump sum if he resigned but he had refused to do so.

== Timeline of events ==
=== Receipt of documents ===
DeHart was involved in online activities with a small group 'Anonymous Anti-Security' using the anonymity network Tor. As a part of these activities, DeHart ran a dead drop server named 'The Shell', on a computer in his bedroom. In September 2009, while monitoring the server, DeHart claims to have found an unencrypted folder containing hundreds of documents, including one detailing what looked like an FBI investigation into some particularly shady deeds by the CIA. He deleted the unencrypted folder from the server, but claims to have kept screenshots. Shortly afterwards he claims to have found an encrypted version of the same file placed on another hidden server he believes was meant for WikiLeaks.

DeHart claimed the "document dropped onto his Tor server included details of FBI's investigation into CIA's possible role in the anthrax attack". DeHart said the CIA staged the attacks to draw the US into a war with Iraq.

On January 22, 2010, DeHart claims to have received a 'pretty detailed tip' from an associate who claims they were asked about the server by the FBI related to the file from a few months previously. At this point, he shut down his server entirely and claims to have destroyed its hard drives.

=== Initial charges and indictment ===
On August 9, 2010, DeHart was brought before U.S. Magistrate Judge Margaret Kravchuk and charged with coercing two teenage boys in Tennessee into sending him nude photos and videos they made of themselves at his request, and that he impersonated a teenage girl in order to acquire sexual images from other underage boys. On August 18, 2010, DeHart signed consent forms (such as the permission for any FBI agent and "any Canadian law enforcement", to record his phone calls with his old military colleagues) and authorized agents to assume his online identity, giving the FBI his aliases, and passwords to his e-mail accounts. Among the accounts was a Hushmail account in the name of "Fawkes".

DeHart was then transferred to Tennessee, where he spent 21 months in jail because of the child pornography charges against him.

After an unsuccessful attempt to seek asylum in Canada, he was deported to the US on March 1, 2015, and handed over to FBI agents at the Peace Bridge border crossing.

=== Plea and sentence ===
DeHart was described by one prosecutor as a "classic child sex predator".

In March 2015, he was granted assistance by the Courage Foundation, an international organization that defends whistleblowers.

On November 13, 2015, in Tennessee, DeHart pleaded guilty to "two charges of receiving child pornography and a charge of failing to appear as ordered in court". On February 22, 2016, U.S. District Court Judge Aleta Arthur Trauger of the United States District Court for the Middle District of Tennessee sentenced DeHart to 72 months for the porn charges and an additional 18 months for fleeing the country. According to DeHart, he was originally scheduled to be released September 11, 2018, taking into account the 14 months he had spent under house arrest in Canada; this part of his plea deal was not honored, and he was eventually released from prison in October 2019.

DeHart has claimed wrongful prosecution, accusing the U.S. government of using child pornography as a ruse to probe his activist activities. A victim-impact statement was delivered which accused DeHart of orchestrating a hoax in the media and in court to avoid taking responsibility for damaging lives.

In 2017, his mother stated that he would "be on a sex offender's registry for 10 years". Although his conviction is in Tennessee, because his last known address was in Concord, New Hampshire, he was also required to register there as a sex offender, with a mugshot dated June 14, 2021.

== See also ==
- Canadian immigration and refugee law
- Sonia Kennebeck (director) (2020). Enemies of the State. – a documentary film about the Matt DeHart case
