= Erika Fairchild =

American political scientist (1931–1992)

- Born: Erika Schmide; July 14, 1931; New York City, U.S.
- Died: November 25, 1992 (aged 61); Raleigh, North Carolina, U.S.
- Education: Hunter College; Yale University; University of Washington
- Scientific career
- Fields: Political science
- Workplaces: United States Department of Health, Education, and Welfare; Meredith College; North Carolina State University

Erika S. Fairchild (July 14, 1931 – November 25, 1992) was an American political scientist. She was professor of political science and public administration at North Carolina State University, where she was also the Associate Dean of the College of Humanities. Her research focused on comparative criminal justice and law enforcement systems.

== Life and career ==
Fairchild was born in New York City on July 14, 1931. She studied at Hunter College, graduating in 1953. She then attended Yale University, where she obtained an MA degree in political science in 1955. From 1955 to 1960, Fairchild worked as a financial analyst at the United States Department of Health, Education, and Welfare. In 1968 Fairchild began a PhD in political science at the University of Washington, which she completed in 1974. Her PhD dissertation was entitled Crime and Politics: A Study in Three Prisons.

In 1972, Fairchild began teaching at Meredith College. In 1976, she became a professor of political science at North Carolina State University. She conducted research mainly on comparative criminal justice and law enforcement systems. She did extensive fieldwork on the German police forces, which led to a book published in 1988. She authored and co-edited multiple other books on the topic, including authoring Comparative Criminal Justice Systems, which was published in 1993. The book compared the law enforcement structures in England, France, Germany, the Soviet Union, Japan, and Saudi Arabia.

Fairchild was elected president of the Women's Caucus for Political Science-South for a one-year term in 1990.

Fairchild had three children. She died aged 61 on November 25, 1992.

== Legacy ==
North Carolina State University established the Erika Fairchild Symposium in Fairchild's honour, and also created a student financial award named for her. There is also an Erika Fairchild Award given by the Women's Caucus for Political Science.

== Selected works ==
- German Police: Ideals and Reality in the Post-War Years (1988)
- Comparative Criminal Justice Systems (1993)
