= David W. Rohde =

American political scientist (1944–2026)

- Born: June 4, 1944; Buffalo, New York, US
- Died: June 20, 2026 (aged 82); Durham, North Carolina, US
- Education: Canisius College; University of Rochester
- Known for: Research on politics in the United States
- Spouse: Yes
- Children: 2
- Awards: Samuel Eldersveld Career Achievement Award from the Political Organizations and Parties Section of the American Political Science Association (2010)
- Scientific career
- Fields: Political science
- Workplaces: Michigan State University; Duke University
- Thesis: Strategy and ideology: the assignment of majority opinions in the United States Supreme Court (1971)

David William Rohde (June 4, 1944 – 20 June 2026) was an American political scientist and the Ernestine Friedl Professor of Political Science in the Trinity College of Arts and Sciences at Duke University. He has researched various aspects of American politics, including the Supreme Court and Congress. Before joining the faculty at Duke, he taught at Michigan State University (MSU) from 1970 to 2005. At MSU, he started the program "Political Institutions and Public Choice", which focused on encouraging collaborative research between faculty members and students. He started the same program at Duke when he joined their faculty in July 2005. He was the editor-in-chief of the American Journal of Political Science from 1988 to 1990.

== Honors and awards ==
In 2000, Rohde was elected to the American Academy of Arts and Sciences. In 2010, he received the Samuel Eldersveld Career Achievement Award from the Political Organizations and Parties Section of the American Political Science Association.

== Death ==
Rohde died on June 20, 2026, of complications from pancreatic cancer.
