= Eugene Borgida =

American political psychologist

Eugene Borgida is an American social and political psychologist.

Borgida graduated from Wesleyan University in 1971, and earned his doctorate at the University of Michigan in 1976. Upon completing his Ph.D., Borgida began teaching at the University of Minnesota, where he was appointed Morse-Alumni Distinguished Professor of Psychology in 1996, and served as Fesler-Lampert Chair in Urban and Regional Affairs between 2002 and 2003. Borgida is a fellow of the American Psychological Association, Association for Psychological Science and American Association for the Advancement of Science.
