= American Political Science Review =

Academic journal

- Discipline: Political science
- Language: English

Publication details
- History: 1906–present
- Publisher: Cambridge University Press on behalf of the American Political Science Association (United States)
- Frequency: Quarterly
- Impact factor: 3.316 (2016)

Standard abbreviations
- ISO 4: Am. Political Sci. Rev.

Indexing
- ISSN: 0003-0554 (print); 1537-5943 (web)
- LCCN: 08009025
- JSTOR: 00030554
- OCLC no.: 805068983

Links
- Journal homepage; Online access; Online archive; Journal page at publisher's website

The American Political Science Review (APSR) is a quarterly peer-reviewed academic journal covering all areas of political science. It is an official journal of the American Political Science Association and is published on their behalf by Cambridge University Press. APSR was established in 1906 and is the flagship journal in political science.

== Abstracting and indexing ==
The journal is abstracted and indexed in the Social Sciences Citation Index, Current Contents / Social & Behavioral Sciences, International Bibliography of Periodical Literature, and the International Bibliography of Periodical Literature. According to the Journal Citation Reports, the journal has a 2016 impact factor of 3.316, ranking it 5th out of 165 journals in the category "Political Science".

== Editorial team ==
The first three managing editors were W. W. Willoughby (1906–1916), John A. Fairlie (1917–1925), and Frederic A. Ogg (1926–1949).

For the 2020–2024 term, the journal is co-led by a 12-member editorial team of Sharon Wright Austin, Michelle Dion, Celeste Montoya, Clarissa Rile Hayward, Kelly Kadera, Julie Novkov, Valeria Sinclair-Chapman, Dara Strolovitch, Aili M. Tripp, Denise Walsh, S. Laurel Weldon, and Elisabeth Jean Wood. This team's term will last until May 2024. The editorial team noted in a publication of the American Political Science Association that, while many journals have had all-male editorial teams, many fewer political science journals have had all-woman teams.

This team follows a 2016–2020 editorial team that had been primarily based in Europe, in an attempt to globalize the reach of the American Political Science Review.

== See also ==
- List of political science journals
