= Randolph (given name) =

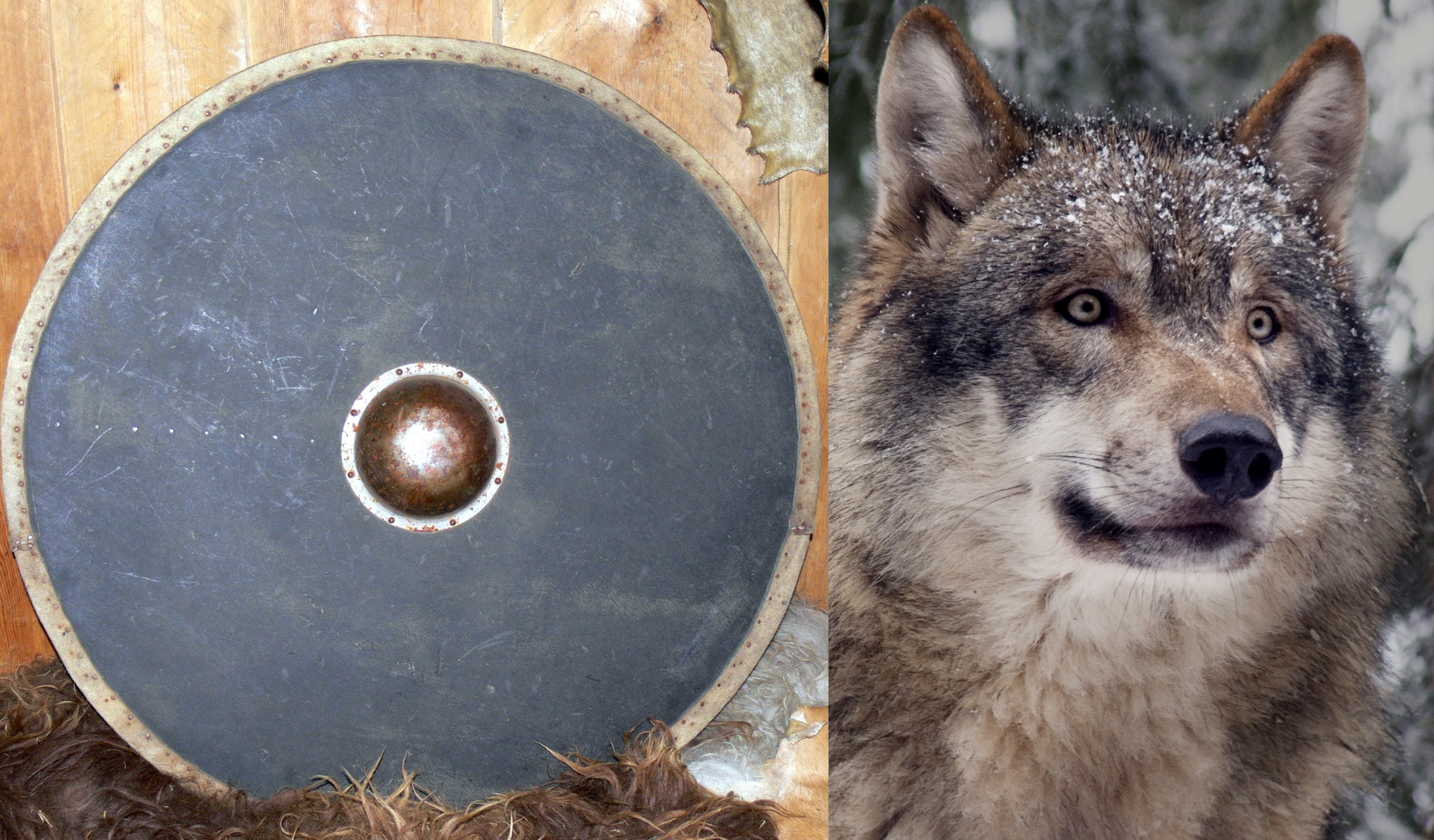
- Randolph is derived from a mediaeval name composed of two elements: "shield" or "rim" + "wolf".
- Gender: Masculine
- Language: English

Origin
- Meaning: Shield Wolf

Other names
- Cognates: Randolf, Randulf, Randulph
- See also: Randy, Randall

Randolph is a masculine given name in the English language. The name is derived from the Old Norse Rannúlfr which is composed of two elements: "shield" or "rim" + "wolf". Cognates of the name include Randolf, Randulph, and Wandolfin. A pet form of Randolf is Randy.

People with the given name include:

== A-F ==
- Randolph Greenfield Adams (1892–1951), American librarian and historian
- Randolph Alles (born 1954), American law enforcement officer and government official
- Randolph Aston (1869–1930), English rugby union centre
- Randolph Barlow (c. 1572–1638), Anglican archbishop
- Randolph A. Beales (born 1960), Attorney General of Virginia and judge of the Virginia Court of Appeals
- Randolph Beazer (fl. 2000s), Barbudan politician
- Randolph Bedford (1868–1941), Australian writer and politician
- Randolph M. Bell (born 1947), American diplomat
- Randolph C. Berkeley (1875–1960), U.S. Marine Corps major general
- Randolph Blackwell (1927–1981), American civil rights activist
- Randolph Blake (born 1945), American psychologist
- Randolph Bourne (1886–1918), American progressive writer and intellectual
- Randolph Bowe (1918–2016), American Negro league baseball pitcher
- Randolph Bracy (born 1977), American politician
- Randolph L. Braham (1922–2018), American historian and political scientist
- Randolph Bresnik (born 1967) U.S. Marine Corps officer and NASA astronaut
- Randolph Bromery (1926–2013), American educator and geologist
- Randolph Bryant (1893–1951), judge of the United States District Court for the Eastern District of Texas
- Randolph Burton (born 1987), Antiguan footballer
- Randolph Caldecott (1846–1886), British artist and illustrator
- Randolph Roque Calvo (born 1950), America prelate of the Roman Catholic Church
- Randolph Carpenter (1894–1956), U.S. Representative from Kansas
- Randolph Carter, fictional character present in H. P. Lovecraft's Cthulhu Mythos
- Randolph Childress (born 1972), American basketball player
- Randolph Chitwood (fl. 1970s–2010s), American surgeon
- Lord Randolph Churchill (1849–1895), British statesman
- Randolph Churchill (1911–1968), British politician
- Randolph Claiborne (1906–1986), bishop of the Episcopal Diocese of Atlanta
- Randolph Cohen (fl. 1990s–2020s), American financial economist
- Randolph Coleman (born 1937), American composer and educator
- Randolph Collier (1902–1983), member of the California State Senate
- Randolph Colville (1942–2004), Scottish jazz swing clarinettist, saxophonist, bandleader and arranger
- Randolph Crew (cartographer) (1631–1657), English amateur cartographer
- Randolph George Croome (1884–1956), Canadian railway conductor and politician
- Randolph Crossley (1904–2004), member of the Hawaii House of Representatives and the Hawaii Senate
- Randolph De Battista (born 1987), Maltese progressive politician
- Randolph Osborne Douglas (1895–1956), British silversmith, artist, and amateur escapologist
- Randolph Fields (1952–1997), Anglo-American lawyer who founded British Atlantic Airways
- Randolph Frank Ollive Foote (1853–1931), British Royal Navy officer
- Randolph Foster (athlete) (born 1968), Costa Rican sprinter
- Randolph Sinks Foster (1820–1903), American bishop of the Methodist Episcopal Church

== F-M ==
- Randolph Galloway (1896–1964), English footballer and football manager
- Randolph George (1924–2016), Bishop of Guyana
- Randolph Glasgow (born 1962), Trinidadian cricketer
- Randolph Gohi (born 1969), French footballer
- Randolph Guggenheimer (1907–1999), American lawyer and philanthropist
- Randolph Guggenheimer (politician) (1846–1907), New York City politician
- Randolph H. Guthrie (1905–1989), American lawyer and businessman
- Randolph Harding (1914–1996), Canadian politician
- Randolph Edgar Haugan (1902–1985), American writer, editor, and publisher
- Randolph Healy (born 1956), Irish poet and publisher
- Randolph Apperson Hearst (1915–2000), American newspaper publisher
- William Randolph Hearst (1863–1951), American businessman, newspaper publisher, and politician known for developing the nation's largest newspaper chain and media company, Hearst Communications
- Randolph T. Hester (fl. 1970s–2010s), landscape architect and professor of landscape architecture
- Randolph Hewton (1888–1960), Canadian artist
- Randolph Hezekiah (born 1936), Trinidadian cricketer
- Randolph Hodgson (1870–1952), English Anglican vicar and writer
- Randolph Hokanson (1915–2018), American pianist and professor
- Randolph M. Holder (1918–1942), United States Navy officer killed in the Battle of Midway
- Randolph Hollerith (born 1963), American Episcopal priest
- Randolph Jackson (born 1943), attorney, author and justice of the New York Supreme Court
- Randolph Jefferson (1755–1815), younger brother of Thomas Jefferson
- Randolph Jenkins (1925–1978), Irish footballer
- Randolph Jerome (born 1978), Guyanese soccer player
- Randolph Jewett (1602/3–1675), English organist and composer
- Randolph K. Jones (1840–1899), Canadian lawyer and political figure
- Randolph Keys (born 1966), American basketball player
- Randolph Kirkpatrick (1863–1950), British spongiologist, cnidariologist and bryozoologist
- Randolph Lycett (1886–1935), British tennis player
- Randolph M. Medley (1898–1979), American football, basketball, and baseball coach and college athletics administrator
- Randolph Mahaffey (born 1945), American basketball player
- Randolph Mainwaring (1839–1902), English cricketer
- Randolph Mank (born 1954), Canadian business executive and diplomat
- Randolph Manning (1804–1864), American jurist and politician
- Randolph Mantooth (1945–2026), American actor
- Randolph B. Marcy (1812–1887), U.S. Army officer before, during, and after the American Civil War
- Randolph B. Martine (1844–1895), American lawyer and politician
- Randolph Jewell Francis Mendis, Sri Lankan Sinhala educationist, first indigenous Commander of the Ceylon Defence Force
- Randolph McCoy (1825–1914), patriarch of the McCoy clan in the infamous American Hatfield–McCoy feud
- Randolph Harrison McKim (1842–1920), American Episcopal clergy and writer
- Randolph McKinnon (1917–2006), Canadian provincial politician
- Randolph Miller (1829/30–1916), African-American freed slave, journalist, and activist
- Randolph Morris (born 1986), American basketball player
- Randolph Moss (born 1961), judge of the United States District Court for the District of Columbia
- Randolph Mott (1799–1881), American businessman and Union sympathizer
- Randolph Murdaugh Sr. (1887–1940), American attorney, and politician, and circuit solicitor of South Carolina
- Randolph Murdaugh Jr. (1915–1998), American attorney who served as the circuit solicitor of South Carolina
- Randolph Murdaugh III (1939–2021), American attorney who served as the circuit solicitor of South Carolina

== N-Z ==
- Randolph Nesbitt (1867–1956), South African-born Rhodesian recipient of the Victoria Cross
- Randolph M. Nesse (born 1948), American physician, scientist and author in the field of evolutionary medicine
- Randolph Nott (1826–1916), Australian politician
- Randolph Oduber (born 1989), Aruban baseball outfielder
- Randolph Greene Pack (1890–1956), American philanthropist
- Randolph Severn Parker III (Trey Parker), one of the creators of the animated series South Park
- Randolph M. Pate (1898–1961), United States Marine Corps general
- Randolph E. Paul (1890–1956), American lawyer
- Randolph Perkins (1871–1936), American politician
- Randolph Peters (born 1959), Canadian composer
- Randolph W. Peterson (born 1953), American attorney, politician, and jurist
- Randolph Powell (born 1950), American actor
- Randolph Prim (1896–1986), Negro league baseball player
- Randolph M. Probstfield (1832–1911), settlers in Clay County, Minnesota
- Randolph Quirk (1920–2017), British linguist and life peer
- Randolph Ramnarace (born 1941), Guyanese first-class cricketer
- Randolph Ridling (1888–1975), New Zealand soldier
- Randolph Roberts (b. 1947), American actor
- Randolph Rogers (1825–1892), American Neoclassical sculptor
- Randolph Rose (1901–1989), New Zealand athlete
- Randolph Ross (born 2001), American athlete specializing in the 400 metres
- Randolph Isham Routh (1782–1858), British Army officer
- Randolph H. Runden (1897–1964), American farmer and politician
- Randolph Runnels (born 1827), American soldier and lawman
- Randolph Schwabe (1885–1948). British draughtsman, painter, and etcher
- Randolph Scott (1898–1987), American actor
- Randolph L. Speight (1919–1999), American jurist and director of the Pioneer Fund
- Randolph Staudenraus (fl. 2010s–2020s), United States Air Force major general
- Randolph Stewart (disambiguation), various people
- Randolph Stone (1890–1981), Austrian-American chiropractor, osteopath and naturopath
- Randolph Stow (1935–2010), Australian-born writer, novelist, and poet
- Randolph Isham Stow (1828–1878), English-born Australian judge of the Supreme Court of South Australia
- Randolph Strickland (1823–1880), American politician
- Randolph Sutton (1888–1969), English singer and comic entertainer
- Randolph Thomas (born 1948), Church in Wales priest who served as Archdeacon of Brecon
- Randolph W. Thrower (1913–2014), American attorney and government official
- Randolph Thummel (fl. 1960s–2020s), American chemist specializing in organic and inorganic chemistry
- Randolph Ting (born 1965), Filipino politician
- Randolph Toms (born 1948), Viking
- Randolph Toussaint (born 1955), Guyanese cyclist
- Randolph Townsend (born 1947), American politician
- Randolph Turpin (1928–1966), British boxer
- Randolph Vigne (1928–2016), South African anti-apartheid activist
- Randolph Want (1811–1869), English-born Australian politician
- Randolph W. Washington (born c. 1852), American teacher and state legislator in Florida
- Randolph Weatherbee (1907–1976), justice of the Maine Supreme Judicial Court
- Randolph Henry Weber (1909–1961), judge of the United States District Court for the Eastern District of Missouri
- Randolph Wemyss (1858–1908), Laird of Wemyss Castle and Chief of Clan Wemyss
- Randolph Lewis White (1896–1991), African-American newspaper publisher, hospital administrator, and civil-rights activist
- Randolph Whitfield Jr. (born 1938), American ophthalmologist
- Randolph Wise (1925–1999), Dean of Peterborough in the Church of England
- Randolph Woolridge (1956–2009), Australian first-class cricket umpire
- Randolph Zane (1887–1918), U.S. Marine Corps officer in World War I

== Namesakes of historic houses ==
- Randolph Bainbridge, of the Randolph Bainbridge House
- Randolph Columbus Barrett, of the Randolph Columbus Barrett House
- Randolph James, of the Randolph James House
- Randolph Mitchell, of the Randolph Mitchell House

== See also ==
- Randolph (disambiguation)
- Randolph (surname)
- Randall (given name)
- Randulf
- Rudolph (name)
