= Randolph =

Randolph may refer to:

== Places ==
=== In the United States ===
- Randolph, Alabama, an unincorporated community
- Randolph, Arizona, a populated place
- Randolph, California, a village merged into the city of Brea
- Randolph, Illinois, an unincorporated community
- Randolph, Indiana, an unincorporated community
- Randolph, Iowa, a city
- Randolph, Kansas, a city
- Randolph, Maine, a town and a census-designated place
- Randolph, Massachusetts, a city
- Randolph, Minnesota, a city
- Randolph, Mississippi, an unincorporated community
- Randolph, Missouri, a city
- Randolph, Nebraska, a city
- Randolph, New Hampshire, a town
- Randolph, New Jersey, a township
- Randolph, New York, a town
  - Randolph (CDP), New York
- Randolph, Oregon, an unincorporated community
- Randolph, Pennsylvania, an unincorporated community
- Randolph, South Dakota, an unincorporated community
- Randolph, Tennessee, an unincorporated community
- Randolph, Texas, an unincorporated community
- Randolph, Utah, a town
- Randolph, Vermont, a New England town
  - Randolph (CDP), Vermont, the main village in the town
- Randolph, Virginia, an unincorporated community in Charlotte County
- Randolph, Richmond, Virginia, a historically black middle-class neighborhood of Richmond
- Randolph, Wisconsin, a village
- Randolph (town), Wisconsin
- Randolph Air Force Base, Texas
- Randolph County (disambiguation)
- Randolph Township (disambiguation)
- Fort Randolph (disambiguation)

=== Elsewhere ===
- Randolph, Manitoba, Canada, a small community
- Fort Randolph (Panama), a Coast Artillery Corps fort guarding the Panama Canal
- Randolph Avenue, a street in London, England

== People ==
- Randolph (given name)
- Randolph (surname)
- Randolph family of Virginia

== Ships ==
- Randolph (ship), a merchant ship that carried settlers to Christchurch, New Zealand
- USS Randolph, two ships of the United States Navy

== Hotels ==
- Randolph Hotel, Oxford, England ("The Randolph")
- Randolph Hotel (Des Moines, Iowa), listed on the National Register of Historic Places in Iowa, also known as the Hotel Randolph
- Randolph Hotel (Chicago), temporary name of the former Bismarck Hotel in Chicago, now Hotel Allegro

== Schools ==
- Randolph College, a private liberal arts and sciences college in Lynchburg, Virginia
- Randolph College for the Performing Arts, a private career college in Toronto, Ontario, Canada
- Randolph School, a college preparatory school in Huntsville, Alabama
- Randolph School (Richmond, Virginia), on the National Register of Historic Places

== Other uses ==
- Randolph Engineering, an American eyewear company
- Randolph Motor Car Company, a defunct American auto manufacturer
- Randolph Road, a county highway in Maryland, United States
- Randolph station (disambiguation), various stations by that name
- Randolph Street, Chicago, Illinois, United States
