= Randall (given name) =

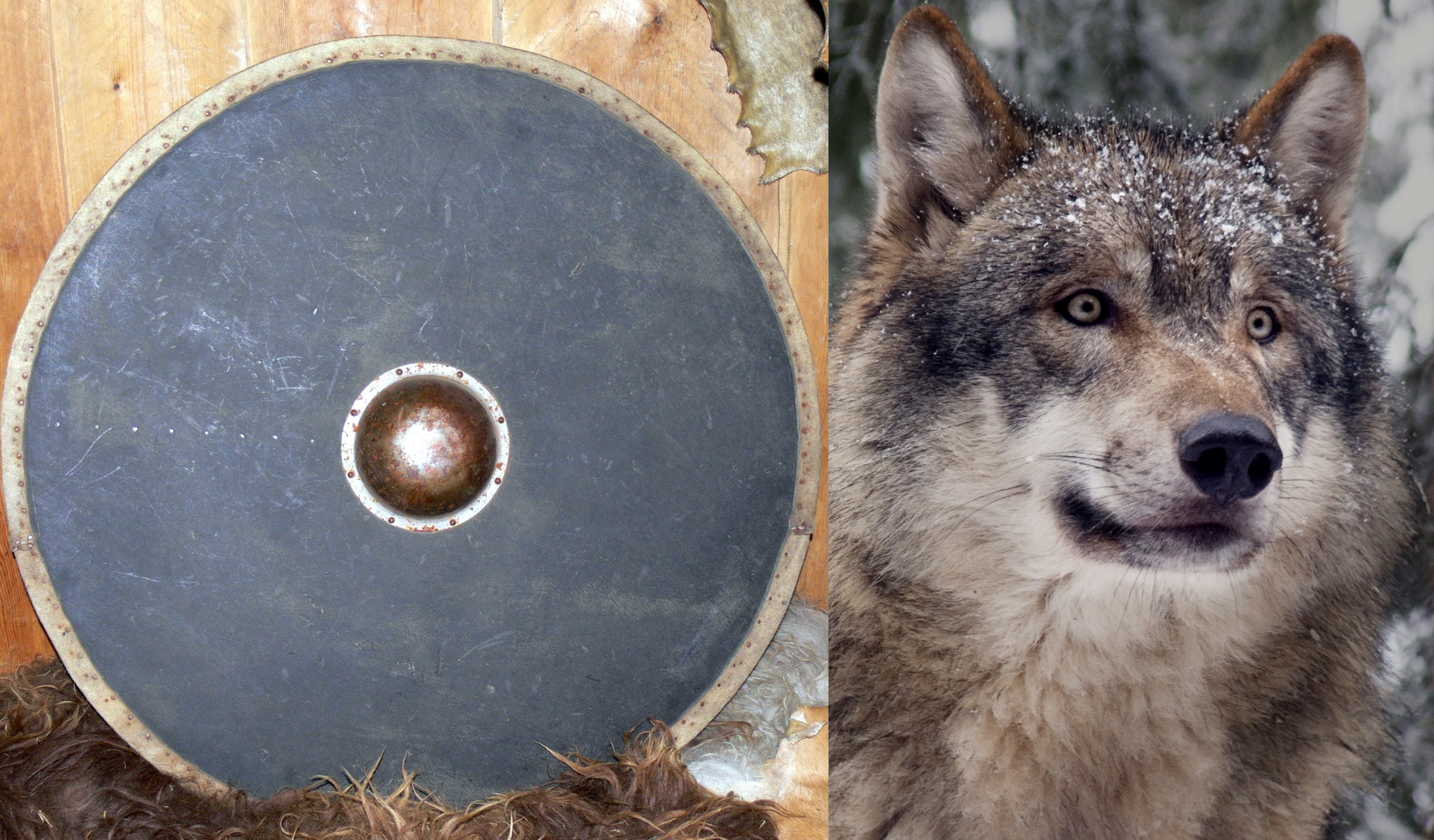
- Randall is derived from a medieval name composed of two elements: "shield" or "rim" + "wolf".
- Pronunciation: /ˈrændl/
- Gender: Masculine
- Language: English

Origin
- Language: English
- Origin: Randall (surname)

Other names
- Alternative spelling: Randal, Randel, Randell, Randle, Rendell, Randoll
- Pet name: Randy
- See also: Raghnall, Rághnall, Rand, Randolf, Randolph, Randulf, Randwulf, Rannulbh, Rannúlfr, Röndúlfr

Randall /ˈrændl/ is a masculine given name in English, Irish and German. Its modern use as a given name originates from the transferred use of the English–language surname Randall, which in turn is derived from Randolph.

There are several variant spellings of the English given name; these include Randal, Randel, Randell, Randle, Randoll, and Rendell. The form Randal has also been used as an Anglicisation of an etymologically unrelated Irish and Scottish Gaelic name, Raghnall. This Anglicisation has been noted as being particularly common amongst several Irish families of note. Randal has not been among the 1,000 most popular masculine baby names in the United States since 1994, and Randall has been among the top 1,000 names since 1906. According to US Census data, in 1990 both names were among the top 500 most popular masculine names in the country. Neither name is currently among the 100 most popular masculine (or feminine) baby names in either the United Kingdom or the Republic of Ireland.

== Etymology and early history ==
The modern given name Randall, /ˈrændl/, is derived from the transferred use of the surname Randall. (Note: There are several variant spellings of this surname. For example the forms: Randell, Randle, Randles, and Randoll.) There have been two explanations for the origin of this surname. One explanation is that the surname is derived from the Middle English personal name Randel. This name is a diminutive of the mediaeval personal name Rand compounded with the Anglo Norman hypocoristic suffix -el. The Middle English Rand can be a short form of any of several names composed of the first element rand, meaning "shield" or "rim"; or the Old Norse short first name Randr (variant form Randi, Old Danish Rand), however the specific names associated with Randel are Randulf and Randolf—names that were brought to England by the Normans. Another explanation for the surname Randall, is that it is merely an apocopal form, or mediaeval vernacular form of Randolf.

The Norman personal names Randulf and Randolf are ultimately derived from the Old Norse Rannúlfr, when the short form Randr (Old Danish Rand) is probably the first part of Norman toponyms such as Randal (Manche, le Vrétot, maybe from *Randdalr, a compound with dalr "valley", same as Randale, hamlet in England), Rantot (Manche, farm at Digulleville maybe from *Randtopt with topt > -tot "toft") and Ranville. In fact, Rannúlfr was introduced into England by Scandinavians well before the arrival of the Norman name, and because of the introduction of the form used by the Normans, both names were reinforced in England. The Old Norse Rannúlfr is composed of two elements—the first element is rand, meaning "shield" or "rim"; the second element is úlfr, meaning "wolf". The Old English form of these names is Randwulf (similarly composed of rand and wulf). Other cognates include: the Old Low German Randwulf, Randulf; and the Old Norse Röndúlfr.

There are several early occurrences in British sources of the names that gave rise to the modern given name Randall. An early occurrence of the modern surname is: Richard Randall, in 1547 (in Huntingdonshire, England). A mediaeval occurrence of the surname is: Thomas Randel, in 1250 (in Suffolk, England). An early occurrence of the short form Rand is: Rande de Borham, in 1299. An early occurrence of Randel (a diminutive of Rand) is: Randal, in 1204 (in Yorkshire, England). An early occurrence of the mediaeval personal names Randolf, Randulf is: Randulfus, in about 1095 (in the Assize Rolls of Yorkshire, England); another is: Nicolaus filius Randulphi, in the years spanning 1175–86 (in Norfolk, England).

According to etymologist P. H. Reaney, the mediaeval name Randulf was commonly confused with Old German Rannulf. This Old German name is composed of elements meaning "raven" and "wolf", and was introduced into England around the same time as Randulf. One example where the unrelated names were confused and given to the same individual in different records is: Randolphus de Brachenberch, in about 1155; and Ranulfus de Brachinberge, in 1160–6 (both names recorded in Lincolnshire, England).

== Variant forms and pet forms ==
Variant spellings of the given name Randall include: Randal, Randel, Randell, Randle, and Rendell. Randal is also used as an Anglicised form of the Irish and Scottish Gaelic Raghnall (to which it is etymologically unrelated). Although Randal is generally Gaelicised as Raghnall in Ireland (and sometimes Rághnall), the Irish Rannulbh more accurately represents Randulph and Randulf. A pet form of Randall is Randy; this name is /ˈrændi/, and is also a pet form of several other etymologically related, and unrelated names.

== Use and popularity ==
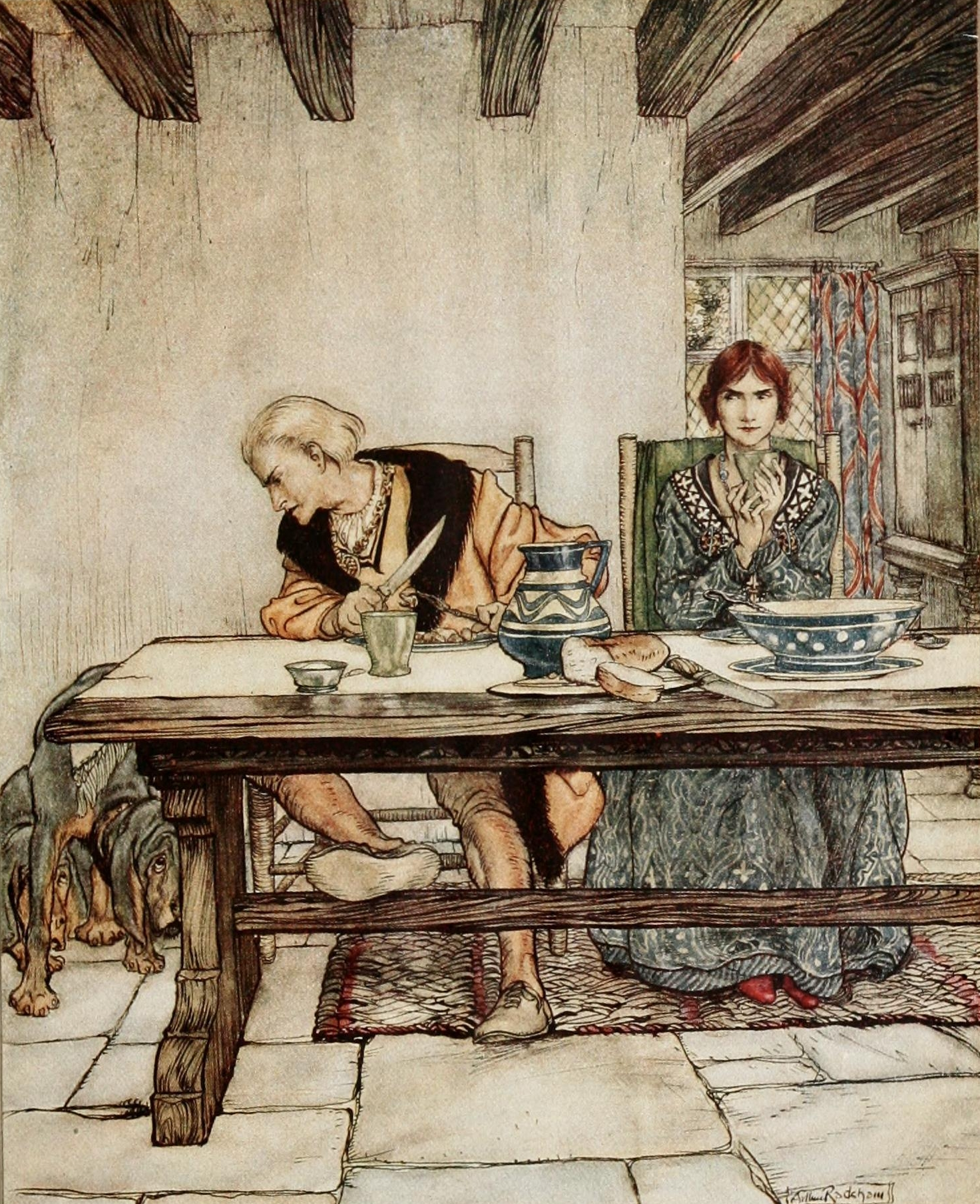
"Lord Randal", by Arthur Rackham, from Some British ballads (published in about 1919). The given name Randal has been associated with this border ballad.

In Scotland, the name Randal has been associated with Lord Randal, an Anglo-Scottish border ballad, published by American Francis James Child in 1882 (see Child Ballads). In parts of Ireland in the 19th and early 20th century, the name Randal has been noted being used particularly by families of the surname MacDonnell (the surname was/is spelt variously). There are several notable Irish families, historically unrelated to each other, who bear (forms of) this surname. The chiefly line of one such family relocated to the Glens of Antrim from Scotland in the 16th and 17th centuries, and Randal appears numerous times in their pedigree; this family descends from members of the Scottish Clan Donald; and even today, various Anglicised forms of the Gaelic Raghnall are commonly used by members of this clan. (Note: For example the present chief of the Macdonalds of Clanranald, the chief of the MacDonells of Glengarry, and the chief of the MacDonalds of Keppoch all have has Ranald as a given name. Although chiefs of the name are no longer recognised in the Republic of Ireland, one MacDonnell who bore the given name Randal was so recognised in the mid-1990s; the present Earl of Antrim, although not a male-line descendant of Clan Donald, also bears this given name. Since the creation of the titles Earl of Antrim and Marquess of Antrim, in the 17th century, there have been numerous earls and marquesseses with Randal as a given name.) Randal was noted in the early 20th century as being common within the O'Donovan family as well; their name, like that of Clan Donald, originated as an Anglicised form of the etymologically unrelated Raghnall.

Since 1906, Randall has been among the top 1,000 names recorded in Social Security card applications for baby boys in the United States. The name was at its most popular point in 1955, when it was ranked the 53rd most popular masculine baby name. Currently, the name was ranked 749th for the year 2009. Randall currently is, and historically has been more popular in the United States than the various other forms of the name. For example, since 1995, Randal has not been among the top 1,000 names recorded in for baby boys. This name first ranked within the top 1,000 boys names in 1938, and it stayed among the top 1,000 names until 1994; the name was at its most popular point in 1958, when it was ranked 189th. According to data released by the Social Security Administration, the forms Randell, Randel, and Randle have never been nearly as popular (see 'popularity graphs' below). In 1990, the United States Census Bureau undertook a study of the 1990 United States census, and released a sample of data concerning the most popular names. According to this sample of 6.3 million people (who had 5,494 unique first names), Randal was ranked as the 477th most popular masculine name, and Randall was ranked 139th most popular. Neither name ranked among females in this sample.

Neither Randal or Randall ranked within the top 100 masculine (or feminine) baby names for the year 2009 in England and Wales; similarly so for Scotland. In both the Republic of Ireland and Northern Ireland, neither name ranked within the top 100 masculine (or feminine) names of registered births in 2009.

=== Popularity graphs ===
Popularity of Randall

Popularity of Randal

The years and rank when Randal and Randall appeared amongst the top 1,000 names for Social Security card applications concerning male births in the United States.

Popularity of Randel

Popularity of Randell

Popularity of Randle

The years and rank when Randel, Randell, and Randle appeared amongst the top 1,000 names for Social Security card applications concerning male births in the United States.

== List of people with the given names ==
=== Randal ===
- Alexander Randal Mark McDonnell (1935–2021), Ninth Earl of Antrim in the Peerage of Ireland
- Randal Bays, American musician
- Randal Beard, American electrical engineer
- Randal Beresford (died 1681), Second Beresford of Coleraine baronet, in the Baronetage of Ireland
- Randal E. Bryant (born 1952), American computer scientist
- Randal Forbes Elliott (1922–2010), New Zealand eye surgeon and campaigner of safety glass
- Randal Haworth, American plastic surgeon
- Randal Hill (born 1969), American football player and politician
- Randal Kleiser (born 1946), American filmmaker
- Randal J. Kirk (born 1954), American lawyer
- Randal Kolo Muani (born 1998), French footballer
- Randal MacDonnell (died 1636), First Earl of Antrim, in the Peerage of Ireland
- Randal MacDonnell (1609–1683), Second Earl of Antrim, and first Marquess of Antrim, in the Peerage of Ireland
- Randal MacDonnell (1680–1721), Fourth Earl of Antrim in the Peerage of Ireland
- Randal Robert Alexander Marlin (1938–2026), Canadian academic
- Randal McLelland (born 1985), American Olympic athlete at the 2008 Summer Olympics
- Randal O'Toole, American city planning commentator
- Randal Keith Orton (born 1980), American professional wrestler
- Randal Pinkett (born 1971), American business consultant
- Randal Edward Sherborne Plunkett (1848–1883), British politician
- Randal Arthur Henry Plunkett (1906–1999), Nineteenth Baron of Dunsany, in the Peerage of Ireland
- Randal Howard Paul (born 1963), American politician
- Randal Smith (1898–1968), Irish peer and banker
- Randal Williams (born 1978), American football player
- Randal Woollatt (1909–1984), English cricketer
- William Randal Cremer (1828–1908), English politician and recipient of the Nobel Peace Prize in 1903
- William Randal McDonnell (1851–1918), Sixth Earl of Antrim, in the Peerage of Ireland

=== Randall ===
- Randall Dale Adams (1948–2010), American man wrongfully convicted of murder and anti-death penalty activist
- Randall Amster (born 1965), American author, activist and educator
- Randall Azofeifa (born 1984), Costa Rican footballer
- Randall B. Griepp (1940–2022), American cardiothoracic surgeon
- Randall B. Kester (1916–2012), American judge
- Randall Bailey (born 1974), American boxer
- Randall Bal (born 1980), American swimmer
- Randall Balmer (born 1954), American historian of religion
- Randall Bass, American academic and English professor
- Randall James Bayer, American botanist
- Randall Batinkoff (born 1968), American actor
- Randall Beer, American roboticist
- Randall C. Berg Jr. (1949–2019), American attorney
- Randall Berry, American electric engineer
- Randall Bewley (1955–2009), American guitarist
- Randall Boe (born 1962), American lawyer
- Randall Bone (born 1973), Australian rules footballer
- Randall Bramblett (born 1948), American musician and singer-songwriter
- Randall Brenes (born 1983), Costa Rican footballer
- Randall Burks (born 1953), American football player
- Randall Carroll (born 1991), American football player
- Randall Cobb (born 1990) American football player
- Randall "Tex" Cobb (born 1950), American boxer and actor
- Randall Collins (born 1941), American sociologist
- Randall Crane, American urban planner
- Randall Cunningham (born 1963), American football player
- Randall David Shughart (1958–1993), United States Army Medal of Honor recipient
- Randall Davidson, 1st Baron Davidson of Lambeth (1848–1930), British, Anglican clergyman, Archbishop of Canterbury
- Randall Dodd, founder and director of Financial Policy Forum
- Randall Dougherty (born 1961), American mathematician
- Randall Duell (1903–1992), American architect
- Randall Duk Kim (born 1943), American actor
- Randall Edwards (born 1955), American actress
- Randall Edwards (born 1961), American politician
- Randall Einhorn (born 1963), American TV director and cinematographer
- Randall Faye (1892–1948), American screenwriter
- Randall K. Filer (born 1952), American economist
- Randall Fine (born 1974), American politician
- Randall Craig Fleischer (1958–2020), American conductor
- Randall Forsberg (1943–2007), American, anti-war activist
- Randall M. Fort (born 1956), American, member of the Intelligence and Research in the United States Department
- Randall Frakes, author
- Randall Franks, American actor, singer and musician
- Randall Garrett (1927–1987), American, author
- Randall Garrison, Canadian politician
- Randall Gay (born 1982), American, American football player
- Randall George Lewis MacAlister, Anglican priest
- Randall L. Gibson,
- Randall Giles (1950–2010), American, music composer
- Randall Godfrey (born 1973), American, American football player
- Randall Goff,
- Randall Goforth (born 1994), American football player
- Randall Greenwood, American politician
- Randall Gregory Holcombe, American, academic
- Randall Hall, American politician
- Randall S. Harmon (1903–1982), American, politician
- Randall G. Hassell, karate instructor
- Randall Hodgkinson, American, musician
- Randall Hyde (born 1956), American, author
- Randall Jahnson, American, writer, director, and producer
- Randall Jarrell (1914–1965), American, author
- Randall Kenan (born 1963), American, author
- Randall Kennedy (born 1954), American, academic and author
- Randall C. Kennedy, computer specialist
- Randall King (born 1950), American-born former professional tennis player
- Randall Kleck, American, martial artist
- Randall Kroszner (born 1962), member of the Federal Reserve
- Randall Luthi (born 1955), American, attorney
- Randall Maggs, Canadian, poet
- Randall Mann, American, poet
- Randall McDaniel (born 1964), American, professional American football player
- Randall Miller, American, film director
- Randall Munroe (born 1984), American, webcomic author
- Randall Nieman, musician
- Randall C. O'Reilly (born 1967), academic
- Randall Park, American, comedian and actor
- Randall Parrish (1858–1923), American, author
- Randall Pinkston (born 1950), correspondent for CBS News
- Randall Ray Rader (born 1949), American, Chief Judge of the United States Court of Appeals for the Federal Circuit
- Randall "Randy" Rhoads (born 1956), American, musician and songwriter.
- Randall "Randy" Roach (born 1951), American mayor
- Randall Robinson (1941–2023), American, lawyer, author, and activist
- Randall Robinson (cinematographer) (born 1946), American, cinematographer
- Randall Rollins (1931–2020), American businessman
- Randall Rothenberg, business executive
- Randall Row (born 1971), Costa Rican, footballer
- Randall Schmidt, American, lieutenant general in the United States Air Force
- Randall Schweller, American, academic
- Randall Silvis, American, author
- Randall Simon (born 1975), professional baseball player
- Randall Smith (disambiguation) - several people
  - Randall Lee Smith (died 2008), American, convicted murderer
- Randall W. Spetman (born 1953), American, athletic director at Florida State University
- Randall J. Stephens, author
- Randall L. Stephenson (born 1960), American, business executive
- Randall S. Street (1780–1841), American, lawyer and politician
- Randall J. Strossen (born 1951), strength training writer
- Randall Stout, American, architect
- Randall Svane (born 1955), American composer
- Randall Swingler (1909–1967), English poet, also awarded the Military Medal in the Second World War
- Randall T. Shepard (born 1946), Chief Justice of the Indiana Supreme Court
- Randall Terry (born 1959), American, anti-abortion activist
- Randall L. Tobias (born 1942), American, business executive
- Randall Thompson (1899–1984), American composer
- Randall Thompson, Canadian boxer
- Randall Wallace (born 1949), American screenwriter, director and producer
- Randall Weber (born 1968), Canadian ice hockey player
- Randall Wells (1877–1942), English architect
- Randall L. Williams (1924–2010), Arkansas politician
- Randall Winston, American television producer and director
- Randall Woodfield (born 1950), American serial killer and rapist dubbed The I-5 Killer or The I-5 Bandit
- Randall Woolf (born 1959), American composer
- Randall Zisk, American television director and producer
- Randall Zwinge (1928–2020), American stage magician and scientific skeptic

=== Randell ===
- Randell Kirsch, American musician

== Fictional characters ==
=== Given name ===
- Randall Boggs, character and the main antagonist in the Monsters, Inc. franchise
- Randall Flagg, character in works by Stephen King
- Randal Graves, character from the View Askewniverse and Clerks, Clerks II, Clerks III, and Clerks: The Animated Series
- Randall Shire, character in the Marvel Comics Universe
- Randall Weems, character from the American animated TV series Recess
- Randle McMurphy, protagonist of Ken Kesey's novel One Flew Over the Cuckoo's Nest and its film adaptation

=== Surname ===
- Hester Randall, character from the Channel 5 soap opera Family Affairs
- Josh Randall, on the American TV series Wanted: Dead or Alive, played by Steve McQueen
- Lucas Randall, on the Canadian TV series Strange Days at Blake Holsey High
- Rex Randall, on the Channel 5 soap opera Family Affairs
- Tex Randall, a 47-foot tall cowboy figure constructed in 1959 in Canyon, Texas
