= VCU Greek Row =

Coordinates: 38.4344°N 78.8758°W

Greek Row
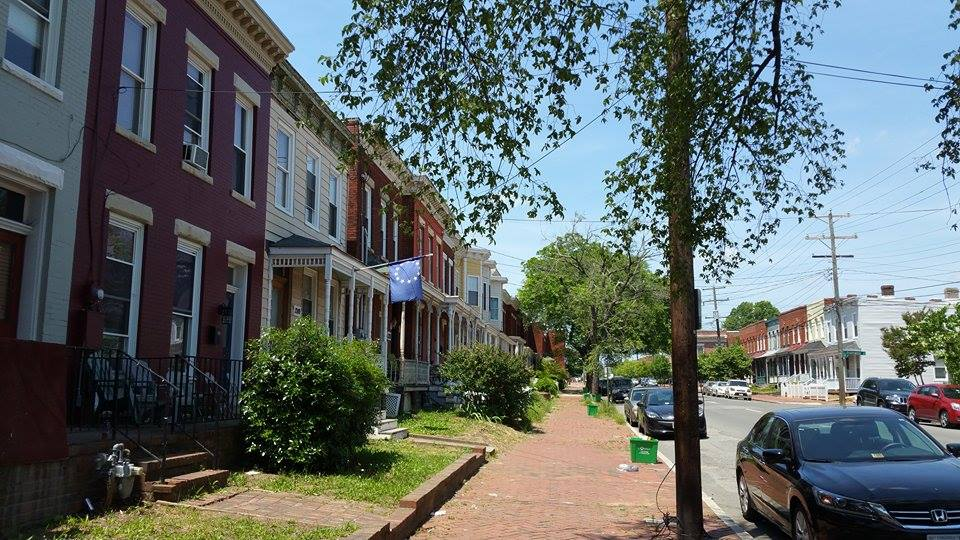
- Interactive map of Greek Row
- Time zone: UTC−04:00 (Eastern Daylight Time)
  - Summer (DST): UTC−05:00 (Eastern Standard Time)
- ZIP code: 23220
- Area code: 804
- ISO 3166 code: 1

The VCU Greek Row is a strip of fraternity sorority houses that are situated along Cary Street in the West End of Richmond, Virginia. It is located along the border of Randolph and "The Fan".

== See also ==
- Virginia Commonwealth University
- Neighborhoods of Richmond, Virginia
