= Albert F. Huntt =

American architect (1869–1920)

- Born: July 12, 1869; Richmond, Virginia, U.S.
- Died: July 14, 1920 (aged 51); Richmond, Virginia, U.S.
- Education: Pennsylvania Military Academy
- Occupation: Architect
- Spouse: Georgiana Bartram Hathaway (m. 1893)
- Children: 2
- Relatives: Otis Manson (great-great grandfather)
- Buildings: American Cigar Company; Atlantic Motor Company; Fairmount School

Albert F. Huntt (July 12, 1869 – July 14, 1920) was an architect in Richmond, Virginia.

== Early life ==
Albert F. Huntt was born in Richmond, Virginia, on July 12, 1869, to Sallie Spotswood (née Manson) and A. L. Huntt. His great-grandfather Otis Manson was an architect who came to Richmond from New England. He studied at Pennsylvania Military Academy in Chester, Pennsylvania.

== Career ==
Huntt designed commercial, industrial and residential buildings including for the American Tobacco Company. Bascom Rowlett often worked with him. Several of his works are listed on the National Register of Historic Places (NRHP).

== Personal life ==
Huntt married Georgiana "Georgie" Bartram Hathaway of Chester in 1893. They had two sons, Albert F. Jr. and Spotswood. He died at his home in Richmond on July 14, 1920.

== Selected works ==
- American Cigar Company (1903), 1148 E. Princess Anne Rd., Norfolk, Virginia (Huntt, Albert F. (attributed to)), NRHP-listed
- Cary Ellis Stern residence (1907) at 1700 Grove Avenue, Richmond, Virginia
- Fairmount School, 1501 N. 21st St. (addition, 1908–1909), Richmond, NRHP-listed
- Lafferty House (1913) on Monument Avenue, Richmond
- Sorg House (1914) on Monument Avenue, Richmond, for the vice president of the Millhiser Bag Company
- Atlantic Motor Company (1919), Richmond, auto showroom building, NRHP-listed, the last work by Huntt.
- George house at 1831 Monument Avenue, Richmond
- 2204 Monument Avenue, Richmond
- 2300 Monument Avenue, Richmond
- 2500 Monument Avenue, Richmond
- Kenilworth and Stratford Court apartments on Monument Avenue, Richmond
- One or more works in NRHP-listed Fairmount Historic District, roughly bounded by 24th, Y, 20th, T, R, Q & P Sts., Fairfield & Carrington Aves., & Mechanicsville Tpk., Richmond
- One or more works in NRHP-listed West Broad Street Industrial and Commercial Historic District, 1800-2100 blocks of Broad & Marshall Sts., bounded by Allison & Allen Sts., Richmond
