= American Cigar Company =

American Cigar Company may refer to:

- American Cigar Company (Norfolk, Virginia), a set of two former factory buildings on the National Register of Historic Places
- American Cigar Company (Trenton, New Jersey), the company's factory in Trenton, also on the NRHP
