= Decoration of Honour for Services to the Republic of Austria =

Meritorious service award

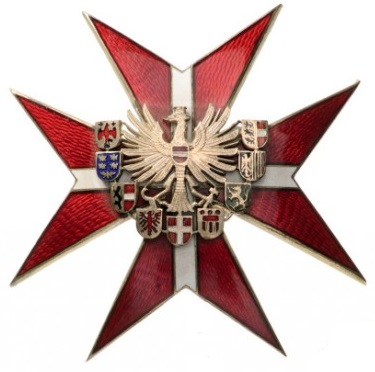
- Grand Decoration of Honour (Großes Ehrenzeichen)
- Type: State decoration
- Awarded for: Meritorious service to the Austrian nation
- Country: Republic of Austria
- Eligibility: Civilians and military personnel
- Established: 4 November 1922; 2 April 1952

Precedence
- Next (higher): None (highest)
- Next (lower): Varies by grade
- Related: Decoration for Science and Art

The Decoration of Honour for Services to the Republic of Austria (German: Ehrenzeichen für Verdienste um die Republik Österreich) is a state decoration of the Republic of Austria. It is divided into 15 classes and is the highest award in the Austrian national honours system.

== History ==
The Decoration of Honour for Services to the Republic of Austria was first established by federal law on 4 November 1922. It initially had ten grades; later, it was expanded to sixteen grades. It was replaced in 1934 by the Austrian Order of Merit.

The modern iteration of the Decoration of Honour for Services to the Republic of Austria was established by the National Council in 1952. It is conferred by the Republic of Austria to honour people (from Austria and abroad) who have rendered meritorious services to the country. Recipients are selected by the government. The awards are made by the President in accordance with the respective laws. The State President of Austria automatically receives the "Grand Star of the Decoration for Services to the Republic of Austria" by being elected to the office and holds this honour for life. This decoration should not be confused with other decorations in the Austrian honours system, such as the Austrian Decoration for Science and Art.

== Classes ==
The Decoration of Honour for Services to the Republic of Austria is divided into 15 classes, as follows:

1. Grand Star (Groß-Stern)
2. Grand Decoration of Honour in Gold with Sash (Großes Goldenes Ehrenzeichen am Bande)
3. Grand Decoration of Honour in Silver with Sash (Großes Silbernes Ehrenzeichen am Bande)
4. Grand Decoration of Honour in Gold with Star (Großes Goldenes Ehrenzeichen mit Stern)
5. Grand Decoration of Honour in Silver with Star (Großes Silbernes Ehrenzeichen mit Stern)
6. Grand Decoration of Honour in Gold (Großes Goldenes Ehrenzeichen)
7. Grand Decoration of Honour in Silver (Großes Silbernes Ehrenzeichen)
8. Grand Decoration of Honour (Großes Ehrenzeichen)
9. Decoration of Honour in Gold (Goldenes Ehrenzeichen)
10. Decoration of Honour in Silver (Silbernes Ehrenzeichen)
11. Decoration of Merit in Gold (Goldenes Verdienstzeichen)
12. Decoration of Merit in Silver (Silbernes Verdienstzeichen)
13. Gold Medal (Goldene Medaille)
14. Silver Medal (Silberne Medaille)
15. Bronze Medal (Bronzene Medaille), no longer awarded

The "Gold Medal for Services to the Republic of Austria" may also be conferred as "Gold Medal with Red Riband" awarded for bravery and lifesaving.

Classes of the decoration
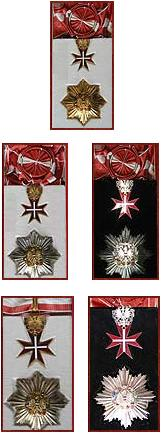
The five higher classes with Breast Star

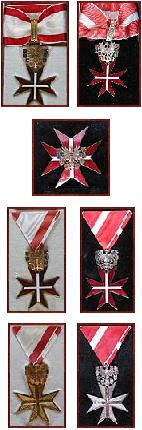
The seven lower classes of the Decoration

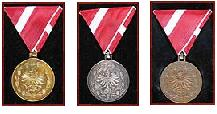
Three Medals in Gold, Silver and Bronze

== Notable recipients ==
Below is a list of all Grand Star recipients and other notable recipients, in chronological order with year of award in parentheses:.

=== Grand Star recipients ===
==== Royal Houses ====
- Pakubowono X, Susuhunan of Surakarta from 1893 to 1939 (1926)
- Hussein bin Talal, King of Jordan from 1952 to 1999 (1976)
- Haile Selassie, Emperor of Ethiopia from 1930 to 1974 (1954)
- Mohammad Reza Pahlavi, Emperor of Iran from 1941 to 1979 (1958)
- Empress Farah, Empress Consort of Iran from 1959 to 1979 (1965)
- Albert II, King of the Belgians from 1993 to 2013, now former King (1958)
- Queen Paola of Belgium, Queen of the Belgians from 1993 to 2013, now former Queen (1997)
- Bhumibol Adulyadej, King of Thailand from 1946 to 2016 (1964)
- Sirikit, Queen of Thailand from 1950 to 2016 (1964)
- Elizabeth II, Queen of the United Kingdom and other Commonwealth Realms from 1952 to 2022 (1966)
- Prince Philip, Duke of Edinburgh consort of Elizabeth II from 1952 to 2021 (1966)
- Olav V, King of Norway from 1957 to 1991 (1966)
- Akihito, Emperor of Japan from 1989 to 2019, now Emperor Emeritus (1999)
- Empress Michiko, Japanese empress consort from 1989 to 2019, now Empress Emerita (1999)
- Qaboos bin Said al Said, Sultan of Oman from 1970 to 2020 (2001)
- Margrethe II of Denmark, Queen of Denmark from 1972 to 2024, now former Queen (1964)
- Carl XVI Gustaf, King of Sweden since 1973 (1967)
- Queen Silvia of Sweden, Queen of Sweden since 1976 (1979)
- Azlan Shah, Sultan of Perak from 1984 to 2014 and Yang di-Pertuan Agong of Malaysia from 1989 to 1994
- Hassan II, King of Morocco from 1961 to 1999
- Harald V, King of Norway since 1991
- Queen Sonja of Norway, Queen of Norway since 1991 (1978)
- Abdullah II, King of Jordan since 1999 (2001)
- Queen Rania of Jordan since 1999 (2001)
- Princess Anne, Princess Royal (1969)
- Hans-Adam II, Prince of Liechtenstein since 1989 (1991)
- Princess Marie, Princess consort of Liechtenstein from 1989 to 2021 (2004)
- Henri, Grand Duke of Luxembourg, Grand Duke of Luxembourg from 2000 to 2025, now former Grand Duke (2013)
- Maria Teresa, Grand Duchess of Luxembourg, from 2000 to 2025, now former Grand Duchess (2013)
- Juan Carlos I, King of Spain from 1975 to 2014 now former King (1978)
- Queen Sofía of Spain, Queen of Spain from 1975 to 2014 now former Queen (1978)
- Haitham bin Tariq, Sultan of Oman, (2001)
- Philippe of Belgium, King of the Belgians since 2013 (2022)
- Willem-Alexander of the Netherlands, King of the Netherlands since 2013 (2022)
- Queen Máxima of the Netherlands, Queen of the Netherlands since 2013 (2022)

==== Politicians ====
- Tassos Papadopoulos, Former President of the Republic of Cyprus from 2003 - 2008
- Adolf Schärf, President of Austria from 1957 to 1965 (1957)
- Franz Jonas, President of Austria from 1965 to 1974 (1965)
- Josip Broz Tito, President of Yugoslavia from 1953 to 1980 (1965)
- Suharto, President of Indonesia from 1968 to 1998 (1973)
- Siti Hartinah, First Lady of Indonesia from 1968 to 1996 (1973)
- Rudolf Kirchschläger, President of Austria from 1974 to 1986 (1974)
- Kurt Waldheim, Secretary-General of the United Nations from 1972 to 1981, and President of Austria from 1986 to 1992 (1974)
- Hans Brunhart, Prime Minister of Liechtenstein from 1978 to 1993
- Thomas Klestil, President of Austria between 1992 and 2004 (1992)
- Alberto Fujimori, President of Peru from 1990 to 2000 (1997)
- Emil Constantinescu, President of Romania from 1996 to 2000 (1999)
- Árpád Göncz, President of Hungary from 1990 to 2000 (1999)
- Konstantinos Stefanopoulos, President of Greece from 1995 to 2005 (1999)
- Petar Stoyanov, President of Bulgaria from 1997 to 2002 (1999)
- Nursultan Nazarbayev, President of Kazakhstan from 1990 to 2019 (2000)
- Stjepan Mesić, President of Yugoslavia in 1991, and President of Croatia from 2000 to 2010 (2001)
- Carlo Azeglio Ciampi, President of Italy from 1999 to 2006 (2002)
- Jorge Sampaio, President of Portugal from 1996 to 2006 (2002)
- Abdelaziz Bouteflika, President of Algeria from 1999 to 2019 (2003)
- Heinz Fischer, President of Austria from 2004 to 2016 (2004)
- Giorgio Napolitano, President of Italy from 2006 to 2015 (2007)
- Jacques Chirac, President of France from 1995 to 2007
- Ferdinand Marcos, President of the Philippines from 1965 to 1986
- Sauli Niinistö, President of Finland from 2012 (2016)
- Alexander Van der Bellen, President of Austria from 2017 to present (2017)
- Christiane Brunner (Austrian politician), member of the Austrian National Council from 2008 to 2017
- Marcelo Rebelo de Sousa, President of Portugal from 2016 (2019)
- Sergio Mattarella, President of Italy from 2015 (2019)
- Kersti Kaljulaid, President of Estonia from 2016 to 2021 (2021)
- Moon Jae-in, President of South Korea from 2017 to 2022 (2021)
- Borut Pahor, President of Slovenia from 2012 to 2022 (2022)
- Miloš Zeman, President of the Czech Republic from 2013 to 2023 (2023)
- Zuzana Čaputová, President of Slovakia from 2019 (2024)
- Roberta Metsola, President of the European Parliament from 2022 (2024)

=== Other select recipients ===
- Ruslan Abdulgani (Grand Decoration of Honour in Gold with Sash, 1956)
- Dimitri Shostakovich (Grand Decoration of Honour in Silver, 1967)
- Robert Fein (1907–1975), Austrian Olympic champion weightlifter
- Willy Brandt, Chancellor of Germany from 1969 to 1974 (Grand Decoration of Honour in Gold with Sash, 1972)
- Anna Freud (1975)
- Hilde Hawlicek (Grand Decoration of Honour in Gold with Sash, 1980)
- Alfred Verdroß-Droßberg (Grand Decoration of Honour in Gold with Star for services to the Republic of Austria, 1980)
- Wolf In der Maur (Grand Decoration of Merit in Gold, 1985)
- Sudharmono (Grand Decoration of Honour in Silver with Sash)
- Ginandjar Kartasasmita (Grand Decoration of Honour in Gold with Star, 1986)
- Feisal Tanjung (Grand Decoration of Honour in Gold, 1996)
- James B. Thayer(Grand Decoration of Honor, 1996)
- Shoichiro Toyoda (Grand Decoration of Honour in Gold with Star, 1999)
- Randolph M. Bell (Grand Decoration of Honour in Silver, 2004)
- Jeanette Schmid (Decoration of Merit in Gold, 2004)
- Stuart Eizenstat (Grand Decoration of Honour in Gold with Star, 2005)
- Andreas Maislinger (Decoration of Honour in Silver, 2005)
- Simon Wiesenthal (Grand Decoration of Honour in Gold for Services to the Republic of Austria, 2005)
- Kofi Annan, Secretary-General of the United Nations from 1997 to 2006 (Grand Decoration in Gold with Sash, 2007)
- Gerhard Rühm, author, composer, and artist (Decoration of Honour in Gold, 2007)
- Atta-ur-Rahman, Pakistani Organic chemist (Decoration of Honour in Gold with Sash for Services to the Republic of Austria, 2008)
- Ertuğrul Günay, Minister of Culture and Tourism of Turkey (Grand Decoration in Gold with Sash, 2010)
- Prince Hassan bin Talal, (Grand Decoration of Honour in Gold with Sash, 2004)
- Christoph Schönborn, Roman Catholic Cardinal and Archbishop of Vienna (Grand Decoration of Honour in Gold with Sash, 2008)
- Miep Gies (2009)
- Hans Dobida, inductee into the IIHF Hall of Fame
- Alois Mock, Vice-Chancellor of Austria from 1987 to 1989 (Grand Decoration of Honour in Gold with Sash)
- Walter Schwimmer (Grand Decoration of Honour in Silver with Star)
- Ruth Wodak (Decoration of Honour in Silver, 2011)
- Elisabeth Bleyleben-Koren
- Joannis Avramidis, painter and sculptor (Grand Decoration of Honour in Gold with Star for Services to the Republic of Austria, 2012)
- Eleonore Schönborn (2013)
- Viatcheslav Moshe Kantor (Grand Decoration of Honour in Gold for Services to the Republic of Austria, 2021)
- Henry Steiner, graphic designer (Decoration of Honour in Gold, 2006)
- Emil Salim, (Grand Decoration of Honour in Silver with Sash)
- Samir Mane, Albanian Entrepreneur and Philanthropist (Grand Decoration of Honor for Services to the Republic of Austria, 2019)
- Avni Ponari, Albanian Entrepreneur (Grand Decoration of Honour, 2019)
- Gustav Mak Ka Lok, composer and conductor (Decoration of Honour in Gold for services to the Republic of Austria, 2022)
- Martin Karplus (Grand Decoration of Honour in Gold with Sash, 2024)
- Aram Novel Marutian, Honorary Consul of Austria in Armenia ( Silver Decoration for Services to the Republic of Austria, 2025)
