= Fort Randolph =

Fort Randolph may refer to:

- Fort Randolph (Pineville, Louisiana), listed on the National Register of Historic Places
- Fort Randolph (Tennessee), a Confederate Civil War fortification in Randolph, Tennessee
- Fort Randolph (West Virginia), a 1785 Revolutionary War fortification at Point Pleasant, West Virginia
- Fort Randolph (Panama), a Coast Artillery Corps fort
