= Randy Smith =

Randy Smith may refer to:

== Sports personalities ==
- Randy Smith (basketball) (1948–2009), American chosen NBA All-Star Game Most Valuable Player in 1978; career lasted 1971–83
- Randy Smith (baseball) (born 1963), American executive; General Manager of San Diego Padres (1993–95) and Detroit Tigers (1996–02)
- Randy Smith (ice hockey), British League Premier Division winner of the Player of the Year trophy for 1994–95 and 1995–96
- Randy Smith (high jumper) (born 1953), winner of the 1974 NCAA DI outdoor high jump championship
- Randy Smith (runner) (born 1952), 2nd in the 1975 NCAA 3000 m steeplechase for the Wichita State Shockers track and field team
- Randy Smith (sprinter) (born 1957), American sprinter, 1977 All-American for the Michigan State Spartans track and field team

== Others ==
- N. Randy Smith (born 1949), American jurist; appointed by President George W. Bush in 2007 to the U.S. Court of Appeals for the Ninth Circuit
- Randy Smith (game designer) (born 1974), American computer game expert who worked on the Thief series for Looking Glass Studios
- Randy Smith (politician) (born 1960), American state legislator in West Virginia
- Randy Smith (Oregon politician), American farmer and member of the Oregon Legislative Assembly during the 1970s

== See also ==
- Randall Smith (disambiguation)
