= Bascom Joseph Rowlett =

American architect (1886–1947)

- Born: 1886; Richmond, Virginia
- Died: 1947 (aged 60–61); Orange, Virginia
- Occupation: Architect
- Buildings: English Village; Atlantic Motor Company (with Albert F. Huntt)

Bascom Joseph Rowlett (1886–1947) was an architect in Richmond, Virginia. He was raised by others after his father, James Bascom Rowlett, who worked at the Tredegar Ironworks died. Rowlett graduated from Richmond High School in 1906 and Virginia Mechanics Institute (a Mechanics' Institutes).

== Career ==
Rowlett worked for Albert Huntt. After Huntt's death, Rowlett worked as a solo practitioner. Business was hit by the Great Depression and Rowlett took on federal government projects including the Warren County Courthouse in Front Royal for the WPA. Rowlett died in 1947 and was buried in Orange, Virginia. His son Bascom Rowlett Jr. attended Virginia Tech and became an engineer.

== Works ==
- Westhaven Apartments on the Boulevard
- Cannon apartment house at 1110 Grove Avenue (1922) Mediterranean architecture
- Rixey Court on Monument Avenue (1924)
- English Village (1926) Tudor Revival architecture style
- Tuscan Villa between Park and Kensington on the Boulevard
- Kensington Avenue apartment houses
- Apartment Houses at 111, 218–220, 103 South Boulevard, 2832 Monument Avenue and 3010-12 Monument
