= Fairmount School =

Historic building in Virginia, US

- U.S. National Register of Historic Places
- Virginia Landmarks Register
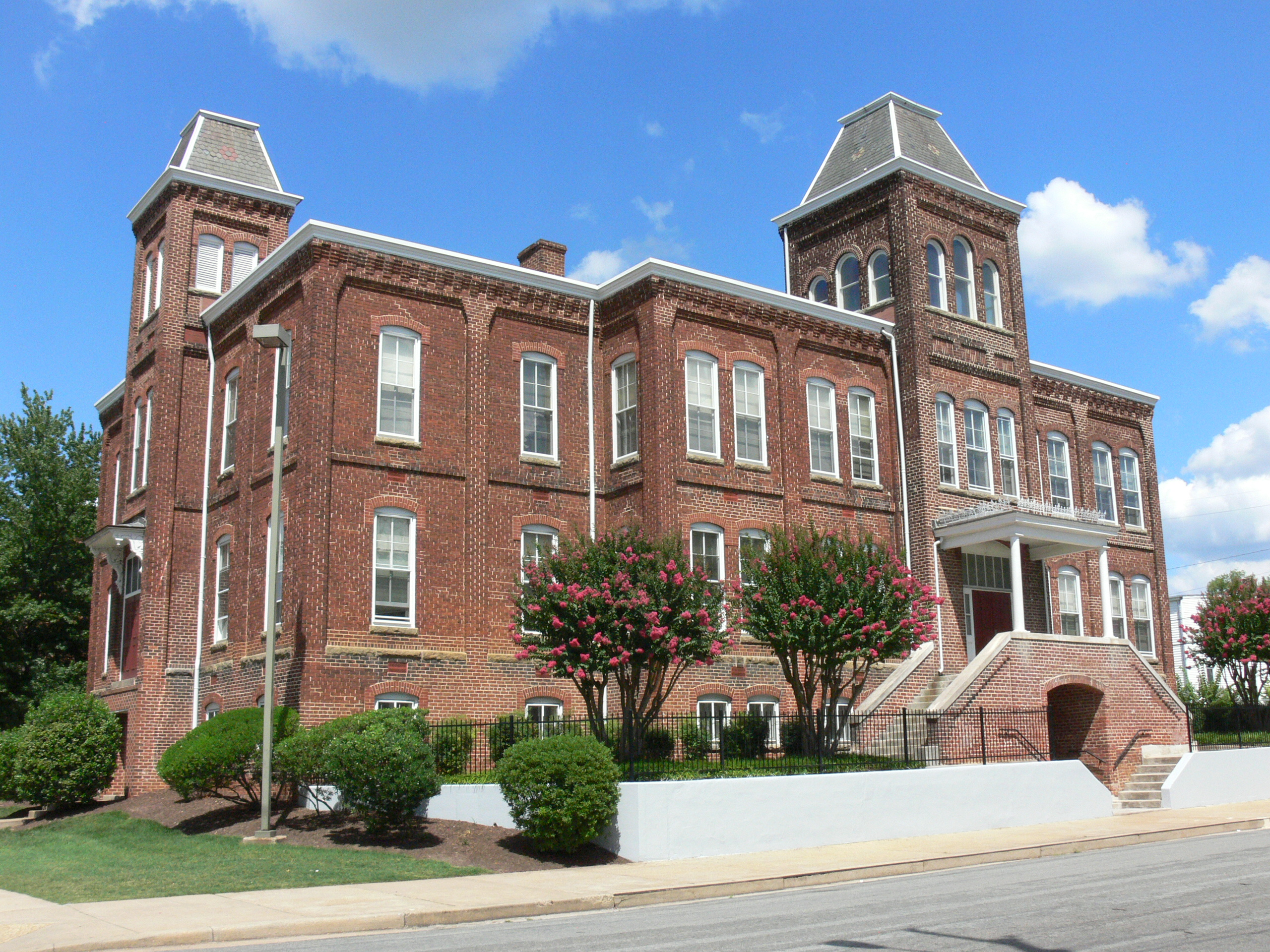
- Fairmount School, July 2011

- Location within Virginia Location within the United States
- Location: 1501 N. 21st St., Richmond, Virginia
- Coordinates: 37°32′36″N 77°24′46″W
- Area: 2.4 acres (0.97 ha)
- Built: 1895
- Architect: Huntt, Albert F.
- Architectural style: Gothic Revival
- MPS: Public Schools of Richmond MPS
- NRHP reference No.: 05001227
- VLR No.: 127-0308

Significant dates
- Added to NRHP: November 9, 2005
- Designated VLR: September 14, 2005

Fairmount School, which became known as Helen Dickinson School from 1925 until 1958 (when it returned to its original name) and is now the Fairmount House, is a historic school building located in Richmond, Virginia. The two-story brick building was constructed circa 1895 on a high basement in the Gothic Revival style. It features two slate-covered, mansard roofed towers. A two-story addition designed by Albert F. Huntt (1868–1920) was added in 1908–1909.

It was added to the National Register of Historic Places in 2005. The school is similar architecturally to Randolph School (Richmond, Virginia) which also survives.

September 1958, upon its conversion to a Negro school with pupils from Bowler, Buchanan, George Mason, and Woodville. Under Plan III, Fairmount was paired with Francis.

It became Fairmount School again in 1958, after being renamed Helen Dickinson in 1925 to honor a former principal, and became a school for African-Americans. It closed in 1979, was sold by the City of Richmond in 1981, and was restored by Churchill-Fairmount Limited Partnership for use by elderly and handicapped persons.
