= West Broad Street Industrial and Commercial Historic District =

Historic district in Virginia, United States

- U.S. National Register of Historic Places
- U.S. Historic district
- Virginia Landmarks Register
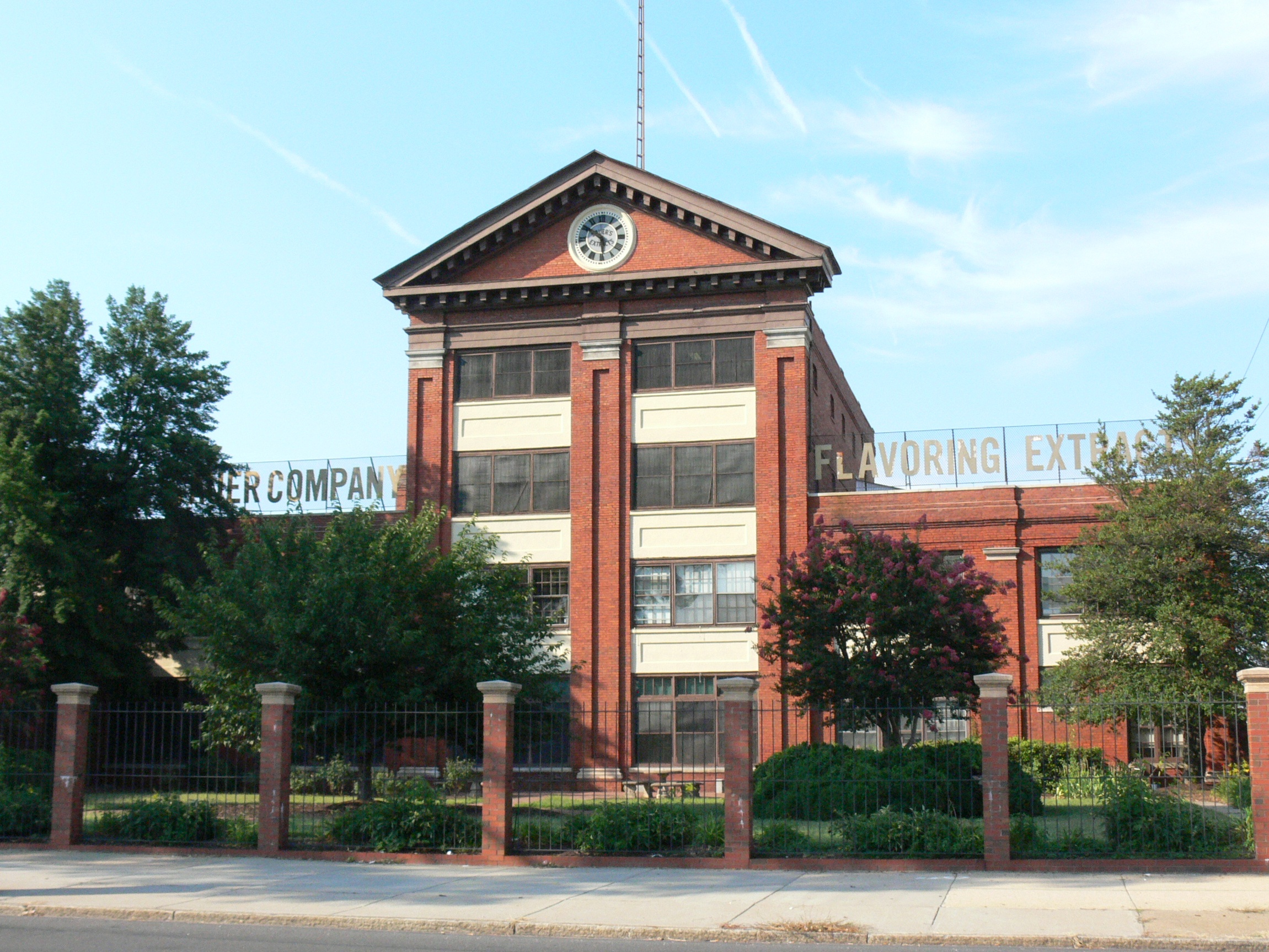
- C.F. Sauer Company Headquarters, July 2011

- Location within Virginia Location within the United States
- Location: 1800-2100 blocks of Broad & Marshall Sts., bounded by Allison & Allen Sts., Richmond, Virginia
- Coordinates: 37°33′26″N 77°27′37″W
- Area: 40 acres (16 ha)
- Built: c. 1902
- Architect: multiple
- Architectural style: Late 19th And 20th Century Revivals, Late 19th And Early 20th Century American Movements, et al.
- NRHP reference No.: 11000550
- VLR No.: 127-6570

Significant dates
- Added to NRHP: August 18, 2011
- Designated VLR: June 16, 2011

The West Broad Street Industrial and Commercial Historic District is a national historic district located at Richmond, Virginia. The district encompasses 29 contributing buildings and 1 contributing object built between 1902 and the 1930s. The District is characterized by a variety of architectural styles, including large industrial vernacular buildings, standard post-1900 commercial storefronts, and a large Modern-style department store. The majority of the buildings are two-to-four stories in height and are composed of brick with stucco, stone and metal detailing. Notable buildings include Putney Shoe Factory (1910), C.F. Sauer Headquarters (1910), L.H. Jenkins Book Manufactory (1902), Virginia School Supply Company (1913), the Coca-Cola Bottling Plant (1925), and the former Sears department store (c. 1946). Located in the district is the separately listed Atlantic Motor Company.

It was added to the National Register of Historic Places in 2011.
