= Randolph (surname) =

The origins of the surname Randolph: English and German: classicized spelling of Randolf, Germanic personal name composed of the elements "rand", "rim" (of a shield), "shield" + "wolf". This was introduced into England by Scandinavian settlers in the Old Norse form Rannúlfr, and was reinforced after the Norman Conquest by the Norman form Rannulf.

== List of people with the surname ==
- A. Philip Randolph (1889–1979), African-American civil rights leader
- Augustine Randolf (born 2001), Ghanaian professional footballer
- Amanda Randolph (1896–1967), American actress and singer
- Anders Randolf (1870–1930), Danish-American actor
- Ann Cary Randolph Morris (1774–1837), a/k/a Nancy Randolph, American anti-slavery activist
- Arthur Raymond Randolph (born 1943), American judge
- Beverley Randolph (1754–1797), American politician from Virginia, eighth Governor of Virginia (1788–1791)
- Cyril Randolph (1826–1912), English cricketer and clergyman
- Darren Randolph, an Irish professional footballer
- Da'Vine Joy Randolph (born 1986), American actress
- Edmund Randolph (1753–1813), politician from Virginia
- Epes Randolph (1856–1921), American civil engineer and businessman
- George W. Randolph (1818–1867), grandson of Thomas Jefferson and Secretary of War of the Confederate States of America.
- Homer Louis "Boots" Randolph III (1927–2007), American musician
- Isabel Randolph (1889–1973), American character actress
- Jane Randolph (1915–2009), American actress
- Jennings Randolph (1902–1998), politician from West Virginia
- John Randolph, 3rd Earl of Moray (died 1346), joint regent of Scotland, son of the 1st earl and brother of the 2nd
- Sir John Randolph (1693–1737), Speaker of the House of Burgesses and Attorney General for the Colony of Virginia
- John Randolph (loyalist) (1727–1784), lawyer and king's attorney for Virginia from 1766 until he left for Britain at the outset of the American Revolution
- John Randolph of Roanoke (1773–1833), American politician
- Joyce Randolph (1924–2024), American actress
- Keith Randolph Jr. (born 2001), American football player
- Lee Fritz Randolph (1880–1956), American painter, educator, academic administrator
- Levi Randolph (born 1992), American basketball player for Hapoel Jerusalem of the Israeli Basketball Premier League
- Lillian Randolph (1898–1980), American actress and singer
- Lingan S. Randolph (1859–1922), American mechanical and consulting engineer
- Lonnie Randolph (Indiana politician) (born 1949), Indiana State Senator
- Lonnie Randolph Jr. (1950–2024), American civil rights activist
- Lowell Fitz Randolph (1894–1980), American botanist and orofessor of botany, Cornell University
- Mary Randolph (1762–1828), Virginia author
- M. J. Randolph (born 1999), American basketball player
- Ned Randolph (1942–2016), American politician
- Peyton Randolph (1721–1775), first president of the Continental Congress
- Paschal Beverly Randolph (1825–1875), American medical doctor, occultist, and writer
- Richard Randolph (1686–1749), House of Burgesses member, Treasurer of Virginia
- Robert Randolph and the Family Band, American musicians
- Stephen Randolph (born 1974), American baseball player
- Stephen Randolph (historian), American historian and civil servant
- Thomas Randolph, 1st Earl of Moray (d. 1332), leader in the Wars of Scottish Independence
- Thomas Randolph, 2nd Earl of Moray (d. 1332), Scottish military commander, son of the above
- Thomas Randolph (ambassador), English ambassador serving Elizabeth I of England
- Thomas Jefferson Randolph (1792–1875), grandson of Thomas Jefferson
- Vance Randolph (1892–1980), American folklorist
- Virginia Randolph Cary (1786–1852), Virginia author
- William Randolph (1650–1711), Virginia colonist
- William Randolph II (1681–1741), aka William Randolph, Jr. or Councillor Randolph, Treasurer of Virginia
- Willie Randolph (born 1954), Major League Baseball manager and player
- Zach Randolph (born 1981), National Basketball Association player for the Memphis Grizzlies

== See also ==
- Justice Randolph (disambiguation)
- Randolph (given name)
