= Elisabeth Bleyleben-Koren =

Austrian bank manager (born 1948)

- Born: 9 October 1948 (age 77); Mödling
- Occupation: Wriezen

Elisabeth Bleyleben-Koren (born 9 October 1948) is an Austrian bank manager. In 2008 she was awarded the Decoration of Honour for Services to the Republic of Austria.

== Life ==
Elisabeth Bleyleben-Koren was born in Mödling in 1948. Her father was Stephan Koren who was an Austrian Finance Minister and bank manager.

Bleyleben-Koren studied law at university before joining Creditanstalt-Bankverein. She left to join Die Erste Oesterreichische Spar-Casse to do commercial banking in 1977. In 1997, she won the Veuve Clicquot Business Woman of the Year award and she joined the Management Board of Erste Bank rising to be Vice Chairperson from 1999 on. Since 2007, Bleyleben-Koren has been She became General Director for the Austrian part split-off of Erste Bank.

Bleyleben-Koren retired in June 2010.

== Awards ==
- 1997 Veuve Clicquot Business Woman of the Year
- 2008 Grand Silver Decoration of Honour for Services to the Republic of Austria
- 2010 Goldenen Ehrenzeichen für Verdienste um das Land Wien
