= Otis Manson =

American architect (died 1862)

Otis Manson (died 1862) was an architect in Richmond, Virginia known for his residential building designs. Richmond architect. He died in North Carolina.

Captain Manson served in the War of 1812, in Captain Richardson's corps d'elite for the defending Richmond, was a member of the City Council, and was one of the first architects in Virginia. He designed the Union Hotel for Mayor Adams.

Albert F. Huntt was his great-grandson.
