= Wallace F. Randolph =

United States general

Wallace Fitz Randolph
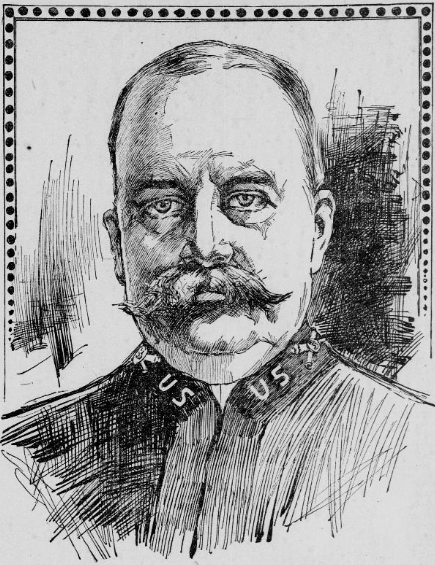
- Born: June 11, 1841; Bridesburg, Pennsylvania, U.S.
- Died: December 9, 1910 (aged 69); Washington, D.C., U.S.
- Burial place: Arlington National Cemetery, Arlington County, Virginia, U.S.
- Military career
- Allegiance: United States of America
- Branch: United States Army
- Service years: 1861–1904
- Rank: Major General
- Conflicts: American Civil War: Second Battle of Winchester; Siege of Petersburg; Spanish–American War

Wallace Fitz Randolph (June 11, 1841 – December 9, 1910) was a United States Army major general who enlisted as a private at the start of the American Civil War, rose in rank to Major General and, after serving in the artillery branch his entire career, became the first U.S. Army Chief of Artillery.

== Early life and career ==
General Randolph was born in Bridesburg, Philadelphia on June 11, 1841, to Dr. Charles Fitz and Margaret "Gooch" Randolph. His older brother was Edmund Dutilh Randolph, a New York City banker and insurance executive.

== Military career ==
=== American Civil War ===
On April 18, 1861, Randolph enlisted as a private in Company F of the 17th Pennsylvania Infantry. He remained in that unit until June 28, 1861, when he was transferred to the newly formed Fifth United States Field Artillery and commissioned as a Second Lieutenant. His cousin, Colonel Lorenzo Thomas arranged for his promotion. The unit was formed by proclamation of President Lincoln on May 4, 1861, but not ratified by Congress until mid July. All appointees of the unit, including Randolph, had their ranks dated from May 14, 1861.

His gallantry and display of good judgment in action near Winchester, Virginia, during the Second Battle of Winchester, earned him a brevet to Captain in 1863. It was during this time, Confederate forces captured Lieutenant Randolph's artillery battery and he was wounded. Sent to the infamous Libby prison, a converted brick warehouse in Richmond, Virginia, Randolph worked with others for eight months, standing watch and helping with the digging, eventually escaping the Libby prison. Over the week following, he was able to make his way through the city and into the swamps, avoiding capture until finally making his way to Federal troop positions near Williamsburg, Virginia.

He quickly returned to action, and was commended on many occasions for his bravery and efficiency. In 1864, during the Battle of Fair Oaks & Darbytown Road, he was Aide-de-camp for the Fifth U.S. Artillery.

On March 13, 1865, at the close of the war, he was made a brevet Major of Volunteers "for good conduct and meritorious services during the war."

After the American Civil War, Randolph continued to serve in light artillery units with the 5th Artillery, primarily stationed at Fort Hamilton, New York. In 1876, when his company (Company C) was ordered to Charleston, South Carolina, he moved with it. In 1877, during the labor strikes, he took his battery to various towns in Pennsylvania, West Virginia and Maryland to aid in suppressing violence and protecting property. By November 1881, the 5th Artillery was back in garrison in the forts in New York Harbor, headquartered again at Fort Hamilton.

Notable amongst ceremonial details in which he participated were funerals for Ulysses S. Grant, and General Winfield Scott Hancock. He also participated in the unveiling of the Statue of Liberty, where his 5th Artillery and Captain Ferdinand P. Earle's National Guard battery exchanged a Feu de joie salute.

In 1888, after promotion to Major, he was assigned to the 3rd Artillery. Initially stationed at Washington Barracks, he served in various billets within the 3rd Artillery's, including Chief Signal Officer, Inspector Artillery Target Practice, and Division Inspector of Artillery.

By 1892, he was artillery sub-post and artillery sub-school commander at Fort Riley, Kansas. In 1892, he participated in the dedication ceremony for the World's Columbian Exposition (i.e., the Chicago World's Fair). Almost two years later, he was back in Chicago, commanding a Federal artillery battalion in support of government activities during the labor strike there.

Following his promotion to Lieutenant Colonel in March 1898, Randolph received orders to go to San Francisco.

=== Spanish–American War ===
At the outbreak of the Spanish–American War, Randolph was promoted to Brigadier General, United States Volunteers, and placed in charge of a light artillery brigade at Port Tampa, Florida. He commanded all light artillery units throughout the war and participated in the Battle of Santiago de Cuba.

=== 1899–1904 ===
The Chief of Artillery was created by act February 2, 1901, with Randolph filling that role for first three years. The position would last until 1908, when the Field Artillery and Coast Artillery were made separate.

In 1903, when United States Secretary of War Elihu Root reformed the organization of the War Department and created a joint board, General Randolph was one of the four Army general officers assigned to serve on the board.

He retired in January 1904 to his home in Washington, D.C.

== Promotions ==
- Second Lieutenant, May 1861
- First Lieutenant, March 1862
- Brevet Captain, June 1863
- Brevet Major, March 1865
- Captain (permanent), July 1866
- Major (permanent), April 1888
- Lieutenant Colonel, March 1898
- Brigadier General, United States Volunteers, 1899
- Colonel, October 1899
- Chief of Artillery, April 1901
- Brigadier General, February 1903
- Major General, January 1904

== Affiliations ==
He was a member of the Society of the Army of the Potomac.

In 1899, he was elected as a principal officer in the Naval and Military Order of the Spanish–American War, representing the United States Volunteers. He was also made an officer in the Society of the Army of Santiago de Cuba.

After his retirement, he was a member of the Board of Governors at the Chevy Chase Club.

== Death and burial ==
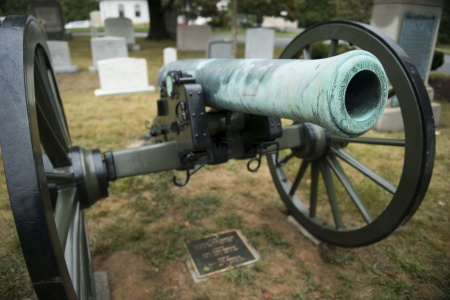
A US Civil War Napoleon Cannon which marks the gravesite of the first Chief of Artillery

About a year after his retirement, Randolph started showing signs of becoming mentally depressed. Over the years, he grew more despondent, and eventually sought treatment from an alienist. By this time, he was having hallucinations that unknown enemies were pursuing him and his family. On December 9, 1910, he committed suicide in the bathroom of his home on New Hampshire Avenue in Washington, D.C.

Honorary pallbearers at his funeral included Brigadier General Montgomery M. Macomb, Colonels Hamilton Rowan (retired) and Charles G. Treat, Majors Parker West (retired), George F. Landers, William Chamberlaine and Henry T. Allen, and Captains Edwin Landon, Johnson Hagood, and Dan Tyler Moore.

His grave marker is one of the most idiosyncratic in Arlington National Cemetery. His resting place, including that of his wife and two daughters, is marked by a twelve-hundred-pound Napoleon cannon. The brass fieldpiece, cast in 1862 and believed to have been used in combat during the American Civil War, was placed shortly after his funeral.

== Honors ==
One of the forts at the Panama Canal's Atlantic terminus was named Fort Randolph in his honor.

Camp Number 27 of the United Spanish War Veterans, in Yonkers, New York, was named for him.

The U.S. Army Mine Planter Major General Wallace F. Randolph. launched in 1942, is named for him.
