= English Village (Richmond, Virginia) =

Historic apartments in Virginia, US

- U.S. National Register of Historic Places
- Virginia Landmarks Register
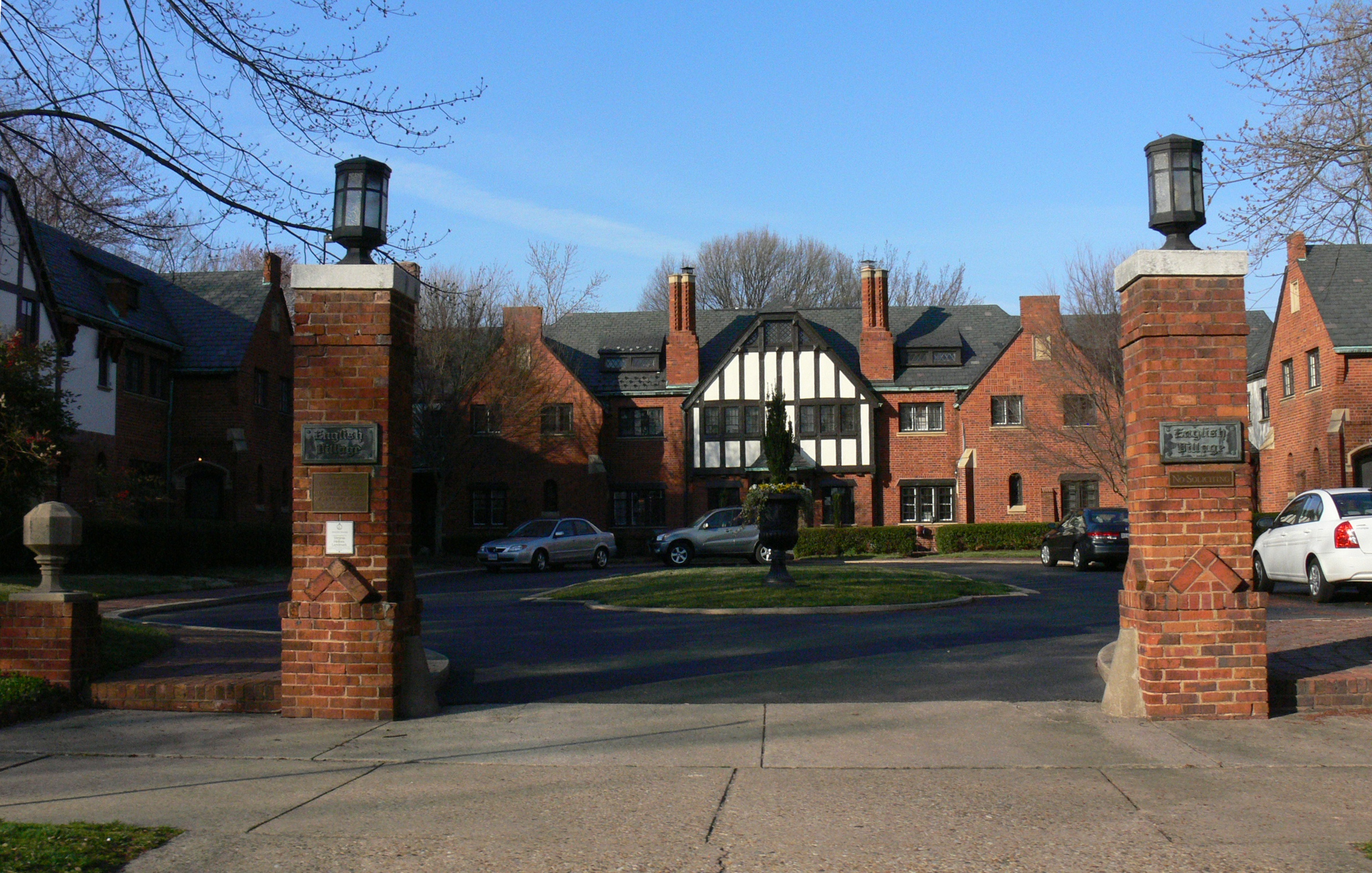
- English Village, March 2011

- Location within Virginia Location within the United States
- Location: 3418-3450 Grove Ave., Richmond, Virginia
- Coordinates: 37°33′31″N 77°29′3″W
- Area: 0.7 acres (0.28 ha)
- Built: 1927
- Architect: Bascom Joseph Rowlett; Davis Brothers
- Architectural style: Colonial, Tudor
- NRHP reference No.: 83003302
- VLR No.: 127-0374

Significant dates
- Added to NRHP: September 29, 1983
- Designated VLR: August 16, 1983

English Village is a historic cooperative apartment complex in Richmond, Virginia. The planned community was designed by Richmond architect Bascom Joseph Rowlett and built in 1927. It consists of Tudor Revival style brick and half-timber buildings. The building complex was listed on the National Register of Historic Places in 1983.

The development includes 17 attached 2 1/2-story units organized in a U-shape around a central courtyard set back from the street.

English Village is one of the first cooperatives in the city of Richmond, an early example of a 1920s planned community. The infrastructure is largely shared amongst the units, with radiant heating utilizing water delivered from a central boiler system.
