= Judge Randolph =

Judge Randolph may refer to:

- A. Raymond Randolph (born 1943), judge of the United States Court of Appeals for the District of Columbia Circuit
- Peter Randolph (judge) (1779–1832), judge of the United States District Court for the District of Mississippi

== See also ==
- Justice Randolph (disambiguation)
