= Major General Wallace F. Randolph (ship) =

Mine planter of The US Army

Coordinates: 24.6611°N 81.1031°W

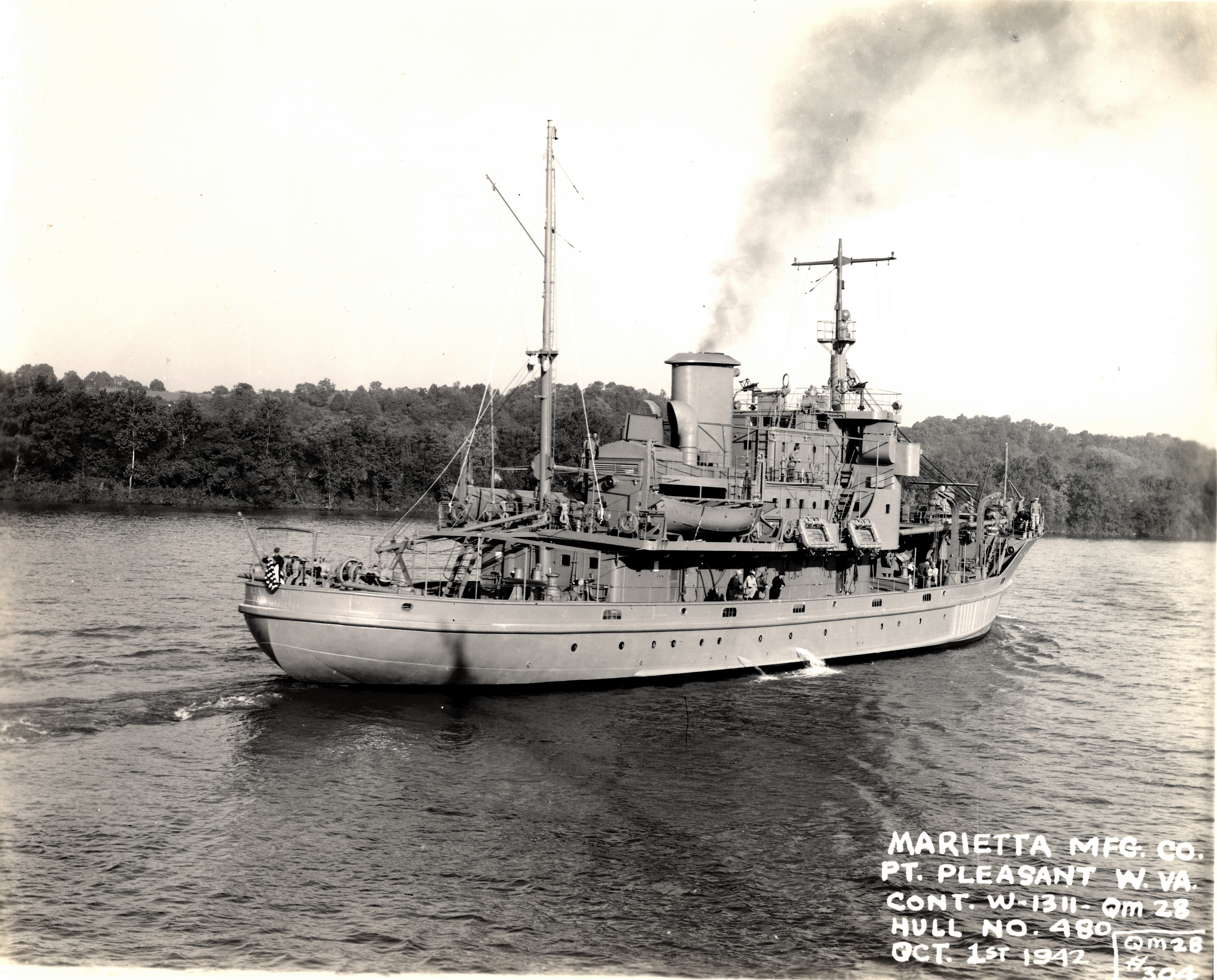
- USAMP MP-7 Major General Wallace F. Randolph, Army M 1 Mine Planter Hull No. 480. Records (#742), Special Collections Department, J. Y. Joyner Library, East Carolina University, Greenville, North Carolina, USA.

History

United States
- Name: Major General Wallace F. Randolph
- Namesake: Major General Wallace F. Randolph
- Owner: Florida Keys Artificial Reef Association
- Builder: Marietta Manufacturing Company
- Launched: 2 June 1942
- Commissioned: 1942
- Decommissioned: 1951
- In service: 1942
- Out of service: 1951
- Renamed: Nausett
- Stricken: 1 July 1960
- Fate: Intentionally sunk 6 March 1986 as an Artificial reef

General characteristics
- Type: Mine Planter
- Displacement: 910 long tons (920 t)
- Length: 189 ft (58 m)
- Beam: 37 ft (11 m)
- Draft: 12 ft (3.7 m)
- Speed: 12 knots (22 km/h)
- Complement: 135

USAMP Major General Wallace F. Randolph, sometimes also known as MG Wallace F. Randolph, was a 188.2-foot (57.4 m) mine planter built by the Marietta Manufacturing Company, and delivered to the United States Army Mine Planter Service in 1942. The ship was transferred to the U.S. Navy in 1951, placed directly into the Atlantic Reserve Fleet without being commissioned classed as the auxiliary minelayer ACM-15, then reclassified minelayer, auxiliary (MMA) and named MMA-15, and finally given the name Nausett without any active naval service. After being stricken from the Naval Vessel Register, the ship was transferred to different owners, and eventually was scuttled off the coast of Florida as an artificial reef and fish aggregating device. The site is currently known as the Thunderbolt Wreck, and is considered to be an excellent and challenging dive site for advanced divers.

== Army history ==
USAMP Major General Wallace F. Randolph was built by Marietta Manufacturing Company in Point Pleasant, West Virginia, and launched on 2 June 1942. She was one of 16 Army mine planters built in 1942 and 1943 for the U.S. Army Coast Artillery Corps, Mine Planter Service. This was the second Army Mine Planter to take the name of Major General Wallace F. Randolph, the first Chief of Artillery for the United States Army; the first being of the 1919 mine planter construction. (The first General W. P. Randolph became the United States Lighthouse Service vessel Lupine.)

== Navy and civilian history ==
In 1949, the United States Navy took over all coastal mine laying operations, and the Randolph was transferred to the Navy in March 1951, classed as a Camanche-class minelayer, a group that with one exception was neither converted from Army design nor saw active naval service, with the name ACM-15 and going directly into inactive reserve where she was redesignated MMA-15 on 7 February 1955 then named Nausett on 1 May 1955.

Subsequently transferred from the Atlantic Reserve Fleet, Charleston, South Carolina to reserve at Green Cove Springs, Florida she was struck from the Navy List on 1 July 1960, and was then stripped and sold to Caribbean Enterprises on 17 May 1961. She was subsequently renamed the Sea Searcher, and had a role in oilfield exploration. The vessel was later purchased by Florida Power & Light as a platform for lightning strike research. Researchers fired rockets trailing conductive wires into thunderclouds to trigger lightning strikes, which were then analyzed by instruments carried on the ship's deck. As many as 17 lightning strikes were captured on a single day in August 1966. During this period, she was re-christened Thunderbolt, because of the many hits she took.

== Thunderbolt wreck ==
Eventually, Thunderbolt was donated to the Florida Keys Artificial Reef Association, and the vessel was scuttled 4 nautical miles (7.4 km) south of Marathon, Florida and Key Colony Beach, Florida on 6 March 1986. The wreck sits on a flat sandy bottom 120 feet (37 m) below the surface of the water, nearly completely intact. The condition of the wreck and the abundance of marine life in and around the wreck make it an excellent dive site. The main superstructure was cleared of most entanglement hazard prior to sinking, so she provides ample opportunity for penetration. Her lower decks are largely clear of debris, although they can be very silty, and the many openings and exits in the deck provide easy entry and exit points.

Coral growth on the Thunderbolt is extensive, although less than similar wrecks like the USCGC Bibb and USCGC Duane. Bait fish, barracuda, mackerel, snapper, permit, pompano, jacks, and resident goliath grouper, are often seen on the wreck, as well as the occasional black grouper and reef sharks. The area around the ship is mostly barren sand with occasional conch and hogfish. The anchor chain extends westerly, on the port side, outward on the sandy bottom, towards several rubble piles made up of concrete pilings and steel plates. The wreck has no surface markers. Instead, two floats are attached by steel cables to the bow and stern of wreck, respectively, and extend to within 25 feet of the surface. Local dive shops periodically service these underwater makers which are visible from the surface.

Current can become considerable on the Thunderbolt, which coupled with its depth, makes it an advanced dive. Most divers on the Thunderbolt opt to use an Enriched Air (32% O_{2}) mixture because of the significant increase in bottom time and shorter surface intervals, especially for repetitive dives.

== See also ==
- The Thunderbolt, Florida Keys National Marine Sanctuary, National Oceanic and Atmospheric Administration (Photos & diagrams in tabs)
- List of ships of the United States Army
