= Atlantic Motor Company =

Historic structure in Virginia, US

- U.S. National Register of Historic Places
- Virginia Landmarks Register
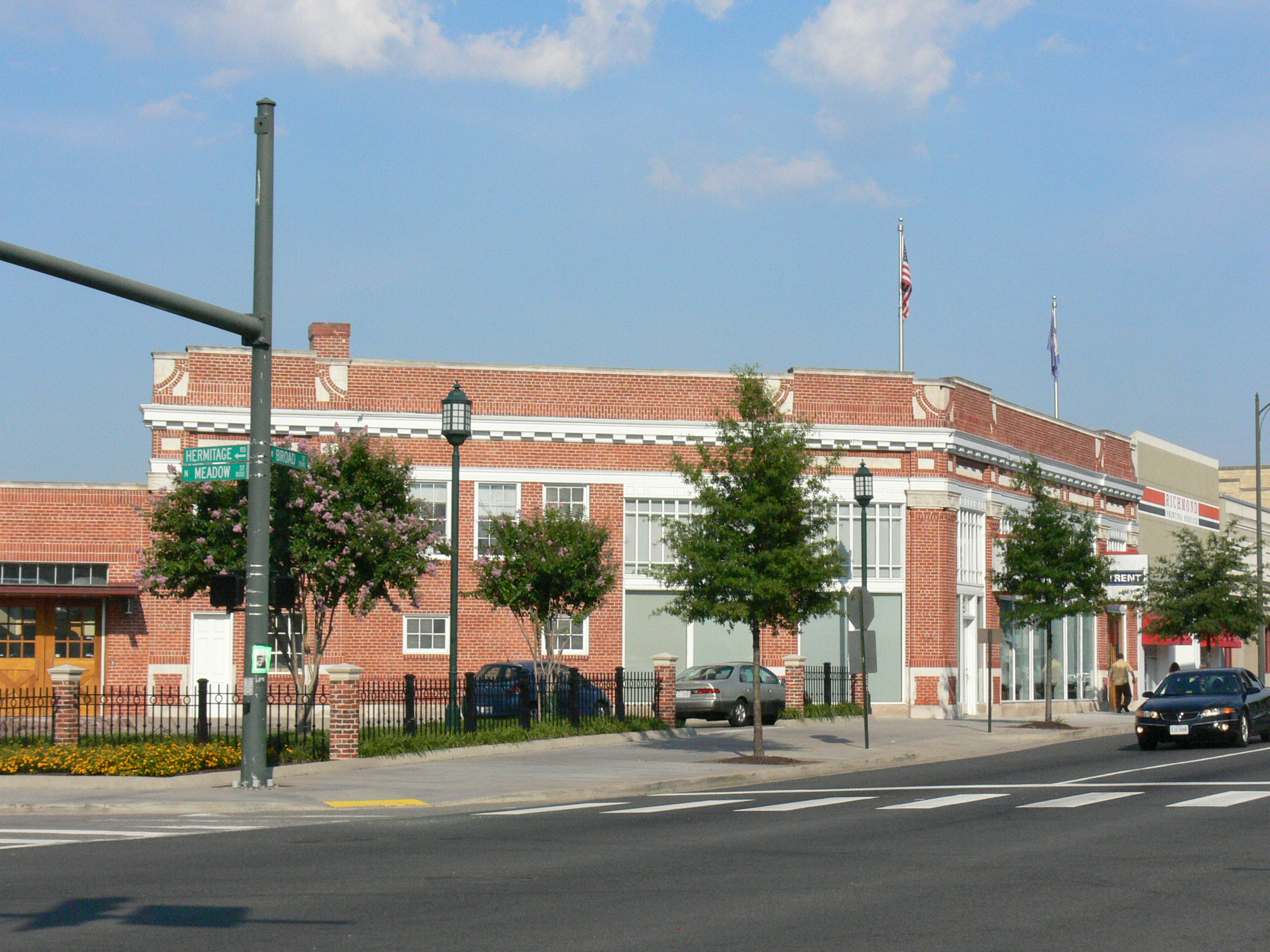
- Atlantic Motor Company building

- Location within Virginia Location within the United States
- Location: 1840 W. Broad St., Richmond, Virginia
- Coordinates: 37.55676°N 77.45996°W
- Area: less than one acre
- Built: 1919
- Architect: Albert F. Huntt; Bascom Joseph Rowlett
- Architectural style: Classical Revival
- NRHP reference No.: 05001271
- VLR No.: 127-6163

Significant dates
- Added to NRHP: November 16, 2005
- Designated VLR: September 14, 2005

Atlantic Motor Company is a historic automobile showroom and gas station constructed in 1919 in Richmond, Virginia. The building was designed by Richmond architect Albert F. Huntt with Bascomb J. Rowlett. It was added to the National Register of Historic Places on November 16, 2005. It is located at 1840 West Broad Street.

The building was empty for two decades until being converted into retail space and offices after 2004 with the support of tax credits.

== See also ==
- National Register of Historic Places listings in Richmond, Virginia
