= Randolph School (Richmond, Virginia) =

- U.S. National Register of Historic Places
- Virginia Landmarks Register
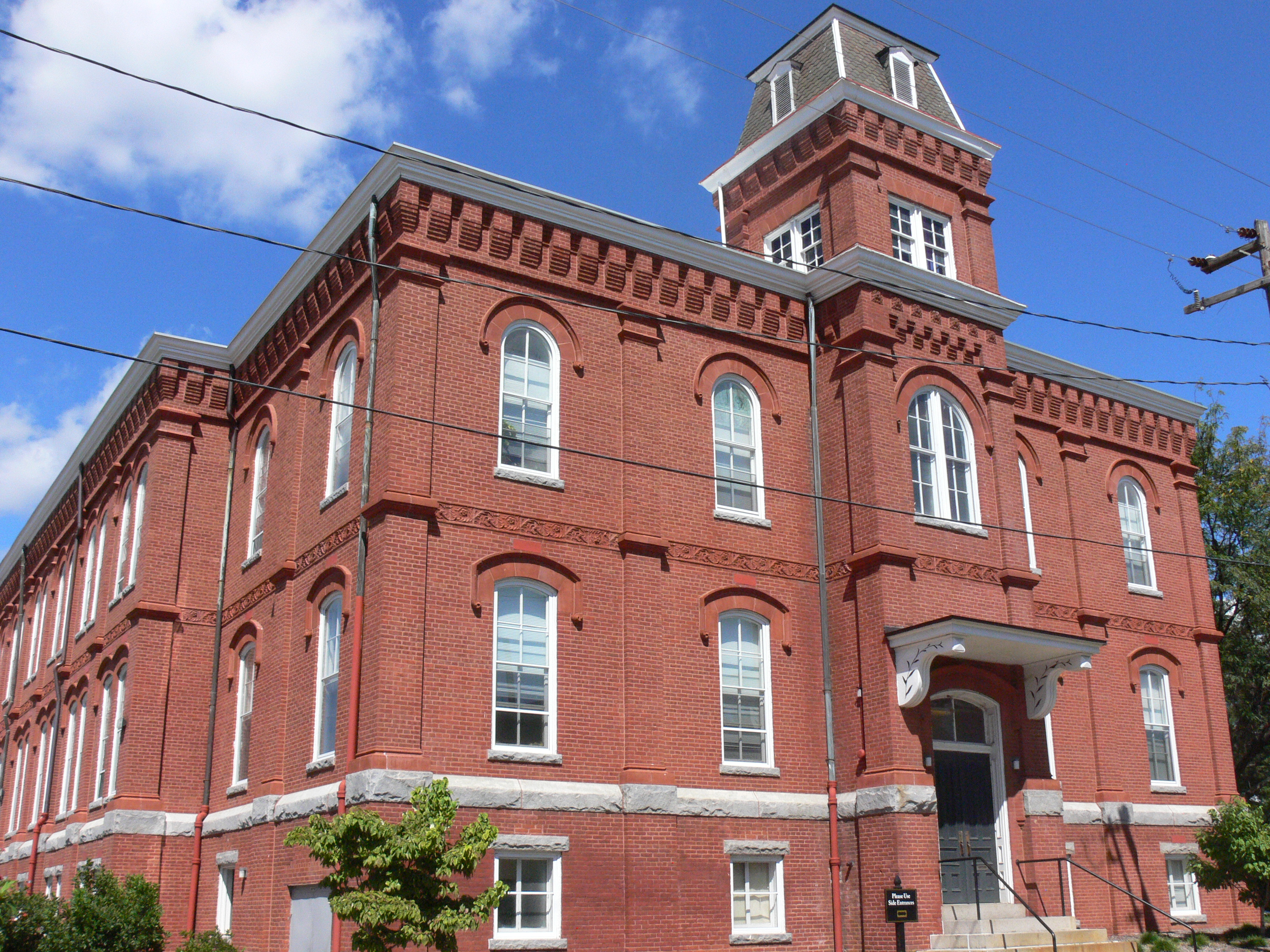
- Randolph School, September 2012

- Location within Virginia Location within the United States
- Location: 300 S. Randolph St., Richmond, Virginia
- Coordinates: 37°32′37″N 77°27′38″W
- Area: 0.7 acres (0.28 ha)
- Built: 1896, 1900, 1934, 1952
- Architectural style: Italianate
- NRHP reference No.: 84000050
- VLR No.: 127-0388

Significant dates
- Added to NRHP: October 4, 1984
- Designated VLR: August 21, 1984

Randolph School is a historic school in Richmond, Virginia. The oldest part was constructed in 1896, with additions made in 1900, 1934, and 1952. It is a 2 1/2-story, brick school building in the Italianate style. It features a four-story entrance tower with a mansard roof, ornamental terra cotta string course, brick corbelling and window hoods. Some of the rooms retain their original tin ceilings.

Randolph School's architect and builder are unknown. The building's architecture is similar to Fairmount School in Richmond, which also remains in existence. The Fairmont School architectural style has been referred to as simplified Empire style with Gothic Revival details.

Randolph School served an area then known as Sydney that included ironworkers and stonecutters. When it opened in 1896 tuition was $8.17, teachers earned $50 annually, and the principal $150. It became a "colored" school in 1930. Expansions added junior high school accommodations, a gymnasium, and cafeteria.

It served various grades until 1970. It became a special education center until 1974, and was then closed. It was a community center for a time, since then has been rehabilitated as apartments for the elderly.

It was added to the National Register of Historic Places on October 4, 1984.

== See also ==
- National Register of Historic Places listings in Richmond, Virginia
