= Randolph Bainbridge House =

Historic house in Massachusetts, United States

- U.S. National Register of Historic Places
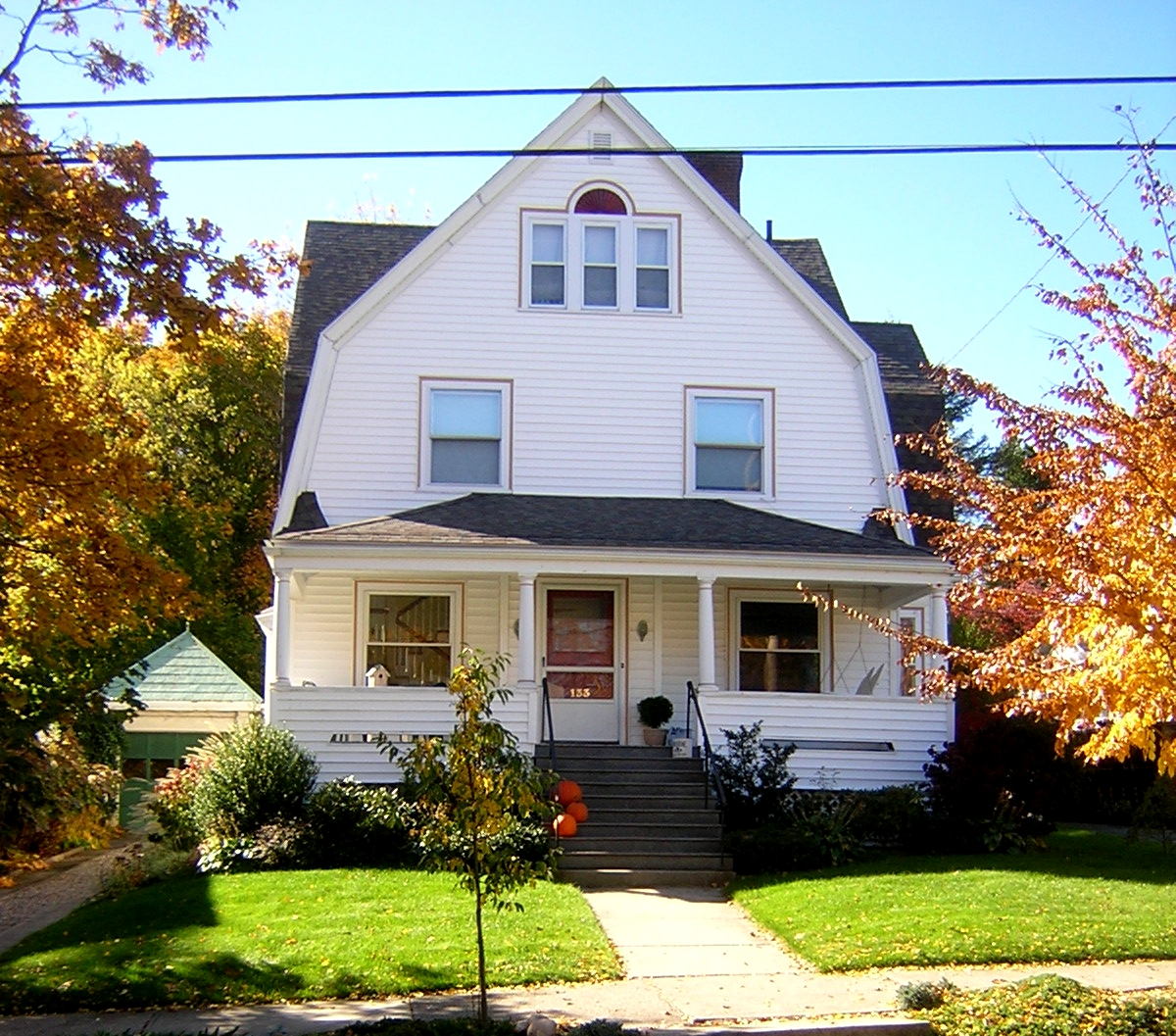

- Location within Massachusetts Location within the United States
- Location: 133 Grandview Ave., Quincy, Massachusetts
- Coordinates: 42°15′41″N 71°1′3″W
- Area: less than one acre
- Built: c. 1900
- Architectural style: Shingle Style
- MPS: Quincy MRA
- NRHP reference No.: 89001340
- Added to NRHP: September 20, 1989

The Randolph Bainbridge House is a historic house in Quincy, Massachusetts. Built about 1900, it is a good example of Shingle Style architecture. It was listed on the National Register of Historic Places in 1989.

== Description and history ==
The Randolph Bainbridge House is located in Quincy's Wollaston neighborhood, on the west side of Grandview Avenue between Warren and South Central Avenues. It is a large 2 1/2-story wood-frame house, with a cross-gable gambrel roof, wood shingle exterior, and a single-story porch across the front. The gables have small Palladian windows at their peaks, and the porch has a hip roof supported by Tuscan columns. The front facade is three bays across on the ground floor, with a center entrance, and two bays across on the second floor. A one-car garage stands at the rear of the property.

Land in the area was purchased for development as a status residential area in 1870, after the Old Colony Railroad introduced commuter rail service into Quincy. Development was spurred in part by the railroad's offer of three years of free service to new home buyers, and most of the area had been built out by 1900. This house was built c. 1900 by Randolph Bainbridge, the Quincy Commissioner of Public Works. It is one of the more architecturally sophisticated houses on Grandview Avenue.

== See also ==
- National Register of Historic Places listings in Quincy, Massachusetts
