= Randolph Miller =

American journalist

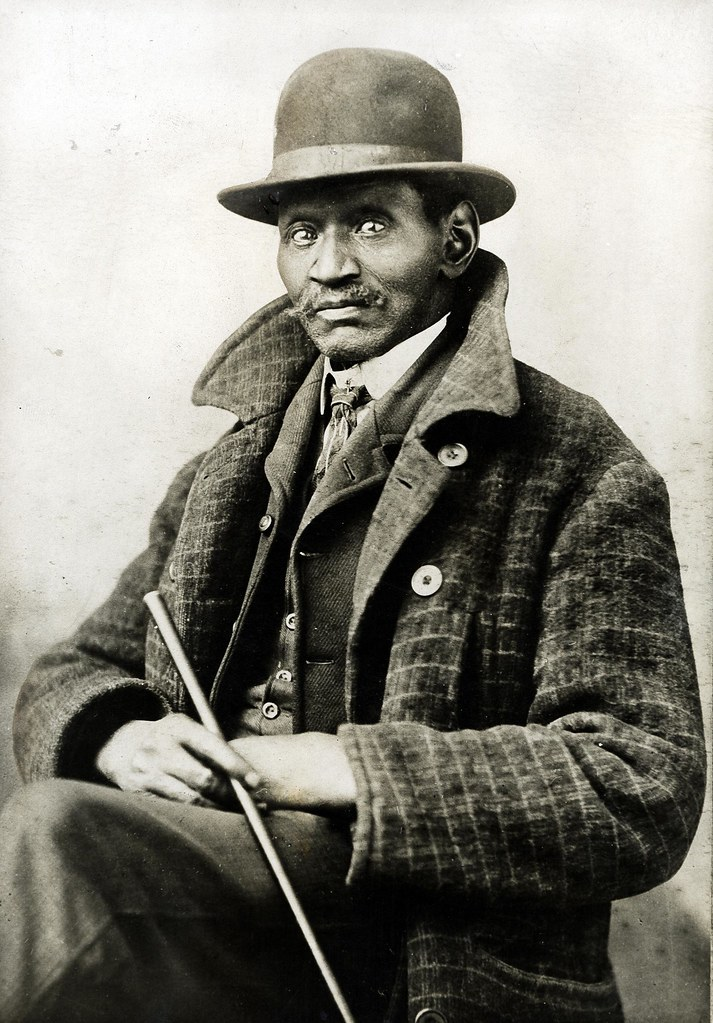
- Born: 1829 or 1830
- Died: 1916 (aged 86)
- Resting place: Forest Hills Cemetery

Randolph Miller was an African-American and former slave from Newton, Georgia. He was best known as an activist and journalist.

== Biography ==
In October 1864, Miller moved to Chattanooga, Tennessee and worked as a pressman for the Chattanooga Gazette. He spent some time in Richmond, Virginia, but soon returned again to Chattanooga to work for the Chattanooga Times, which was edited and published by Adolph S. Ochs at the time. Miller eventually started his own newspaper, the Weekly Blade, in 1898. The Blade ran for over a decade and it highlighted Miller's values and condemnation of segregation and civil rights restrictions. There is just one known extant copy of the Weekly Blade, located in the Tennessee State Library and Archives.

Miller was regarded in both the black and white communities for his personal and editorial style, predating Dr. Martin Luther King Jr. by fifty years as a black leader in Chattanooga. He was an organizer of the streetcar system in protest of a 1905 segregation law against passengers. During the same year, he began his own taxi service, the Hack Line, that ran between Chattanooga and other African-American communities.

One of his editorials stated: "They have taken our part of the library; they have moved our school to the frog pond; they have passed the Jim Crow law; they have knocked us out of the jury box; they have played the devil generally; and what in thunder will they do no one knows."

Randolph Miller stopped publication of the Weekly Blade after twelve years due to declining health and overwork. He died in 1916 at the age of eighty-six and buried in the Forest Hills Cemetery in Chattanooga.
