= Randolph W. Washington =

Florida state legislator (born 1852)

Randolph W. Washington (c. 1852 – ?) was an American teacher and state legislator in Florida. He represented Jefferson County, Florida in the Florida House of Representatives in 1885. His post office was in Monticello, Florida.

== See also ==
- African American officeholders from the end of the Civil War until before 1900
