= Randall Dodd =

American economist

Randall Dodd is the founder and director for Financial Policy Forum in Washington, DC, United States, a non-profit organization that deals with regulation of financial markets.

He received a Ph.D. in Economics from the Columbia University, where he specialized in international trade and finance. He has taught at both Columbia and Johns Hopkins Universities. He was also legislative director for congressman Joe Kennedy.
