= Justice Randolph =

Justice Randolph may refer to:

- Joseph Fitz Randolph (1803–1873), associate justice of the New Jersey Supreme Court
- Michael K. Randolph (born 1946), chief justice of the Supreme Court of Mississippi

== See also ==
- Judge Randolph (disambiguation)
