= Randolph Woolridge =

Australian cricket umpire (1956–2009)

Personal information
- Born: 1 May 1956; India
- Died: 9 May 2009 (aged 53); Perth, Western Australia

Umpiring information
- FC umpired: 12 (1998–2001)
- LA umpired: 11 (1998–2001)
- Source: CricketArchive, 22 February 2010

Randolph Joseph Woolridge (1 May 1956 – 9 May 2009) was a first-class cricket umpire.

== Umpiring career ==
Wooldridge began umpiring in the WACA District competition in the 1994/95 season.

Woolridge made his first-class debut in 1998 in a Sheffield Shield match between Western Australia and Victoria at the WACA Ground. He made his 12th and final appearance in first-class cricket in December 2001. He also umpired 11 List A cricket matches between 1998 and 2001.
