= Randolph M. Bell =

American diplomat

Randolph Marshall Bell (born 1947) is a former ambassador of the United States.

== Education ==
Randolph Marshall Bell went to the College of William and Mary and to the Cambridge University. Further he completed Advanced East European Area Studies at the Foreign Service Institute and attended the National Defense University.

== Career ==
In August 1972 he entered the Foreign Service. He was assigned to postings in Frankfurt, Prague and Vienna as well as to the State Department Operations Center. Subsequently he started working for the Office of the Secretary of Defense, where he was facing Soviet and East European political issues (1984–1985). After serving as Political-Economic Counselor in Prague from 1985 to 1988, he was becoming Political Counselor in Brussels. From 1993 to 1996 he directed the Office of Russian and Eurasian Affairs in the Bureau of Intelligence and Research. He also served as Director of the Office of Benelux, United Kingdom and Ireland (1996–1999), managing U.S. policy for relations with these countries.

In September 1999 he went to Bern to serve as interim Chargé d'Affaires. In the summer of 2000 he returned, to take up his assignment as Director for Austria, Switzerland and Germany Affairs. In 2003 he was retired from the U.S. State Department. In the end of June 2009 he also took a step down from being the executive director of the World Affairs Council of Greater Richmond. He has remained a member of the board of directors.

== Holocaust remembrance ==
Bell led the U.S. team that helped organize the London Conference on Nazi Gold in December 1997 and negotiated the successful closeout of the postwar Tripartite Gold Commission. Also he played a role in establishing the $61 million Nazi Persecutee Relief Fund, for victims who had previously received little or no compensation. Bell worked with Treasury Deputy Secretary Stuart E. Eizenstat in negotiating the agreements with Austria in 2000 and 2001 for refunds to former World War II forced laborers and to individuals who lost property during that period.

As Special Envoy for Holocaust Issues, he served as a member of the Board of Trustees of the German Foundation, Remembrance, Responsibility and the Future and as an observer to the International Commission on Holocaust Era Insurance Claims. He is on the board of the Virginia Holocaust Museum and part of the International Council of the Austrian Service Abroad.

== Honours ==
On 25 February 2004 Bell received the Grand Decoration of Honour in Silver for Services to the Republic of Austria. He has also received the Department of State's Superior Honor Award, four times. In 2021, Bell was appointed Commander of the Most Venerable Order of St John.

== Arms ==
Coat of arms of Randolph M. Bell
Notes Bell received a grant of honorary arms, crest and badge from the College of Arms on 26 April 2024. Crest Two dexter hands clasped fesswise Or holding between them a sprig of olive leaved Vert fructed Sable. Escutcheon Sable six lozenges conjoined in pall reversed between three church bells Argent. Motto Ex Fide Fortis Badge Two sprigs of olive in saltire leaved Vert fructed Sable surmounted by a church bell Or.
