= Randulf =

Randulf is a masculine given name which may refer to:

- Pandulf Ironhead (died 981), also spelled Randulf, Prince of Benevento and Capua, Duke of Spoleto and Camerino and Prince of Salerno
- Ranulf (chancellor) (died 1123), also spelled Randulf, English cleric and Lord Chancellor for King Henry I
- Randulf of Evesham, (fl. 13th century), medieval Bishop of Worcester elect and Abbot of Evesham
- Randulf Dalland, (1900–1984), Norwegian politician
- Randulf Hansen (1858–1942), Norwegian ship designer
