= Randall Smith =

Randall Smith or Randal Smith may refer to:

- Randall D. Smith (born 1943/44), American hedge fund manager
- Randall Lee Smith, (died 2008), American, convicted murderer
- Randal Smith, 2nd Baron Bicester
- Randall Brian Smith (baseball)
- Randall Smith, founder of U.S. guitar amplifier manufacturer Mesa/Boogie

== See also ==
- Randy Smith (disambiguation)
