= American Cigar Company (Norfolk, Virginia) =

- U.S. National Register of Historic Places
- Virginia Landmarks Register
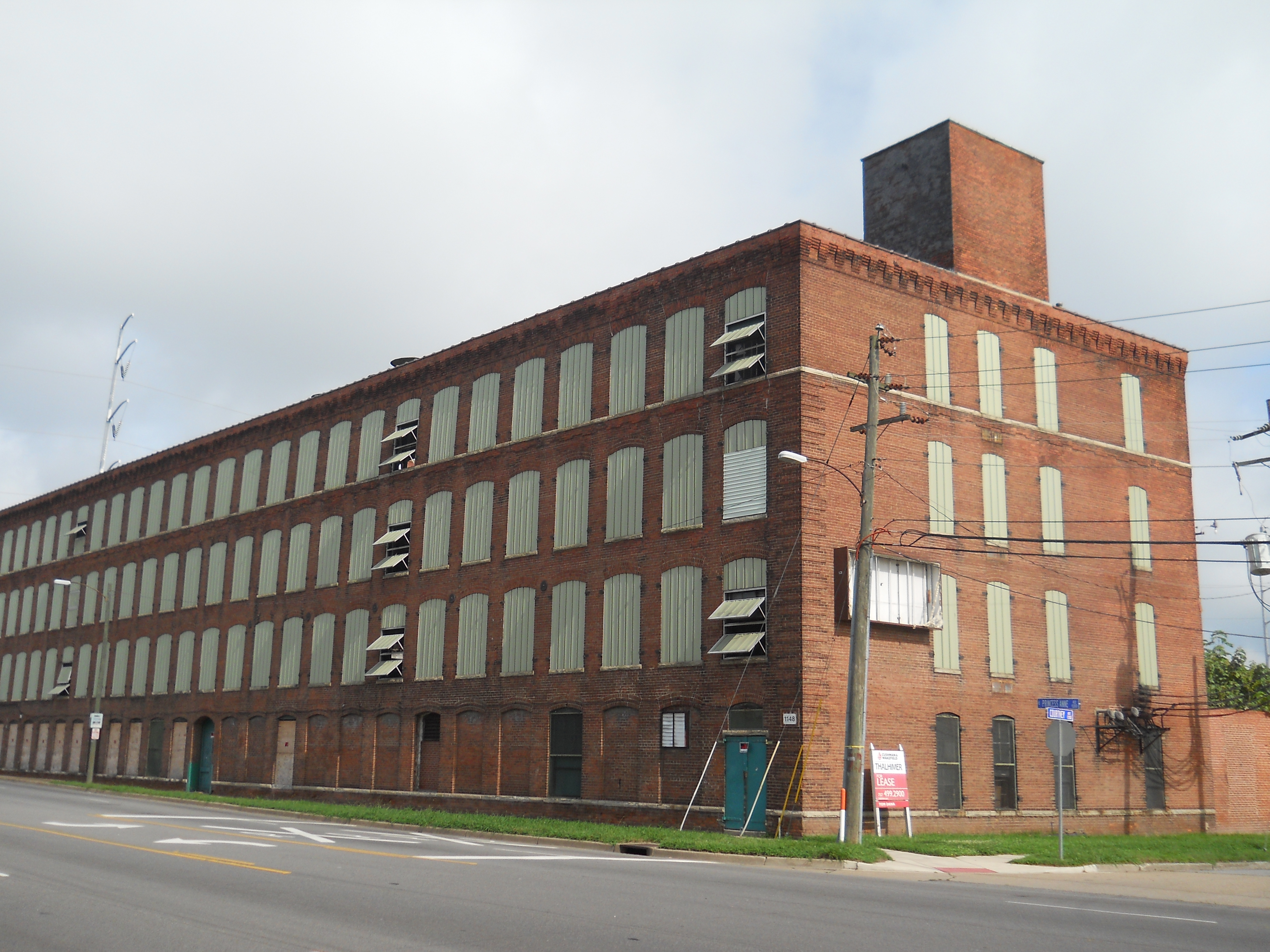
- American Cigar Company, September 2013

- Location within Virginia Location within the United States
- Location: 1148 E. Princess Anne Rd., Norfolk, Virginia
- Coordinates: 36°51′21″N 76°16′15″W
- Area: less than one acre
- Built: c. 1903
- Architect: Albert F. Huntt (attributed to)
- Architectural style: Early Commercial
- NRHP reference No.: 09000690
- VLR No.: 122-0658

Significant dates
- Added to NRHP: September 3, 2009
- Designated VLR: June 18, 2009

American Cigar Company are two historic cigar factory buildings located at Norfolk, Virginia. The buildings were built about 1903 and consist of a stemmery and the boiler room. Albert F. Huntt is credited as the architect. The American Cigar Co. was created in 1901 as a subsidiary of the American Tobacco Company. It was listed on the National Register of Historic Places in 2009.

The stemmery is a four-story, rectangular brick building on a concrete foundation. It has a flat roof and corbelled cornice. The boiler room building is a two-story, three-bay, brick building on a brick foundation.
