= Randolph Gohi =

French footballer (born 1969)

Randolph Gohi is a French former professional footballer who played as a midfielder. Gohi was in the Racing Paris youth team that won the Coupe Gambardella in 1987. He made 12 appearances in Ligue 1 for Racing Paris in the 1986–87 season and in the 1989–90 season and 52 appearances scoring three goals in Ligue 2 for La Roche VF in the 1988–89 season and FC Martigues in the 1990–91 season. An injury at the age of 21 halted his professional football career.
