= Randolph Stewart =

Randolph Stewart may refer to:

- Randolph Stewart, 13th Earl of Galloway (1928–2020)
- Randolph Stewart, 9th Earl of Galloway (1800–1873)
- Randolph Stewart, 12th Earl of Galloway (1892–1978)
- Randolph Stewart, 11th Earl of Galloway (1836–1920)
- Randy Stewart (born 1951), American sports shooter
