= Randy (disambiguation) =

Randy is a given name, usually masculine.

Randy may also refer to:

- Randy (album), a 1964 album by Randy Weston
- Randy (band), a Swedish punk rock band
- Iban Iyanga, Equatorial Guinean footballer better known as Randy
- Randy, an English slang adjective for being in a state of sexual arousal
- Randy, a song by Justice from the 2016 album Woman

== See also ==
- Randi (disambiguation)
