= Fort Randolph (Panama) =

Former Major US Base

Coordinates: 9°23′4″N 79°53′16″W

Fort Randolph in Panama was a Coast Artillery Corps fort built to defend the northern end of the Panama Canal in conjunction with Fort Sherman.

== History ==
Fort Randolph was built on Margarita Island which had been connected to the mainland by a railway causeway, so that the eastern breakwater of Bahía Limón could be built. Like most of the Panama forts, construction began in 1913 and the breakwater was complete in 1916. The fort itself was completed on 9 April 1920 and named after Major General Wallace F. Randolph. After World War I, emplacements were added for the M1920 railway guns. These emplacements were located east of Battery Tidball.

== Batteries ==
The following batteries were built on the fort.

- Tidball, four -12-inch mortars, (John C. Tidball)
- Zalinski, four -12-inch mortars
- Webb, two 14-inch Disappearing gun
- Weed, two 6-inch Disappearing gun
- four 75-mm guns
- four 155-mm guns
- Two emplacements for the 14-inch M1920 railway guns

== See also ==
- Coastal artillery
- List of United States Army installations in Panama
- Coco Solo
- Panama Canal Railway
- Naval Base Panama Canal Zone
