= Randolph, Richmond, Virginia =

Neighborhood of Richmond, Virginia

Coordinates: 37°32′33″N 77°27′37″W

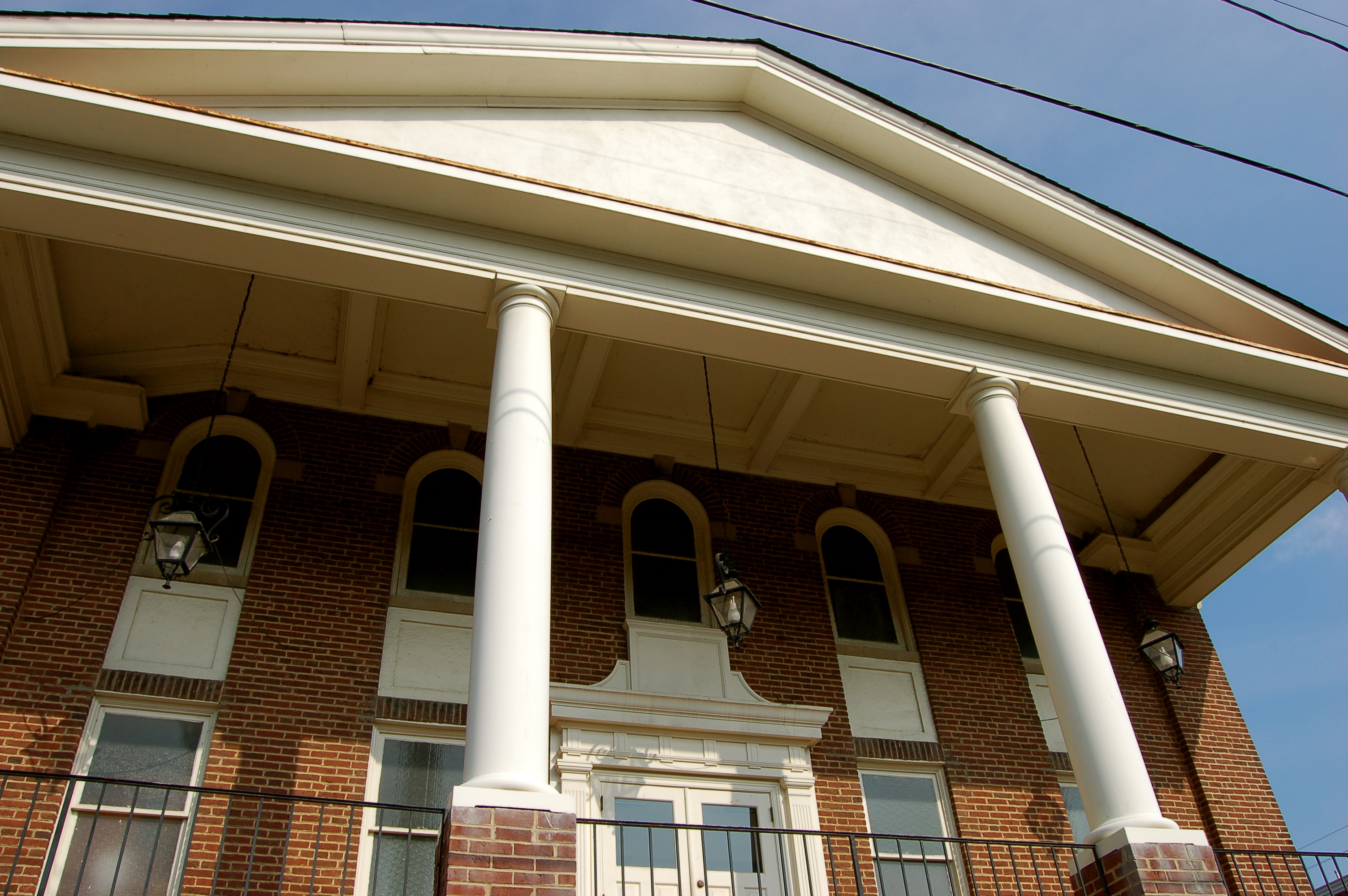
Second Baptist Church in Randolph

Randolph is a historically black middle class neighborhood located within the West End of Richmond, Virginia. The neighborhood is named in honor of Virginia E. Randolph, a former African-American educator in Henrico County, Virginia during the 19th century. The neighborhood is bounded by the Downtown Expressway to the north, Harrison Street to the east, Colorado Avenue to the south, and South Meadow street to the west. Some famous landmarks and places of interest in the neighborhood include Petronius Park, the Randolph Community Center, and just adjacent to the neighborhood, the Hollywood Cemetery.

Randolph borders Oregon Hill and the northern tier of Hollywood Cemetery directly to its east. To its south, it borders the Maymont neighborhood and River View. West of the community lies Byrd Park and Idlewood Park. Due north of the community is The Fan and the VCU Greek Row.

== See also ==
- Neighborhoods of Richmond, Virginia
- West End (Richmond, Virginia)
