= List of The Graduate School of Political Management people =

The list of The Graduate School of Political Management people includes notable graduates, professors, and administrators affiliated with The Graduate School of Political Management of the George Washington University, located in Washington, D.C.

== Alumni ==
=== Business ===
- Matt Rhoades ('99) - Founder and CEO of America Rising

=== Politics ===
- Juan Guaidó - Interim President of Venezuela
- Karen Makishima ('01) - Representative of the Kanagawa 17th District, House of Representatives, National Diet of Japan
- Stephanie Schriock ('97) - President of EMILY's List, Campaign Manager Al Franken for Senate, Campaign Manager Jon Tester for Senate

== Faculty ==
=== Current faculty ===
==== Administration ====
- Lara Brown - Director of the Graduate School of Political Management
- Mary Landrieu - Three-term United States Senator and current Senior Policy Advisor at Van Ness Feldman

==== Faculty ====
- Louis Caldera - American politician former Director of the White House Military Office, United States Secretary of the Army and California State Assemblyman
- Peter Fenn - Political strategist, consultant, television commentator and owner of Fenn Communications Group, a political and public affairs media firm based in Washington
- Mike Fernandez - American business executive and communications officer
- Martin Frost - American politician and former Congressman, member of the House Democratic Leadership, Chair of the Democratic Congressional Campaign Committee, and Chair of the House Democratic Caucus
- Dan Maffei - American politician, professor and United States Representative for New York's 24th congressional district from 2013 to 2015
- Brian Pomper - American lawyer and head of Law and policy practice at Akin Gump Strauss Hauer & Feld
- Christopher Shank - American politician and Executive Director of the Maryland Governor's Office of Crime Control and Prevention since 2015
- Terry Sullivan - American political consultant and strategist
- Cheryl W. Thompson - American reporter and investigative journalist
- Evan Tracey - American Media and Public Affairs Executive
- Ehsan Zaffar - American civil rights advocate, educator, policymaker and the founder of the Los Angeles Mobile Legal Aid Clinic (LAMLAC)

==== Fellows ====
- Eric Cantor - Former member of the House Republican leadership team, House Majority Leader and current Vice Chair and Managing Director at Moelis & Company
- Bob Carr - Member of the U.S. House of Representatives from 1975-1981 and 1983-1995
- Albert Wynn - U.S. Representative for Maryland's 4th District from 1993 to 2008 and current senior director at the international law firm Greenberg Traurig’s Washington, DC office

==== Former fellows ====
Former fellows of GSPM include:

- Maria Cardona - Principal at Dewey Square Group
- Kent Conrad - Former U.S. Senator
- Arancha Gonzalez - Executive Director of the International Trade Centre
- Barry Jackson - Former Chief of Staff to House Speaker John Boehner, Strategic Advisor Brownstein Hyatt Farber Schreck
- Joe Klein - Columnist, Time Magazine
- Matt Rhoades - Founder of Definers Public Affairs
- John Shimkus - Member of U.S. House of Representatives for Illinois' 15th Congressional District
- Amy Walter - National Editor, Cook Political Report
