= Charles Rangel =

American politician (1930–2025)

Charlie Rangel
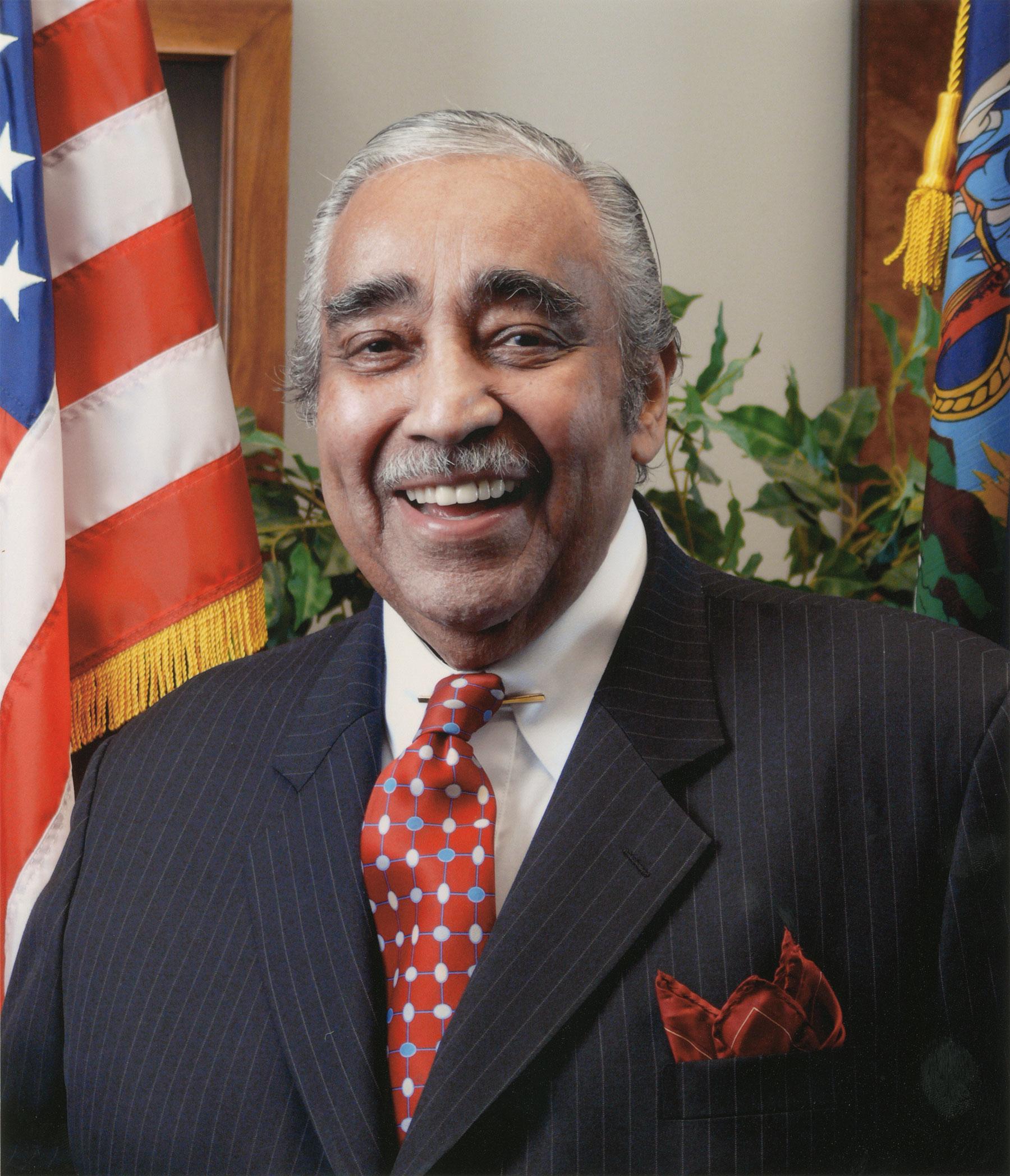
- Official portrait, 2013

Chair of the House Ways and Means Committee
- In office January 3, 2007 – March 3, 2010
- Preceded by: Bill Thomas
- Succeeded by: Pete Stark (acting)

Member of the U.S. House of Representatives from New York
- In office January 3, 1971 – January 3, 2017
- Preceded by: Adam Clayton Powell Jr.
- Succeeded by: Adriano Espaillat
- Constituency: 18th district (1971–1973); 19th district (1973–1983); 16th district (1983–1993); 15th district (1993–2013); 13th district (2013–2017)

Member of the New York State Assembly from the 72nd district
- In office January 1, 1967 – December 31, 1970
- Preceded by: Bill Green
- Succeeded by: George Miller

Personal details
- Born: Charles Bernard Rangel; June 11, 1930 New York City, New York, U.S.
- Died: May 26, 2025 (aged 94) New York City, New York, U.S.
- Resting place: Arlington National Cemetery
- Party: Democratic
- Spouse: Alma Carter (m. 1964; died 2024)
- Children: 2
- Education: New York University (BS); St. John's University (LLB)

Military service
- Branch: United States Army
- Service years: 1948–1952
- Rank: Staff Sergeant
- Unit: 503rd Artillery Battalion, 2nd Infantry Division
- Battles/wars: Korean War; Battle of Kunu-ri (WIA)
- Awards: Bronze Star with valor; Purple Heart
- Rangel's voice Rangel on his bipartisan friendships with retiring members of the 109th United States Congress. Recorded December 6, 2006

Charles Bernard Rangel (/ˈræŋɡəl/ RANG-gəl; June 11, 1930 – May 26, 2025) was an American politician who served as U.S. representative for districts in New York City for 46 years. A member of the Democratic Party, he was the second-longest serving incumbent member of the House of Representatives at the time of his retirement in 2017, having served continuously since 1971, and the ninth-longest serving in history. As its most senior member, he was also the dean of New York's congressional delegation. Rangel was the first African American chair of the influential House Ways and Means Committee. He was also a founding member of the Congressional Black Caucus.

Rangel was born in Harlem in Upper Manhattan. He earned a Purple Heart and a Bronze Star for his service in the United States Army during the Korean War, where he led a group of soldiers out of a deadly Chinese Army encirclement during the Battle of Kunu-ri in 1950. Rangel graduated from New York University in 1957 and St. John's University School of Law in 1960. He worked as a private lawyer, assistant U.S. attorney, and legal counsel during the early-mid-1960s. He served two terms in the New York State Assembly from 1967 to 1971 and defeated long-time incumbent Congressman Adam Clayton Powell Jr. in a primary challenge on his way to being elected to the House of Representatives.

Rangel rose rapidly in the Democratic ranks in the House, combining solidly liberal views with a pragmatic style that allowed him to find political and legislative compromises. His long-time concern with the importation and effects of illegal drugs led to his becoming chair of the House Select Committee on Narcotics, where he helped define national policy on the issue during the 1980s. As one of Harlem's "Gang of Four", he also became a leader in New York City and State politics. Rangel played a significant role in the creation of the 1995 Upper Manhattan Empowerment Zone Development Corporation and the national Empowerment Zone Act. Rangel was known both for what was his genial manner and his blunt speaking; he was long outspoken about his views and was arrested several times as part of political demonstrations. He was a strong opponent of the George W. Bush administration and the Iraq War, and he put forth proposals to reinstate the draft during the 2000s.

Beginning in 2008, Rangel faced allegations that he had violated House ethics rules and failed to abide by tax laws. The House Ethics Committee considered whether Rangel improperly rented multiple rent-stabilized New York apartments, improperly used his office in raising money for the Rangel Center at the City College of New York, and failed to disclose rental income from his villa in the Dominican Republic. In March 2010, Rangel stepped aside as the Ways and Means chair. In November 2010, the Ethics Committee found Rangel guilty of 11 counts of violating House ethics rules, and on December 2, 2010, the full House approved a sanction of censure against him. As his district became more Hispanic, Rangel faced two strong primary challengers during the 2012 and 2014 elections, but he nonetheless prevailed. He did not run for re-election in 2016 and left office in January 2017.

== Early life, military service, and education ==
Rangel was born in Harlem in New York City on June 11, 1930. His father, Ralph Rangel, was from Puerto Rico and came to New York in 1914, while his African American mother, Blanche Mary Wharton Rangel, was from New York City and had family roots in Virginia. (Note: Rangel's maternal African American heritage featured some tolerated miscegenation having occurred in the rural Virginia past: Rangel's great-great-grandfather was white. See Rangel, And I Haven't Had a Bad Day Since, pp. 1–2. In Puerto Rican circles in New York, Rangel's father was long thought to have been a Puerto Rican. Rangel's congressional staff denied that this is a certainty, saying that Rangel never knew his father and knew only that he came from a town in southern Virginia, and that Rangel did not deny the possibility that his father was originally from Puerto Rico. See Dávila, Arlene M. (2004). Barrio Dreams: Puerto Ricans, Latinos, and the Neoliberal City. University of California Press. p. 218. ISBN 0-520-24093-6. Rangel's purported partial Puerto Rican heritage was alluded to by Herman Badillo during multi-way ethnic mudslinging among New York politicos late in the 1993 mayoral election. See Mitchell, Alison (October 6, 1993). "Giuliani Ads Accuse Dinkins of Using Race Issue". The New York Times. By 2012, however, Rangel and his wife were acknowledging that his father was from Puerto Rico, although he declined to speak much about his father due to a lifelong hatred.) Charles was the second of three children, with an older brother Ralph Jr. and a younger sister Frances. Ralph Rangel sometimes worked as a laborer in a garage, but he was mostly a frequently absent, unemployed man who was abusive to his wife and who left the family when Charles was six years old. Charles was raised by his mother, who worked as a maid and as a seamstress in a factory in New York's Garment District, and by his maternal grandfather. Many summers were spent in Accomac, Virginia, where his maternal family had roots. Charles was brought up as a Catholic.

Rangel did well in elementary and middle school, and he began working at a neighborhood drug store at the age of eight. Rangel attended DeWitt Clinton High School, but he was often truant and was sometimes driven home by the police. His maternal grandfather, an early role model who worked in a courthouse and knew many judges and lawyers, kept him from getting into more serious trouble. Rangel dropped out at the age of sixteen during his junior year and worked in various low-paying jobs including selling shoes.

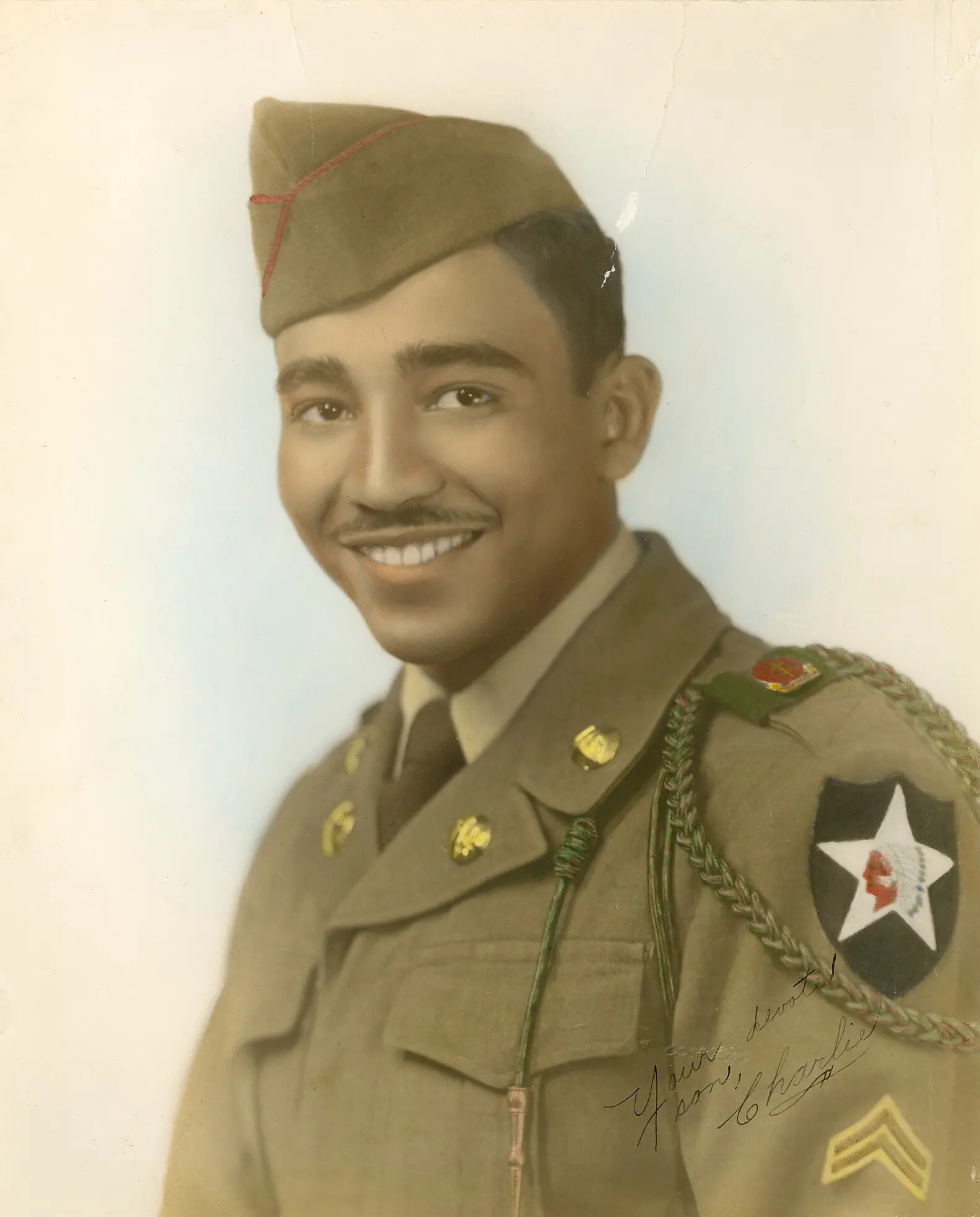
Rangel in his U.S. Army uniform, 1950

Rangel then enlisted in the United States Army and served from 1948 to 1952. During the Korean War he was an artillery operations specialist in the all-Black 503rd Field Artillery Battalion in the 2nd Infantry Division, and equipped with the 155 mm Howitzer M1. (While President Harry S. Truman had signed the order to desegregate the military in 1948, little progress in doing so had been made during peacetime, and the large majority of units initially sent to Korea were still segregated.) Rangel's unit arrived in Pusan, South Korea, in August 1950 and began moving north as U.N. forces advanced deep into North Korea.

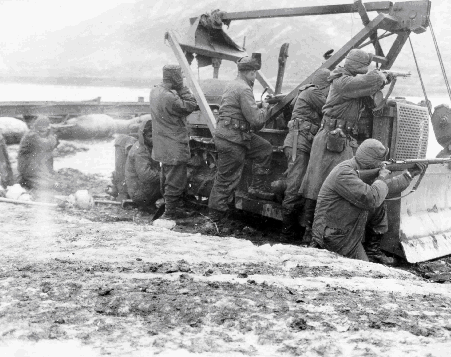
A 2nd Infantry Division unit near Rangel's, fighting a rear-guard action in the Battle of Kunu-ri, in November 1950, during the Korean War

In late November 1950, after the People's Republic of China intervention into the war, his unit was caught in heavy fighting in North Korea as part of the U.N. forces retreat from the Yalu River. In the Battle of the Ch'ongch'on River, the 2nd Infantry was assigned to hold a road position near Kunu-ri while the rest of the Eighth Army retreated to Sunchon, 21 miles farther south. On the night of November 29, the 2nd Infantry was attacked by gradually encircling forces of the PRC Army, who set up a fireblock to cut off any U.S. retreat. The eerie blare of Chinese night-fighting bugle calls and communication flares piercing the freezing air led to what Rangel later described as a "waking nightmare, scene by scene, and we couldn't see any possible way out of the situation". During the day on November 30, the order came to withdraw the 2nd Infantry in phases, but the 503rd Artillery Battalion was sixth of eight in the order and could not get out in daylight when air cover was possible.

On the night of November 30, Rangel was part of a retreating vehicle column that was trapped and attacked by Chinese forces. In the subzero cold Rangel was hit in the back by shrapnel from a Chinese shell. He later wrote that the blast threw him into a ditch, causing him to pray fervently to Jesus. Up and down the line of the retreat, unit cohesion disappeared under attack and officers lost contact with their men. There was screaming and moaning around him and some U.S. soldiers were being taken prisoner, but despite feeling overwhelming fear Rangel resolved to try to escape over an imposing mountain: "From the rim of that gully it just looked like everything had to be better on the other side of that damn mountain."

Others nearby looked to Rangel who, though only a private first class, had a reputation for leadership in the unit and had gained the nickname "Sarge". Rangel led some 40 men from his unit over the mountain during the night and out of the Chinese encirclement. Other groups were trying to do the same, but some men dropped from the severe conditions or got lost and were never heard from again. By midday on December 1, U.S. aircraft were dropping supplies and directions to Rangel's group and others, and had a raft ready to take them across the Taedong River; groups from the 503rd Artillery reached Sunchon that afternoon. Overall, no part of the 2nd Infantry suffered as many casualties as the artillery. It tried to save (but eventually lost) all its guns, and nearly half of the battalion was killed in the overall battle.

Rangel was treated first at a field hospital, then moved to a general hospital well behind the lines in South Korea where he recuperated. He eventually returned to regular duty, then was rotated back to the U.S. in July 1951.

Rangel was awarded a Purple Heart for his wounds, the Bronze Star with Valor for his actions in the face of death, and three battle stars. His Army unit was awarded the Presidential Unit Citation (Note: Unit citations are given to the entire membership of the unit, not just one person, and are required to be worn by soldiers that subsequently serve in that unit.) and the Republic of Korea Presidential Unit Citation. In 2000, Rangel reflected on the experience in a CBS News interview:

Since Kunu Ri – and I mean it with all my heart, I have never, never had a bad day.

After an honorable discharge from the Army in 1952 with the rank of staff sergeant, he returned home to headlines in The New York Amsterdam News. Rangel later viewed his time in the Army, away from the poverty of his youth, as a major turning point in his life: "When I was exposed to a different life, even if that life was just the Army, I knew damn well I couldn't get back to the same life I had left."

Rangel finished high school, completing two years of studies in one year. (Note: What high school this was that Rangel graduated from by completing two years of study in one is unclear; Rangel's memoir implies that it was not DeWitt Clinton while some other sources state he got a GED. What year this occurred in is also uncertain; multiple sources state that Rangel got his high school degree in 1953, but his memoir implies that he started the process in 1953 and ended it in 1954, since it states that he went through New York University in three years not the usual four.) Benefiting from the G.I. Bill Rangel received a Bachelor of Science degree from the New York University School of Commerce in 1957, where he made the dean's list. On full scholarship, he obtained his law degree from the St. John's University School of Law in 1960.

Rangel was a member of Alpha Phi Alpha fraternity. He was also a member of the fraternity's World Policy Council, a think tank whose purpose is to expand Alpha Phi Alpha's involvement in politics and social and current policy to encompass international concerns.

== Early career ==
=== Legal ===
After finishing law school Rangel passed the state bar exam and was hired by Weaver, Evans & Wingate, a prominent black law firm. Rangel made little money in private practice, but did build a positive reputation for providing legal assistance to Black civil rights activists. In 1961, Rangel was appointed Assistant U.S. Attorney in the Southern District of New York by U.S. Attorney General Robert F. Kennedy and worked under U.S. Attorney Robert M. Morgenthau. He stayed in the position for a year.

Next Rangel was legal counsel to the New York Housing and Redevelopment Board; associate counsel to the Speaker of the New York State Assembly; a law clerk to pioneering Judge James L. Watson; and general counsel to the National Advisory Commission on Selective Service (1966), a presidential commission created to revise draft laws. His interest in politics grew.

Rangel met Alma Carter, a social worker, in the mid-late-1950s while on the dance floor of the Savoy Ballroom in Harlem. They married on July 26, 1964. They had two children, Steven and Alicia, and three grandsons.

=== Political ===
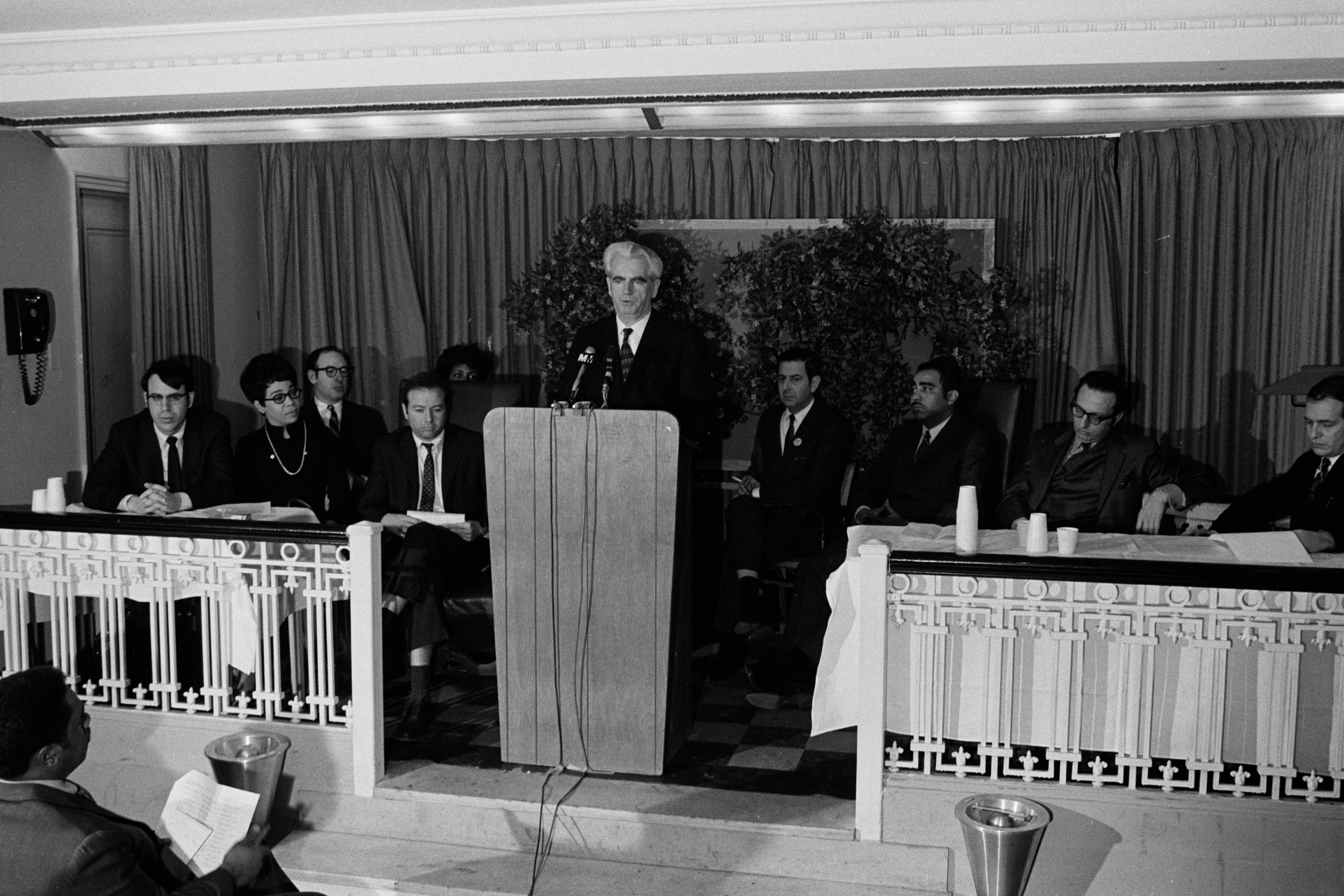
Rangel (seated, third from right) at a press conference—of Reform Democrats against the Vietnam War—at the Hotel Diplomat in New York City, April 1, 1969

Rangel ran for party district leader and lost during an intense Democratic factional dispute in Harlem in 1963. In 1964, Rangel and the man who would become his political mentor, Assemblyman Percy Sutton, merged clubs as part of forming the John F. Kennedy Democratic Club in Harlem (which later became part of the Rev. Martin Luther King Jr. Democratic Club).

Rangel participated in the 1965 Selma to Montgomery marches, marching for four days even though he had planned only a brief appearance. He developed what The New York Times would label his irrepressible energy and joking style of self-mockery during this time.

Rangel was selected in September 1966 by Harlem Democrats to run in the 72nd District for the New York State Assembly, after the incumbent Percy Sutton had been elected by the New York City Council members from Manhattan as Manhattan Borough President to fill the vacancy caused by the appointment of Constance Baker Motley as a federal judge. Rangel was victorious, serving in the 177th and 178th New York State Legislatures until 1970. He emerged as a leader among the Black legislators in the state and became politically friendly with Governor of New York Nelson Rockefeller, who arranged for Rangel to run on the Republican as well as Democratic ballot line during his 1968 re-election.

Rangel supported legalization of the numbers game, saying "For the average Harlemite, playing numbers... is moral and a way of life." He also opposed harsher penalties on prostitutes, on grounds of ineffectiveness. He was strongly concerned by the effects of drugs on Harlem, advocated that drug pushers be held accountable for the crimes committed by their users, and in general believed the problem was at the level of a threat to national security.

In 1969, Rangel ran for the Democratic nomination for New York City Council President. In a tumultuous race that featured sportswriter Jimmy Breslin as mayoral candidate Norman Mailer's running mate, Rangel came in last in a field of six candidates.

In 1970, Rangel ran for election to the U.S. House of Representatives, challenging long-time incumbent Congressman Adam Clayton Powell Jr., in the Democratic primary in New York's 18th congressional district. Powell had been an iconic, charismatic, and flamboyant figure who had become embroiled in an ethics controversy in 1967, lost his seat, and then regained it in 1969 due to the U.S. Supreme Court decision in Powell v. McCormack. In a field with five candidates Rangel focused on criticizing Powell's frequent absences from Congress. In the June primary Rangel defeated Powell by 150 votes out of around 25,000 cast. Powell tried to take legal action to overturn the result claiming over 1,000 ballots were improper votes but was unsuccessful. Powell also failed to get on the ballot as an independent. With both Democratic and Republican backing, Rangel won the November 1970 general election—against a Liberal Party candidate and several others—with 88 percent of the vote.

== U.S. House of Representatives ==
=== Districts, terms, and committees ===
Initially the strongest electoral challenge to Rangel came during his first re-election bid, in 1972, when he faced a Democratic primary challenge from HARYOU-ACT director Livingston Wingate, who had the backing of the old Powell organization and the Congress of Racial Equality, a Black nationalist group that Rangel publicly denounced. Rangel had the backing of the other Democratic power bases, however, and won the primary by a 3–to–1 margin and the general election easily.

Rangel won re-election every two years until his retirement, usually with over 90 percent of the vote and often with more than 95 percent. In a number of elections Rangel received the backing of the Democratic Party, the Republican Party, and the Liberal Party of New York. Rangel's consistent appeal to his constituents was due to the perception of him as a champion for justice not just in Harlem but elsewhere in the world. He did face a mid-career primary challenge in 1994 when two-term New York City Councilman Adam Clayton Powell IV was his opponent and held Rangel to 58 percent of the vote. Rangel then faced strong primary challenges from 2010 on during and after his ethics troubles.

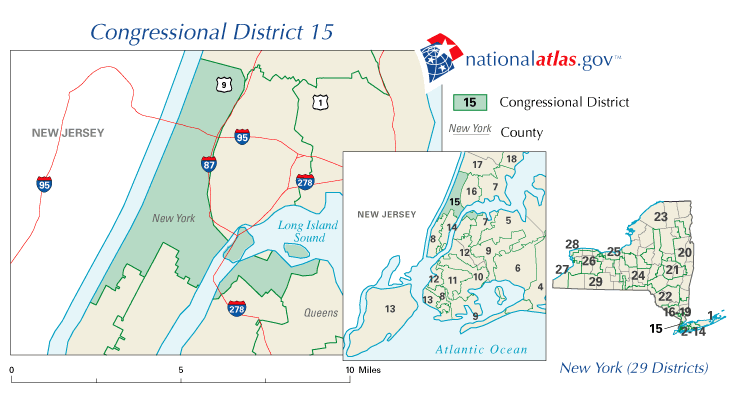
New York's 15th congressional district, which Rangel had represented until 2013

His district was numbered the Eighteenth District from 1971 to 1973; the Nineteenth District from 1973 to 1983; the Sixteenth District from 1983 to 1993; and the Fifteenth from 1993 to 2013. Early 1970s' reapportionment led to the area that Rangel represented being only 65 percent Black, and by 1979 it was 50 percent non-Hispanic Black, 30 percent white, and 20 percent Puerto Rican. By 2000, only 3 in 10 district residents were non-Hispanic Blacks, while nearly half were Hispanic, with many of the newcomers being Dominican. Subsequently, numbered the Thirteenth, Rangel's area of representation showed a 2-to-1 preponderance of Hispanics over non-Hispanic African Americans.

Rangel was an original member when the Congressional Black Caucus was formed in 1971. While serving as a member of the Congressional Black Caucus' predecessor organization the "Democratic Select Committee", Rangel proposed giving the committee the name "Congressional Black Caucus" during a meeting with other caucus members on February 2, 1971. In 1974, he was elected its chairman and he served in that role until 1976. He remained a member of the caucus for the duration of his time in office. His wife Alma was a founder and a chair of the Congressional Black Caucus Spouses, which engaged in social and fundraising activities for the Congressional Black Caucus Foundation, which in turn gave out college education grants.

Committee assignments

- Committee on Ways and Means (1975–2017; Ranking member 1996–2006; Chair 2007–2010 [leave of absence for part of 2010])
- Joint Committee on Taxation (Chair 2007, 2009; Vice Chair 2008, 2010 [until left Ways and Means chair])
- Select Committee on Narcotics Abuse and Control (1976–1993; Chair 1983–1993)
- Select Committee on Crime (1971–1973)
- Committee on the Judiciary (1971–1974)

Caucus memberships

- Congressional Black Caucus
- Congressional Progressive Caucus
- Congressional Arts Caucus
- House Democratic Caucus
- International Conservation Caucus

=== 1970s: Rapid rise ===
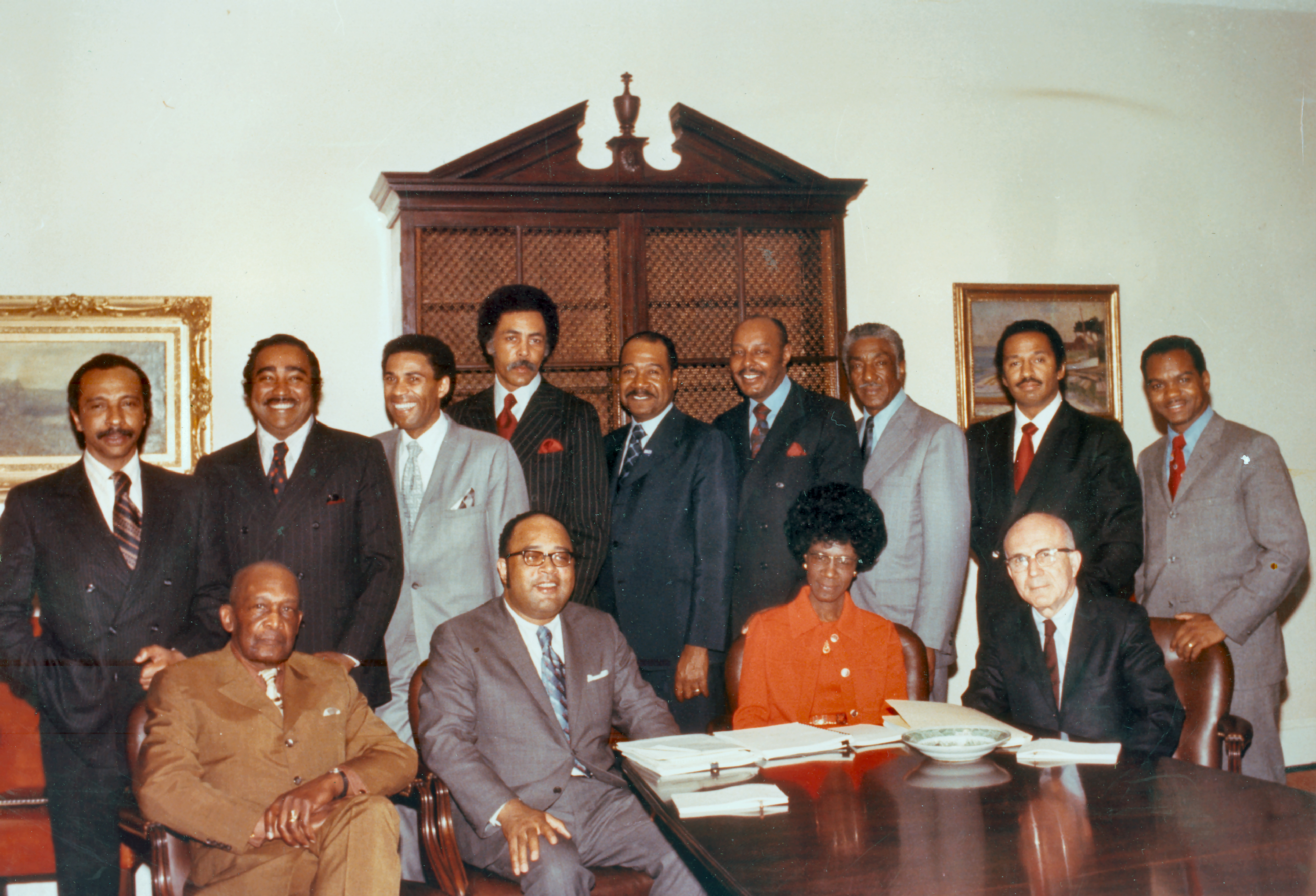
Rangel (second from left, top) with fellow founding members of the Congressional Black Caucus in 1971

As a freshman representative Rangel focused on the issue of drugs and was a member of the House Select Committee on Crime. In February 1971, he criticized the Nixon administration for not taking stronger action against Turkey and France, the source and manufacture points for most of the heroin coming into the U.S. His proposal to halt foreign aid to countries not cooperating in the effort against international drug trafficking was unsuccessful, but led to a bill authorizing the president to reduce aid to those countries. Rangel created controversy in New York City by accusing some members of the New York Police Department of cooperating with drug pushers.

On April 14, 1972, Rangel and Louis Farrakhan interfered in the investigation of the murder of New York Police Department patrolman Philip Cardillo, who was fatally shot in a Harlem Nation of Islam mosque where Malcolm X used to preach. Before a suspect could be taken into custody, Farrakhan and Rangel arrived at the scene, saying a riot would likely occur if the suspect and others were not released. Some police department officials also limited the investigation, including deputy commissioner for public affairs Benjamin Ward, who had ordered all white officers away from the scene in acquiescing to the demands of Farrakhan and Rangel.

Despite an initial impression that Rangel was mostly concerned with the "ghetto problems" of drugs and welfare, Rangel focused on many other issues. He consistently backed Israel, including objecting to an anti-Israeli resolution adopted at the National Black Political Convention in 1972 and urging Black Americans to support the civil rights of Soviet Jews in 1975. In other respects Rangel opposed foreign interventions and military spending, voting against bombing in Cambodia, and against funding for the B-1 bomber and supercarriers.

In Congress one of Rangel's first committee assignments was on the House Judiciary Committee; during the Watergate scandal he participated in the 1974 impeachment process against Richard Nixon. Rangel received both national attention and respect for his well-informed questioning style during the hearings. Rangel was also prominent in questioning Governor Rockefeller on his role in handling the Attica Prison riot during Rockefeller's vice presidential confirmation hearing.

Rangel rose rapidly in the House, due to his political skills, hard work, knowledge of legislative matters, and genial manner. In 1974, he became the first African American ever named to the House Committee on Ways and Means, a position he assumed in 1975 (and left the Judiciary Committee) and by 1979 had become the chairman of its important Subcommittee on Health. In 1976, he was named to the House Select Committee on Narcotics Abuse and Control. By 1979, he was a member of the influential House Democratic Steering and Policy Committee. He combined his solidly liberal views–interest group ratings in 1978 indicated he was the most liberal member of the New York State congressional delegation–with a pragmatic approach towards finding political and legislative compromises. Rangel built alliances with others in Congress (collaborating for example with Michigan Republican Guy Vander Jagt on welfare reform measures), with people in governmental agencies, and with the Carter administration. In some cases Rangel was criticized for being too pragmatic, such as when he switched his position on the deregulation of natural gas; Rangel denied that he did so in exchange for the authorization of a new federal building in Harlem. Rangel said of himself, "I guess I'm practical, but you have to live with yourself and make sure you are not so practical that you sell out a part of yourself."

Besides his increasing influence in Washington, by the late 1970s Rangel was New York City's leading Black political figure. After initially endorsing Percy Sutton in the 1977 mayoral election, he endorsed Ed Koch over Mario Cuomo in the Democratic primary run-off. He attempted to mediate between Mayor Koch and some minority groups who thought the Koch administration racially insensitive. As Koch related, "He has told some Blacks angry with me: 'You say Ed Koch is nasty to you? I want you to know he's nasty to everybody.' I thought that was rather nice."

=== 1980s: Influential figure ===
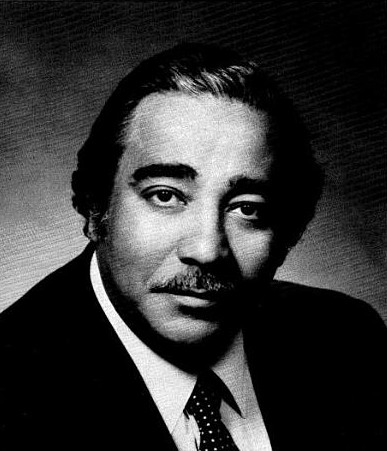
Official portrait, 1985

In 1981, Rangel became chairman of the Ways and Means Subcommittee on Oversight giving him power in attempting to oppose the Reagan administration's cuts in social spending. By 1983 he was the third-ranking member on Ways and Means, and worked well with its powerful chairman, Dan Rostenkowski. Rangel became a protégé of Speaker of the House Tip O'Neill who made him Deputy Majority Whip later that year. In the 1984 United States presidential election, Rangel supported former Vice President Walter Mondale rather than the primary campaign of Jesse Jackson.

By that time Rangel was known as one of the "Gang of Four", who along with his old mentor Percy Sutton, city and state figure Basil A. Paterson, and future mayor David Dinkins were the most prominent politicians in Harlem. They broke racial barriers, attained offices once viewed as not possible for Black Americans to achieve, and paved the way for many others around the nation. As power brokers they would dominate public life in Harlem for a generation.

Rangel endorsed Koch for re-election in 1981; by 1983 his relationship with the mayor had fallen apart: "I don't know anybody in politics that I dislike enough that I would recommend that he sit down with the mayor." By 1984 Rangel was the most influential Black politician in New York State. His position on Ways and Means allowed him to bring federal monies to the state and city for transit projects, industrial development, Medicare needs, low-income housing, and shelters for the homeless. Rangel was one of the city's most recognizable politicians and there was speculation that he would run for mayor in 1985, but Rangel preferred to remain in the House, with the goal of eventually becoming Ways and Means chairman and in the best case scenario even House Speaker. Indeed, Rangel never showed any interest in a different political job other than being the Congressman from Harlem. Such was his association with it that he became known as the "Lion of Lenox Avenue" within the neighborhood.

In 1983, Rangel became chair of the Select Committee on Narcotics solidifying his position as a leading strategist on an issue perennially important to him. Rangel kept the committee going in the face of usual pressure to disband special committees. He battled against proposed cutbacks in the federal anti-drug budget, advocating for increased grants to states and cities for better shelters for the homeless. Rangel's amendments providing increased funding for state and local law enforcement and were included in the Anti-Drug Abuse Act of 1986. He traveled to countries in Central and South America and other places to inspect the sources of drugs and the law enforcement efforts against them; Ebony magazine termed Rangel "a front-line general in the war against drugs." Rangel said "We need outrage!", making reference to the slow reaction by both government and religious leaders to the epidemics of crack cocaine, heroin, PCP, and other drugs that hit American streets during the 1980s. He believed that legalizing drugs would represent "moral and political suicide". He did not refrain from criticizing those most affected by drugs, saying that Hispanic and Black teenagers had no sense of self-preservation, and that drug dealers were so stupid they had to eat in fast-food places because they could not read a menu. By 1988, Rangel was saying that President Ronald Reagan had not done enough in the war on drugs, but that First Lady Nancy Reagan's "Just Say No" campaign had been quite valuable. The narcotics committee itself was termed possibly the most important select committee of its time. The Washington Post said Rangel was "in a powerful position to shape policy on an issue at the top of the nation's agenda". He would remain as chair of the committee through 1993, when it was abolished along with other House select committees.

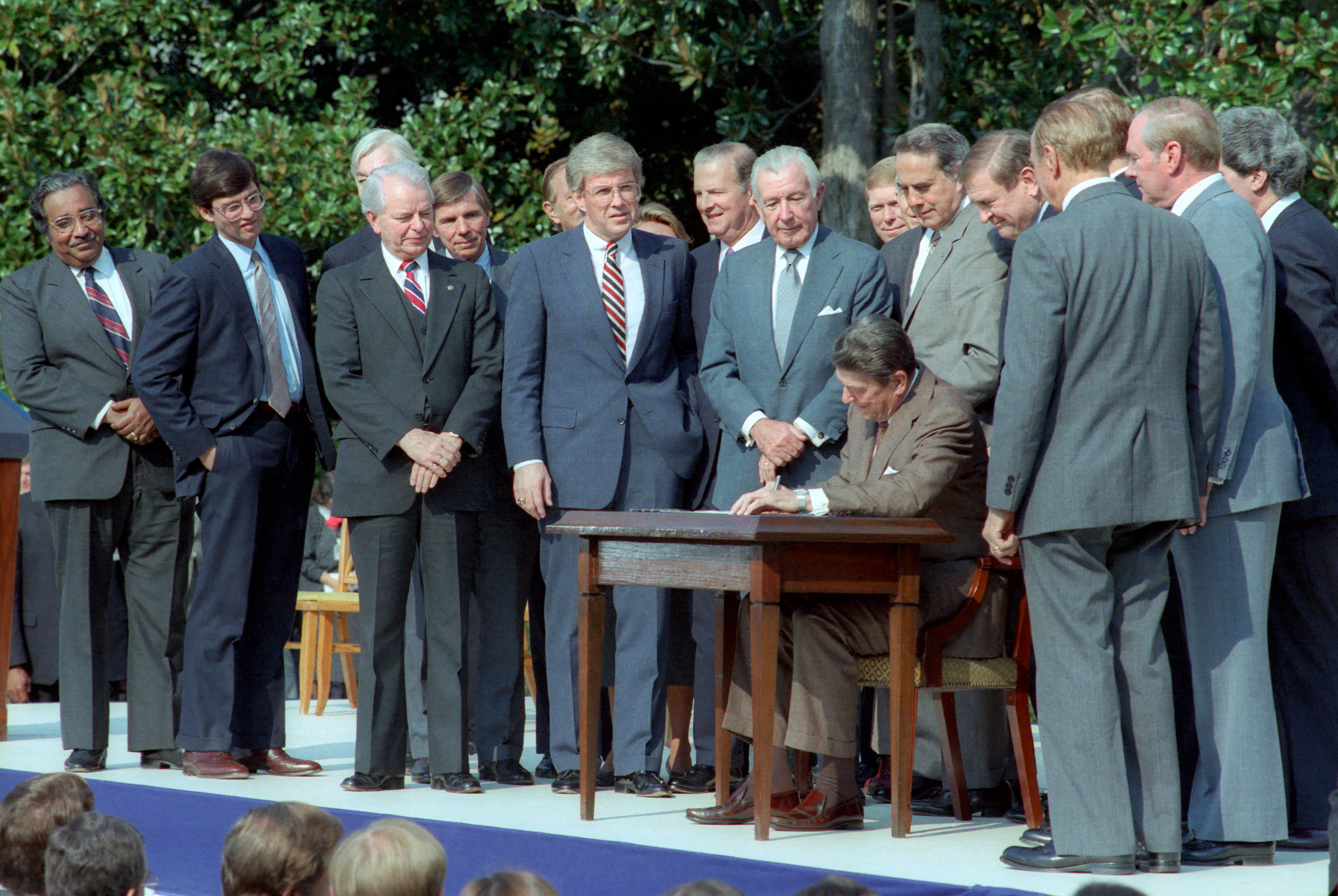
Rangel (far left) looks on as President Ronald Reagan signs the Tax Reform Act of 1986 on the White House South Lawn.

Rangel was part of the House–Senate joint conference that worked on the Tax Reform Act of 1986, a simplifying overhaul that constituted the most sweeping reform of the U.S. tax code in 50 years. In the negotiations Rangel successfully argued for dropping more lower-income people from the tax rolls; the elimination of six million households from federal income taxation was hailed as a wise policy by both liberal and conservative groups. Rangel authored the Low-Income Housing Tax Credit portion of the bill, which increased affordable housing in the U.S. He also played a key role in preserving the deductibility of state and local income taxes. He asserted that while beneficiaries of tax reform were not well organized, business interests opposed to it were. When the conference threatened to break down, he stressed it was vital to reach an agreement.

By late 1985 Rangel was in a six-person race to become the next House Majority Whip, the third-highest ranked position in the House and for the first time up for election by the members rather than appointment by the Speaker. In October 1986 the race was heating up, with Rangel as the underdog coming close to Representative Tony Coelho from California through use of his personal skills and Rangel arguing that the Democratic leadership needed better regional balance. However, in December 1986, Coelho defeated Rangel in the vote for whip, 167–78. Rangel attributed his loss to Coelho having funded the campaigns of many House members via his role as chairman of the Democratic Congressional Campaign Committee, later saying, "I had never been so goddamn naive. I came to Washington as an experienced politician. How did I miss Coelho's contribution to members?"

In December 1984, Rangel was arrested for participating in an anti-apartheid rally in front of the South African Consulate in New York. Rangel successfully pushed to have foreign tax credits removed for corporations doing business in that country, a 1987 act that became known as the "Rangel Amendment". A number of companies left South Africa as a result, and the amendment proved to be one of the more effective anti-apartheid sanctions. The bill won praise from Nelson Mandela and Rangel later said was one of his actions that he was most proud of.

=== 1990s: Support and opposition ===
During the 1991 Gulf War, Rangel demanded that Chairman of the Joint Chiefs of Staff Colin Powell investigate allegations of discrimination from Black members of the New York Army National Guard regarding combat training and treatment. During the Clinton administration, Rangel battled with executive branch officials over budget items almost as much as he had during Republican administrations, and always resented when Clinton negotiated directly with Republicans while bypassing congressional Democrats. In 1993, however, Rangel was a key sponsor of increases to the Earned Income Tax Credit that passed.

Rangel's dream of becoming chairman of Ways and Means took a tumble with the Republican Revolution of 1994, which took control of the House away from the Democrats for the first time in decades. He did become the ranking Democrat of the committee in 1996. Rangel was bitterly opposed to the Republican Contract With America, considering it an assault on America's poor, and strongly criticized Democrats such as President Bill Clinton and religious leaders such as John Cardinal O'Connor for perpetuating "the silence of good people" that he likened to what happened in Nazi Germany. When Rangel made a similar allusion directed at new Ways and Means chair Bill Archer in 1995, Archer refused to speak to him for several years except at public meetings. Rangel also strongly opposed the Welfare Reform Act of 1996, accusing Clinton of supporting it for political reasons and predicting its consequences would cast a million children into poverty.

Opening up economic opportunities for minorities and the poor was a focus of Rangel's during the 1990s. His 1993 legislation created "empowerment zones", which provided tax incentives for investment and job creation in inner urban areas; it would eventually account for $5 billion in federal spending across the nation's cities. Rangel played a specific role in the creation of the 1995 Upper Manhattan Empowerment Zone Development Corporation, which led to a $500 million spending of public and private monies towards changing the face of Harlem, including gentrification effects. Rangel served on the corporation's board, and the effort was credited with helping the resurgence of Harlem that took place during the 1990s. The revival of the Apollo Theater in the 1990s was an instance of Rangel's empowerment zones improving the cultural aspect of Harlem.

During the late 1990s, Rangel led an outreach effort on behalf of the Democratic Congressional Campaign Committee that sought to gain African American votes for white candidates in key swing districts. The project may have helped gain or keep several seats during the 1998 mid-term House elections.

In late 1998, when long-time Senator Daniel Patrick Moynihan of New York announced his retirement, Rangel was one of the first to advocate that First Lady Hillary Clinton move to New York and run for the seat. She did so successfully.

On March 15, 1999, the congressman was arrested along with two other prominent African American leaders (civil rights activist Al Sharpton and former Mayor David Dinkins) for protesting the fatal shooting of Amadou Diallo, a 23-year-old immigrant to the United States from Guinea, by four white and Hispanic New York City police officers. The officers involved were later acquitted by a mixed-race jury.

In October 1998, New York State Attorney General Dennis Vacco filed a lawsuit charging the directors of the foundation behind New York's Apollo Theater, including foundation chair Rangel, with failing to collect more than $4 million owed it by a company controlled by Percy Sutton that produced the television program It's Showtime at the Apollo. The suit sought the removal of Rangel; after months of indecision, Rangel stepped down as chair but remained on the board. In October 1999, new Attorney General Eliot Spitzer dismissed the lawsuit and cleared Rangel and Sutton of any wrongdoing, saying that all monies properly owed had changed hands. Rangel expressed bitterness over the year-long episode, saying "I shouldn't have had to go through this."

=== 2000–2007: Protest and power ===
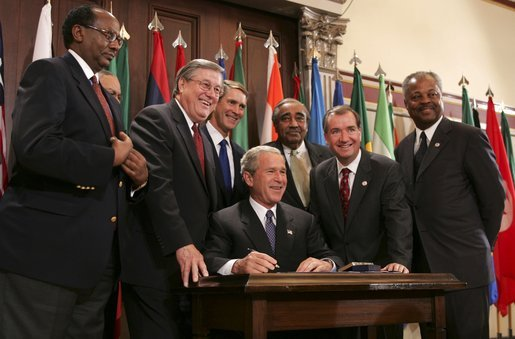
Rangel (third from right) looks on as President George W. Bush signs an extension to the African Growth and Opportunity Act in 2004.

During the early 2000s Rangel advocated continued funding of anti-poverty efforts, including Temporary Assistance for Needy Families and Child care and development block grant. Rangel also had an unproductive relationship with Ways and Means chairman Bill Thomas, leading to an incident in which Thomas called the United States Capitol Police on Rangel for having his members read a bill in the library, an action for which Thomas apologized.

Rangel sponsored the African Growth and Opportunity Act, passed in 2000, despite the opposition of labor unions, the textile industry, and the Congressional Black Caucus. For the first time incentives were provided for U.S. trade with sub-Saharan Africa. Indeed, Rangel became known for his support of free trade agreements, in contrast to many of his fellow House Democrats.

Following the September 11 attacks, Rangel helped secure an extension to unemployment benefits. His intent was to help those in New York industries affected by the events.

Motivated by seeing few African American diplomats on his trips abroad, he founded the Charles B. Rangel International Affairs Fellowship Program in 2002. The program is a collaboration between Howard University and the U.S. State Department that has significantly increased the number of minorities working in the U.S. Foreign Service.

In July 2004, Rangel was the first of three sitting U.S. House members to be arrested on trespassing charges, for protesting human rights abuses in Sudan in front of the Sudanese Embassy in Washington (Bobby Rush and Joe Hoeffel would follow). Rangel said, "When human lives are in jeopardy, there should be outrage."

Rangel was an adamant opponent of the George W. Bush administration and of the Iraq War. Feeling powerless to stop the latter in the Republican-controlled Congress, he said in 2007 that he had suffered from nightmares: "It was my lowest point ever in my 37 years in Congress ... It was a sad period where you saw lives being lost [in the war] and you couldn't do anything about it." In April 2006, Rangel and nine other representatives joined John Conyers' action against George W. Bush and others, alleging violations of the U.S. Constitution in the passing of the Deficit Reduction Act of 2005. Conyers v. Bush was dismissed later that year for lack of standing.

Rangel was long opposed to the all-volunteer army and repeatedly called for the government to bring back the draft (military conscription). In 2003, Rangel said that "A disproportionate number of the poor and members of minority groups make up the enlisted ranks of the military, while the most privileged Americans are underrepresented or absent", and that a draft would make the military more representative of the American public at large. While some observers saw the logic in what Rangel was saying, his proposals attracted little organized support from either party or from antiwar organizations. During 2006 Rangel said that no soldier would be fighting in Iraq if they had decent career possibilities and stating:

There's no question in my mind that this president and this administration would never have invaded Iraq, especially on the flimsy evidence that was presented to the Congress, if indeed we had a draft and members of Congress and the administration thought that their kids from their communities would be placed in harm's way.

Rangel introduced versions of his Universal National Service Act in the House in 2003, 2006, 2007, and 2010. Polls showed 70 percent of Americans opposed a reinstatement of the draft. Rangel emphasized that people could fulfill their draft obligations through non-military services, such as port and airline security. The one time the act came up for a vote in the full House, in 2004, it was defeated 2–402, with Rangel voting against his own bill in protest at the procedural handling of it.

In June 2006, the House Appropriations Committee passed a $3 million earmark to establish the Charles B. Rangel Center for Public Service at City College of New York. By 2007 the amount had been reduced to $2 million, but the funding for the center, whose purpose was to bring more poor and minority students into politics, was the target of criticism from Representative John Campbell of California and other Republicans as an abuse of the earmark process and as Rangel's "Monument to Me". City College said it was proud to house the center and Rangel said "I cannot think of anything I am more proud of."

In August 2006, Rangel said he would resign his seat if the Democrats did not take the House that November, a statement that had real intent behind it, as at age 76 Rangel was feeling "the claustrophobia" of time.

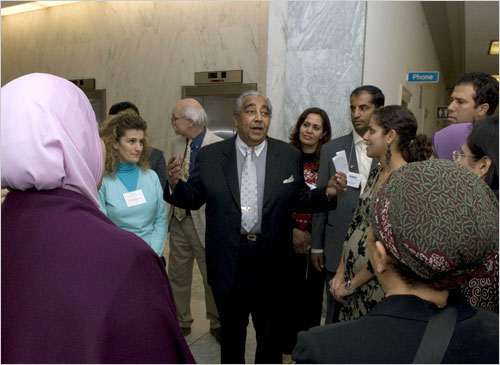
Rangel speaks to international educators visiting the U.S. Capitol in 2007 under the U.S. Department of State's Global Connections and Exchange Program

The Democrats did take control and in January 2007, Rangel's long wait to head the Ways and Means Committee was over. Not only was he the first African American to do so, but he was also the first New Yorker to chair the committee since Fernando Wood in the 1870s. As holder of one of the most powerful posts in Congress, he said the chairmanship "couldn't have come any later for me". Age was not otherwise a factor with Rangel, who worked a scheduled 16 hours a day and looked a good deal younger than he was. Ebony magazine termed Rangel's ascent to the chairmanship "a watershed moment for African-Americans, who historically have been shut out when it comes to deciding how to divvy up the trillions of dollars in the federal government's budget". Rangel was able to establish an effective working relationship with ranking member Jim McCrery.

In April 2007, Rangel published his autobiography, ... And I Haven't Had a Bad Day Since: From the Streets of Harlem to the Halls of Congress, whose title reflected his experience in Korea. The New York Times gave it a favorable reviewing, saying it was "mercifully short on laundry lists [that some other political memoirs have], but long on sass and spirit".

Rangel was an early and strong supporter of Hillary Clinton's 2008 presidential campaign for the Democratic nomination. His actions during 2007 included taking a shot at the marital histories of former Mayor of New York Rudy Giuliani, then the Republican front-runner, and his wife Judith Giuliani, resulted in Rangel issuing a no-excuses apology. As events in 2008 unwound, the Democratic primaries and caucuses turned into a historic battle between Clinton and Senator Barack Obama. Although Obama had a real chance of becoming the first African American president, a development that Rangel viewed with pride, and although some racially tinged comments entered the contest and Clinton's support among African Americans plunged, Rangel stayed loyal to her, saying "There's just no question in my mind that Hillary would be in a better position than a freshman senator. This ain't no time for a beginner." (Rangel's wife Alma, on the other hand, publicly supported Obama.) Rangel did endorse Obama once he finally clinched the nomination in early June 2008.

=== 2008–2010: Ethics issues and censure ===
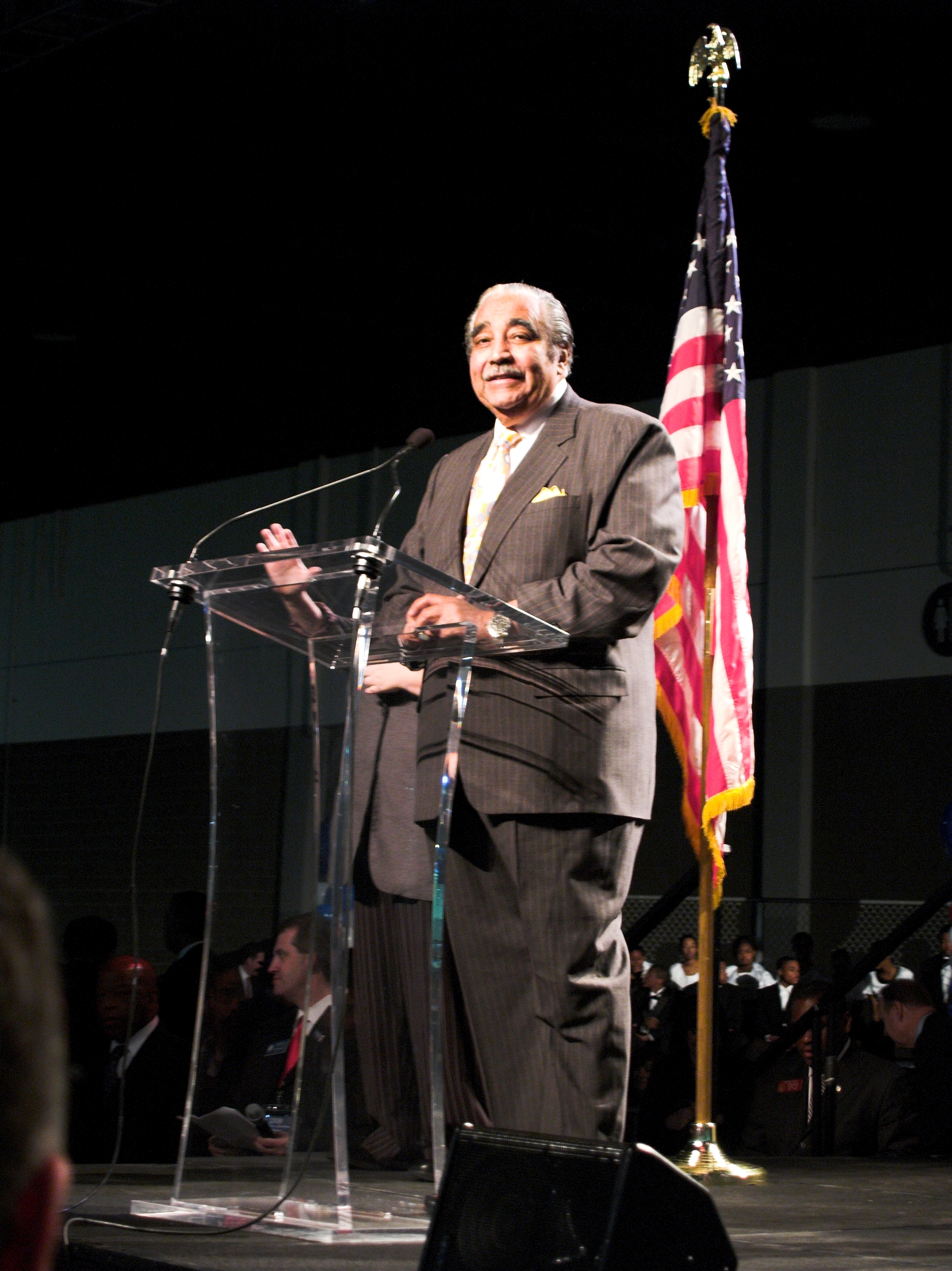
Rangel speaking in 2008

==== Letterhead use and Rangel Center fundraising ====
In July 2008, The Washington Post reported that Rangel was soliciting donations to the Charles B. Rangel Center for Public Service at City College of New York from corporations with business interests before his Ways and Means Committee, and was doing so using Congressional letterhead. The companies and individuals included AIG, Donald Trump, and Nabors Industries, and by this time Rangel's efforts had helped raise $12 million of the $30 million goal for the center. Government watchdog groups and ethics experts criticized Rangel's actions, with the dean of the George Washington University Graduate School of Political Management saying Rangel "has crossed the line".

Rangel denied any wrongdoing and asked the U.S. House Committee on Standards of Official Conduct, commonly known as the House Ethics Committee, to determine if his use of Congressional letterhead while arranging meetings to solicit contributions for the center had violated any House rules. House Speaker Nancy Pelosi agreed to Rangel's request.

==== Renting Harlem apartments at below-market rates ====
The New York Times reported in July 2008 that Rangel rented four apartments at below-market rates in the Lenox Terrace complex in Harlem. It reported that Rangel paid $3,894 monthly for all four apartments in 2007. In contrast, the landlord's going rate for similar apartments in the building was as high as $8,125 monthly. Three adjacent apartments were combined to create his 2,500-square-foot (230 m^{2}) home. A fourth unit was used as a campaign office, which violates city and state regulations that require rent-stabilized apartments to be used as a primary residence. Rangel received thousands of dollars in campaign contributions from one of the landlords, according to the paper. Rangel said his rent does not affect his representation of his constituents.

Congressional ethics experts said the difference in rent between what Rangel was paying and market rates, an estimated $30,000 per year, could be construed as a gift, exceeding the $100 House of Representatives gift limit. In late July, the House voted 254–138 to table a resolution by Republican Minority Leader John Boehner that would have censured Rangel for having "dishonored himself and brought discredit to the House", by occupying the four apartments.

==== House parking garage ====
A September 2008 New York Post article reported that Rangel had been using a House parking garage as free storage space for his Mercedes-Benz for years, in apparent violation of Congressional rules. Under Internal Revenue Service regulations, free parking (here, worth $290 a month) is considered imputed income, and must be declared on tax returns. In July 2010 the House Ethics Committee ruled that Rangel had committed no violation, since in practice the parking policy was only applied to Congressional staff and not to members themselves.

==== Taxes on Dominican villa rental income ====
Rangel was accused of failing to report income from his rental of a beachside villa he owned in Punta Cana in the Dominican Republic. A three-bedroom, three-bath unit, it rented out for as much as $1,100 per night in the busiest tourist season.

Labor lawyer Theodore Kheel, a principal investor in the resort development company and frequent campaign contributor to Rangel, had encouraged him to purchase the villa. Rangel purchased it in 1988 for $82,750. He financed $53,737.50 of the purchase price for seven years at an interest rate of 10.5%, but was one of several early investors whose interest payments were waived in 1990.

In September 2008, Rangel's attorney, Lanny Davis, disclosed that Rangel had failed to report on his tax returns or in congressional disclosure forms $75,000 in income he had received for renting his Dominican villa. That month, Rangel paid $10,800 to cover his liability for the related back taxes. He had owed back taxes for at least three years. The Ways and Means Committee writes the U.S. tax code, and as such his failure to pay taxes himself led to heavy criticism.

A September 14, 2008, New York Times editorial called for Rangel to step down temporarily from his chairmanship of the Ways and Means Committee while his ethical problems were investigated.

On September 24, 2008, the House Ethics Committee announced that it would investigate whether Rangel had violated its code of conduct or any law or other regulation related to his performance of his duties. On November 23, 2008, the New York Post reported that Rangel took a "homestead" tax break on his Washington, D.C., house for years, while simultaneously occupying multiple New York City rent-stabilized apartments, "possibly violating laws and regulations in both cases". In January 2009, Republican Representative John R. Carter introduced the Rangel Rule Act of 2009 (H.R. 735), a tongue-in-cheek proposal that would have allowed all taxpayers to not pay penalties and interest on back taxes, in reference to Rangel not yet having paid his.

==== Defense of tax shelter ====
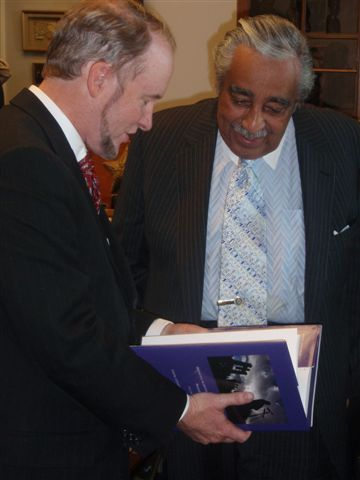
Rangel receives book written by U.S. consul general Gregory Slayton, in Bermuda in 2009.

In November 2008, following reports by The New York Times, Republican Congressmen asked the House Ethics Committee to look into Rangel's defense of a tax shelter approved by his Ways and Means Committee. One of the four companies that benefited from the loophole was Nabors Industries, which opened headquarters in Bermuda as a foreign corporation. Under the loophole Nabors received tens of millions of dollars in tax breaks. In 2004, Rangel had led opposition to the tax breaks. Nabors donated $1 million in 2006, and $100,000 later, to the City College of New York school named after Rangel.

Its CEO said the donations were unrelated to Rangel's February 2007 promise to oppose closing the loophole. He denied there was any quid pro quo, and called the article about it "malarkey". Rangel said The New York Times had ignored facts and explanations, and denied the charges. The House Ethics Committee voted in December 2008, to expand its investigation of Rangel to the matter. Eventually the Ethics Committee would not make a specific charge over this matter but did include it in the supporting documentation for the overall charge that Rangel had solicited Rangel Center donations from those with business before his committee.

==== Unreported assets and income ====
On September 15, 2008, it was disclosed that: (a) Rangel had omitted from his financial reports details regarding his sale of a Washington, D.C. home; (b) discrepancies existed in the values he listed for a property he owns in Sunny Isles, Florida (varying from $50,000 to $500,000); and (c) inconsistencies appeared in his investment fund reporting. He apologized, saying "I owed my colleagues and the public adherence to a higher standard of care, not only as a member of Congress, but even more as the chair of the House Ways and Means Committee." Republicans called for his removal as chair. Rangel said there was no justification for that, as the mistakes were errors of omission, that would not justify loss of his position.

In August 2009, Rangel amended his 2007 financial disclosure form to report more than $500,000 in previously unreported assets and income. That doubled his reported net worth. Unreported assets included a federal credit union checking account of between $250,000 and $500,000, several investment accounts, stock in Yum! Brands and PepsiCo, and property in Glassboro, New Jersey. Rangel also had not paid property taxes on two of his New Jersey properties which he was required by law to do.

The ethics issues led by December 2008 to some loss of standing for Rangel, to Republicans trying to tie him to all Democrats, and to some Democrats privately saying it would be best if Rangel stepped down from his Ways and Means post. In late 2008 and again in September 2009, the government watchdog group Citizens for Responsibility and Ethics in Washington named Rangel one of the 15 most corrupt members of Congress. Media pieces compared Rangel's woes with those of the unethical former Ways and Means chairs Wilbur Mills and Dan Rostenkowski. Nancy Pelosi, a long-time friend of Rangel's, withheld any possible action against Rangel pending the House Ethics Committee report. Rangel evinced impatience with that body, saying "I don't have a complaint now, except that it's taking too goddamn long to review this thing and report back." On September 3, 2009, The Washington Post called on Rangel to resign his chairmanship of the House Ways and Means Committee, given the ethical issues that had surfaced. Another Republican resolution was put forth to force him out of his chairmanship. However, Rangel stayed in place and mostly maintained his role in House leadership and policy discussions, including the Obama health care reform plan (opposition to which, he suggested, was partly due to racial prejudice against President Obama). Nevertheless, his influence was diminished by the questions surrounding him.

==== Caribbean trips ====
In May 2009, the non-profit National Legal and Policy Center filed an ethics complaint against Rangel and other members of Congress for trips, taken in 2007 and 2008 to Caribbean islands. The trips had been sponsored by Carib News Foundation, a New York non-profit funded by corporations with interests before Congress and the Ways and Means Committee. This combined with the duration of the trips seemed to violate House rules. The Ethics Committee agreed the following month to investigate the matter.

On February 26, 2010, the Ethics Committee issued its report. It determined that Rangel had violated House gift rules, by accepting reimbursement for his travel to the conferences. The committee found that he had not known of the contributions, but concluded that he was still responsible for them and was required to repay their cost. Five other members were cleared of having violated rules, but were also required to repay their trips. Rangel disagreed with the committee's finding, saying:

Because they were my staff members who knew, one of whom has been discharged, [the committee has decided] that I should have known. Common sense dictates that members of Congress should not be held responsible for what could be the wrongdoing, or mistakes, or errors of staff.

Pelosi said she would not take any action against Rangel pending further committee findings, as his staff had been more at fault and he had not broken any law. The Ethics Committee continued to investigate the charges against Rangel relating to obtaining rent-stabilized apartments, fundraising, and failure to disclose rental income from his Dominican villa.

==== Stepping aside as House Ways and Means Chair ====
After a February 2010 House Ethics Committee report criticizing him for taking sponsored Caribbean trips, the White House backed off its prior support of Rangel somewhat, and within days 14 Democratic members of Congress publicly called on Rangel to step aside as Ways and Means chair. Other Democrats were concerned that Rangel would impede Democrats' efforts to maintain their majority in the 2010 House elections, but did not say anything publicly out of respect and personal affection for Rangel. Momentum quickly built against Rangel, with 30 or more Democrats planning to oppose his continued chairmanship of the Ways and Means Committee, in a full House vote being pushed by Republicans. Democrat Paul Hodes of New Hampshire noted:

I think we're in a zero-tolerance atmosphere, and I think... Washington should be held to the highest ethical standards. I have the greatest admiration for Mr. Rangel's service to this country. He's been a great public servant. This is very, very unfortunate, but I think it's necessary.

On March 3, 2010, Rangel said he would take a leave of absence as chair, pending issuance of the Ethics Committee's report. Pelosi granted his request, but whether such a leave was possible was unclear and the House Speaker pro Tempore said that a resignation had taken place and that Rangel was no longer chair. Observers opined that it was unlikely that Rangel would ever be able to regain the position. Several Democrats said they would return or donate to charity campaign contributions given to them by Rangel. Representative Sander M. Levin of Michigan took over as acting chair.

==== House ethics committee charges ====
On July 22, 2010, a bipartisan, four-member investigative subcommittee of the House Ethics Committee indicated it had "substantial reason to believe" that Rangel had violated a range of ethics rules relating to the other charges. The matter was referred to another, newly created, special subcommittee to rule on the findings. Majority Leader Steny Hoyer said the action indicated the "process is working as it should, while Minority Leader John Boehner called the announcement "a sad reminder" of Speaker Nancy Pelosi's "most glaring broken promise: to 'drain the swamp' in Washington".

Rangel negotiated with the Ethics Committee. But participants in the talks characterized him as unwilling to admit wrongdoing in connection with several of the charges, and anxious about preserving his legacy. No settlement was reached.

On July 29, 2010, Rangel was charged by the committee with 13 counts of violating House rules and federal laws. Rangel's lawyers continued to insist that he had not intentionally violated any law or regulation, had not handed out political favors, and had not misused his office for personal financial gain. Rangel somberly only said this on the day the charges were announced:

"Sixty years ago, I survived a Chinese attack in North Korea. And as a result I wrote a book that, having survived that, that I haven't had a bad day since. Today I have to reassess that."

==== Re-election campaign of 2010 ====
Rangel suggested that Andrew Cuomo's primary run in the 2010 gubernatorial election against incumbent David Paterson, who was the first African American governor of New York, would undo years of work that Cuomo spent rebuilding his standing in the state Democratic Party after his bruising 2002 gubernatorial primary contest against Carl McCall. At the time McCall was the highest-ranking African American and first major party candidate for governor in the state. Rangel had been a staunch supporter of McCall against Cuomo in 2002. For the upcoming 2010 gubernatorial race, Rangel suggested that for the white Cuomo to challenge the African American incumbent would not be "the moral decision". Rangel said, "There might be an inclination for racial polarization in a primary in the state of New York. Since we have most African Americans registered as Democrats, and since you would be making an appeal for Democrats, it would be devastating in my opinion." Paterson fared poorly in polls due to several scandals and later abandoned his campaign re-election. By this point Rangel's continuing difficulties, along with the death a few months prior of Percy Sutton and the failure of Paterson (Basil A. Paterson's son), marked the end of the era of Harlem's "Gang of Four".

Rangel faced several Democratic primary challengers for his seat in 2010: Vincent Morgan, whose grassroots campaign bore many resemblances to Rangel's own against the scandal-plagued Adam Clayton Powell Jr., in 1970; Adam Clayton Powell IV, who had previously challenged Rangel in 1994; labor activist and past primary candidate for statewide office Jonathan Tasini; and former Obama campaign official Joyce Johnson. While Rangel's fund-raising was down from previous years, and he had paid nearly $2 million in legal fees, he still had far more cash available for the campaign than any of his challengers.

On September 14, 2010, Rangel prevailed in the primary election, gaining 51 percent of the vote against Powell's 23 percent and lesser amounts for the other contenders. He then won the November 2, 2010, general election easily, garnering 80 percent of the vote against Republican Michel Faulkner's 10 percent and smaller amounts for third-party candidates.

==== House ethics trial and censure ====
On November 15, 2010, Rangel's formal ethics trial began. He walked out of the hearing at the start, saying that he was unable to afford representation after having paid his previous lawyers over $2 million, and arguing unsuccessfully that the proceeding should be delayed until he could arrange for a legal defense fund.

On November 16, 2010, Rangel was found guilty on 11 of the 12 standing charges against him by the adjudicatory subcommittee of the House Ethics Committee. Two of the charges were focused on his actions with regards to soliciting funds and donations for the Rangel Center from those with business before the Ways and Means Committee; four were for improper use of Congressional letterhead and other House resources in those solicitations; one was for submitting incomplete and inaccurate financial disclosure statements; one was for using one of his Harlem apartments as an office when he had Congressional dealings with the landlord; one was for failing to pay taxes on his Dominican villa; and two reiterated these charges in describing general violations of House rules.

Two days later, a near-tears Rangel pleaded for "fairness and mercy" and he had support from fellow Representative John Lewis. But it was to no avail; the full Committee voted 9–1 to recommend that the full House approve a sanction of censure upon Rangel. The committee stated: "Public office is a public trust [and Rangel] violated that trust." Censure is the strongest penalty the House can impose short of outright expulsion from Congress. The committee also said that Rangel should make restitution for any unpaid taxes.

Supporters of Rangel argued that by comparison with previous cases, a reprimand would be a more fitting punishment for Rangel's trangressions than censure. Rangel repeatedly insisted, as he had all along, that nothing he had done was with the aim of enriching himself. It was to no avail. On December 2, 2010, a motion was made in the full House to censure Rangel. Ethics committee chair Zoe Lofgren emphasized that it was Rangel's "accumulation of actions" that warranted the stiffer penalty, and said that the treatment of Rangel should set a new precedent, not follow old ones. A motion to amend the resolution in favor of reprimand was voted down 267–146; most of Speaker Pelosi's allies rejected it and over 105 Democrats voted the resolution down. The House of Representatives then voted 333–79 to censure Rangel. Only two Republicans voted against censure, Peter T. King of Long Island and Don Young of Alaska. Per custom Rangel went to the well of the House to hear Speaker Pelosi solemnly read the formal measure of censure. It had been 27 years since the last such measure and Rangel was only the 23rd House member to be censured. Rangel asked to speak and said, "I know in my heart I am not going to be judged by this Congress. I'll be judged by my life in its entirety."

=== 2011–2017: Final years in Congress ===
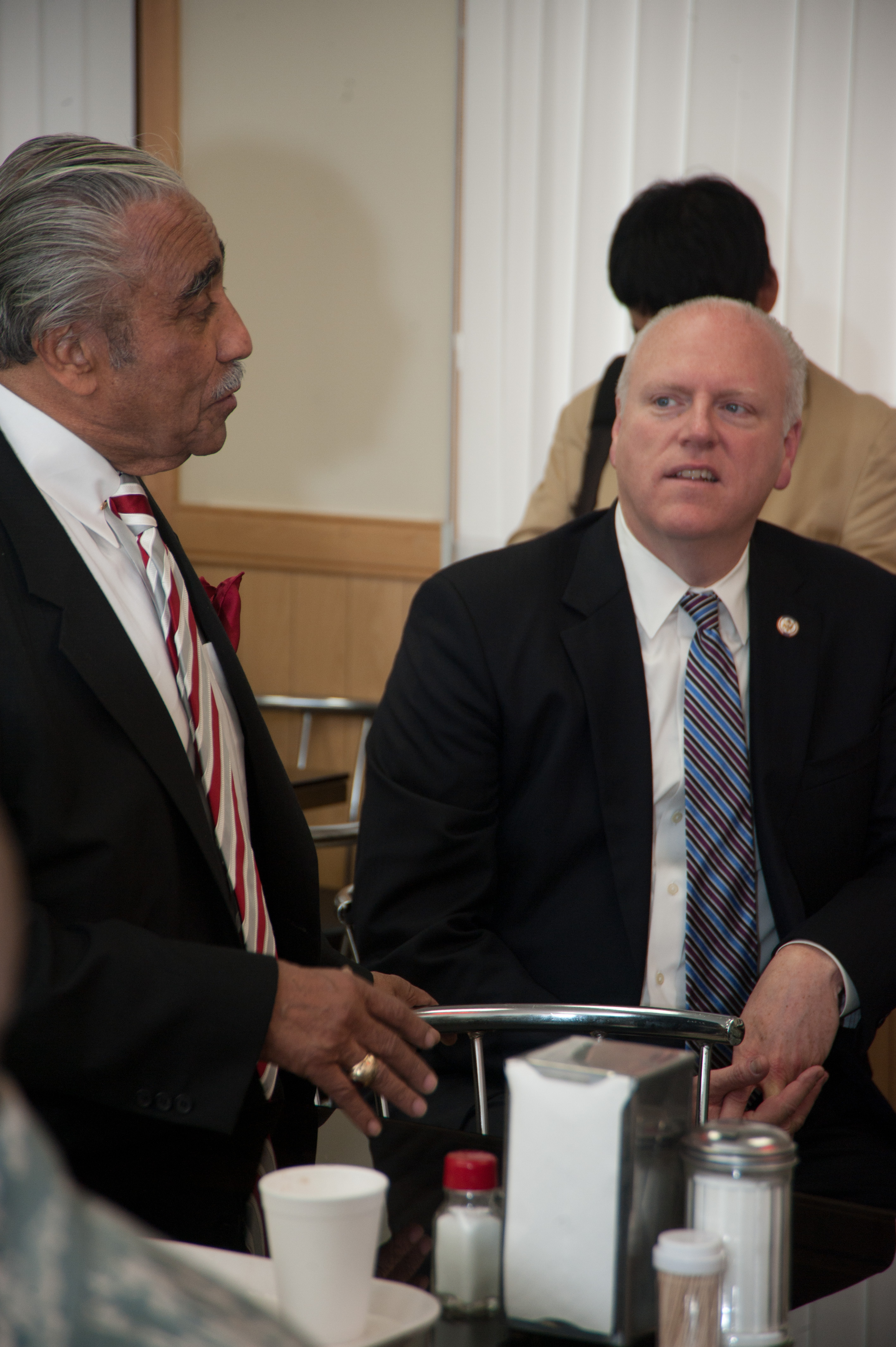
Rangel with fellow U.S. Representative Joseph Crowley in 2011

Republicans took over control of the House as the 112th Congress began in January 2011, meaning Rangel would have lost his Ways and Means chair even without his ethics issues. He was not considered for the ranking member slot either, which after a contested election among the Democratic caucus had gone to former acting chair Sander Levin. His difficulties were not completely over; the National Legal and Policy Center filed a complaint with the Federal Election Commission alleging that he had improperly paid legal bills from a political action committee. To cover both ongoing and past legal expenses he established a legal defense fund (whose creation was approved by the House Ethics Committee). Nonetheless, despite the censure and the issues around it, he was still a respected figure.

He was the first elected politician to use the subsequently-defunct Visible Vote mobile app to interact directly with his constituents.

During 2011 Rangel became the first member of Congress to declare support for the Occupy Wall Street movement and made several visits to their nearby demonstration site in Zuccotti Park. However, the protesters themselves picketed Rangel's office, objecting to his free trade stance (in particular to agreements he supported with Panama and with South Korea that they said resulted in jobs being exported).

In early 2012, Rangel was beset by a back injury and a serious viral infection; he was away from Congress for three months. Moreover, his district had been renumbered as the 13th District following the 2010 census, and its demographics had been changed significantly. He found himself in a district that stretched from Harlem to the Bronx and was now majority-Hispanic; it was 55 percent Hispanic and 27 percent African American. As a result, Rangel faced a serious primary challenge from State Senator Adriano Espaillat. Rangel struggled with fundraising, and he began receiving contributions from fellow members of Congress whom he had helped over the years. In the June 26 primary—the real contest in what was still an overwhelmingly Democratic district—Rangel defeated Espaillat by less than a thousand votes, with a result that took two weeks to fully resolve. He won the subsequent November general election easily.

In April 2013, Rangel filed a lawsuit in the United States District Court for the District of Columbia against several members and staff of the House Ethics Committee, saying that they had engaged in "numerous, flagrant, knowing and intentional violations" in their investigation against him. The suit sought to overturn the measure of censure that had been taken against him. In December 2013, Judge John D. Bates dismissed the suit, saying that there were "insurmountable separation-of-powers barriers" against the courts becoming involved in House of Representatives internal actions. Rangel appealed the dismissal, but the judge's action was upheld by the United States Court of Appeals for the District of Columbia Circuit in May 2015, saying the matter fell outside the jurisdiction of the courts. In October 2015, the United States Supreme Court declined to consider the case, ending Rangel's legal bid.

Rangel ran again in 2014, facing Espaillat once more in the Democratic primary as well as Michael Walrond, minister of the First Corinthian Baptist Church. Rangel said that if he was re-elected, it would be his final term in the House. He lost some of his traditional endorsements, but retained others and campaigned hard even while turning 84 years of age. In the June 24 primary the voting was again close but Rangel prevailed over Espaillat. Rangel faced no Republican opposition in the November general election and won easily against a minor party candidate, saying as he voted on November 4, "Today was a historic day and a very emotional day [as] I cast my final vote as a candidate on the ballot..."

After being strongly opposed to Benjamin Netanyahu's March 3, 2015, speech to Congress (in which, at the invitation of House Republicans, the Israeli Prime Minister spoke in opposition to the Obama administration's efforts to secure a comprehensive agreement on Iran's nuclear program) and saying he would be one of those Democrats not attending, Rangel changed his mind and did attend, attributing his reversal to the advice of friends and constituents and saying, "Enough damage has already been done... I don't want my absence to add to what is already a shattered type of relationship."

Due to a large personal loan he made to his campaign committee and his continuing struggles with fundraising, Rangel's 2014 re-election campaign debt stood at $140,000 as of June 2015. He engaged in various fundraising efforts during 2015 in an effort to reduce this debt, which brought about some criticism from The Center for Public Integrity that these efforts were not fully transparent. He had planned to raise money towards paying off that debt at his 85th birthday celebration to be held at the Plaza Hotel that month. Guests included Lady Gaga, Tony Bennett, and Hillary Clinton, however Clinton took over Rangel's party as a "Hillary for America" event to raise money for her 2016 presidential campaign.

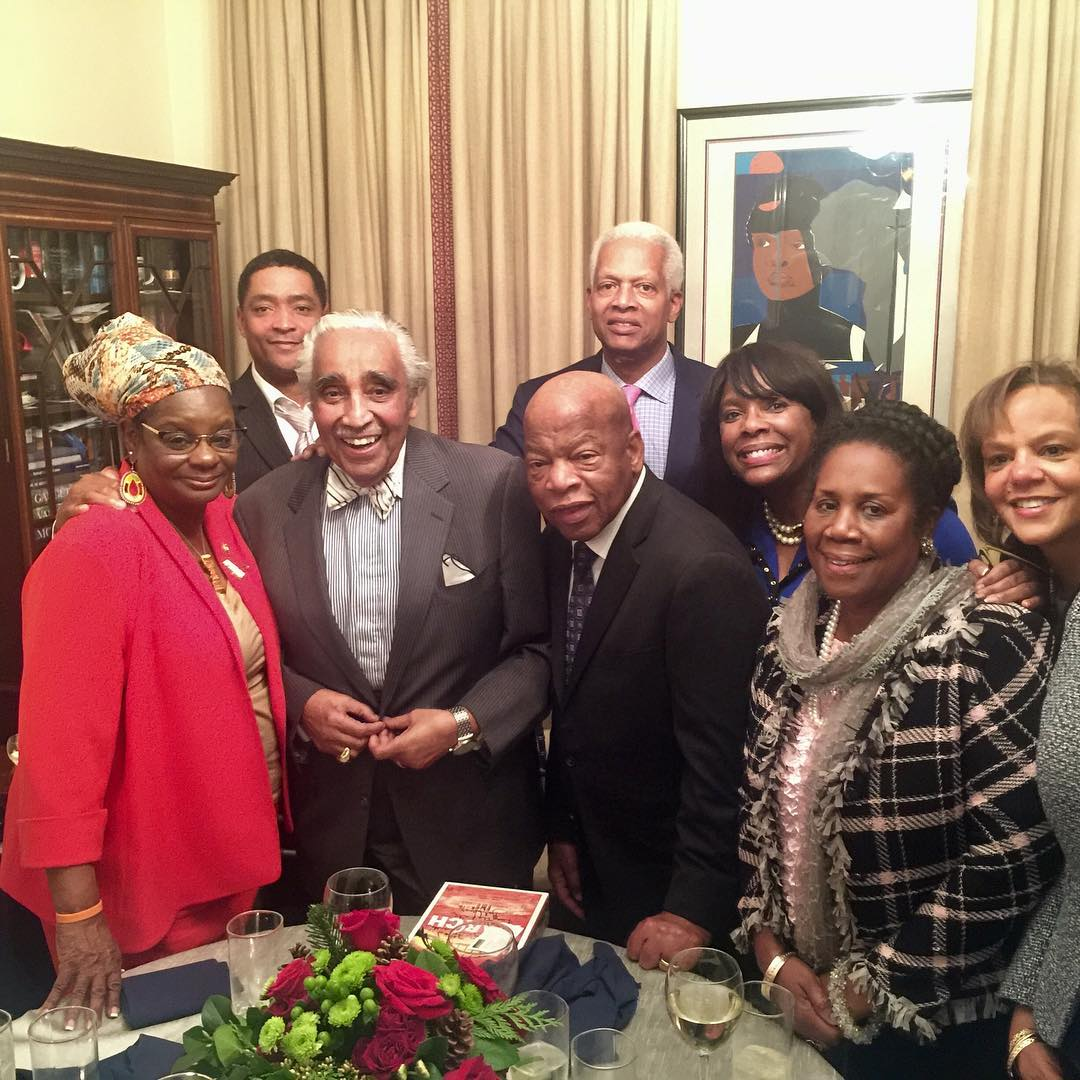
Rangel at his going-away party hosted by the Congressional Black Caucus in December 2016

As he had vowed two years earlier, Rangel did not run for re-election in the 2016 election. In the June 2016 Democratic primary election to effectively pick his successor, Rangel supported State Assemblyman Keith L. T. Wright, expressing the hope that an African American would continue to represent the district. However Espaillat won a close victory over Wright in a large field of candidates. Underlining the demographic changes that had been taking place, after winning the general election in November, Espaillat became the first non-African American to represent Harlem in the House since a series of Harlem-focused congressional districts were formed beginning in the 1940s. Rangel left office at the expiration of his term on January 3, 2017.

== Later years ==
After his retirement, Rangel was occasionally active in public life. He gave reflective interviews that also commented on the future course of Harlem. He endorsed Robert Jackson in his successful bid to unseat Marisol Alcantara in New York's 31st State Senate district in a 2018 race, and he endorsed Joe Biden during the 2020 Democratic presidential primaries.

When asked in 2019 whether he had ever witnessed any racist comments made by Donald Trump prior to his presidency, Rangel said he had not, but added: "I don't remember any remarks he ever made that was not sharing with me how much he thought about himself. It was always the same story."

Rangel served as grand marshal of Harlem's African American Day Parade in 2019. He rode in the parade again in 2022, at age 92, when it resumed following COVID-19 cancellations.

After leaving Congress, Rangel served as statesman-in-residence of the City College of New York, with the school's Charles B. Rangel Center for Public Service being named in his honor. In 2022, the Charles B. Rangel Infrastructure Workforce Initiative was begun at City College with the goal of increasing infrastructure-related employment levels in upper Manhattan and in the Bronx.

Rangel's wife, Alma, died in September 2024. Among her activities had been being vice chair of the board of the New York Foundation for Senior Citizens, and Alma Rangel Gardens, an 89-unit subsidized housing unit for seniors on West 137th Street in Harlem, is an entity she helped create.

== Death ==
Rangel died at Harlem Hospital Center on May 26, 2025, at the age of 94. He had been living in the Lenox Terrace apartment complex in Harlem at the time of his death.

Tributes for Rangel came from many senior figures in the Democratic Party. New York Governor Kathy Hochul announced that flags across the state of New York would fly at half-staff in Rangel's honor on May 27 and on June 13, the day of his funeral. He laid in repose at St. Aloysius Church in Harlem on June 9, 2025. Public viewings were held on June 9 and June 10. A memorial service was held by Harlem community leaders on the evening of June 10.

Rangel would lay in state at New York City Hall on June 11 and 12, with public viewing held on June 12. He was the first person to lie in state at New York City Hall since James Davis in 2003. His casket was guarded by uniformed personnel from both the New York Fire and Sanitation Departments. On June 12, New York politicians spoke at a ceremony in City Hall honoring Rangel, including Hillary Clinton and U.S. House Minority Leader Hakeem Jeffries. The same day, an honor guard service was held for Rangel, with the pallbearers representing the African American-led 369th Regiment of the U.S. Army, also known as the "Harlem Hellfighters." On June 13, Rangel's casket was removed from City Hall, and his funeral was held at St. Patrick's Cathedral. At the funeral, New York Governor Kathy Hochul opened the eulogies, with Hakeem Jeffries, Senate Minority Leader Chuck Schumer, former President Bill Clinton, and former House Speaker Nancy Pelosi among the other politicians who delivered eulogies.

Meanwhile, 70 members of the South Korean National Assembly, including Rep. Choi Hyung-du, proposed a resolution to commemorate the deceased. The resolution expresses gratitude for their participation in the Korean War and honors their contributions to the development of the ROK-US alliance.

On July 16, 2025, Charles and Alma Rangel were interred in Section 62, Grave 1957 of Arlington National Cemetery.

== Political positions ==
Various advocacy groups have given Rangel scores or grades as to how well his votes align with the positions of each group. (Note: Mayer, William. "Kerry's Record Rings a Bell", The Washington Post March 28, 2004. "The question of how to measure a senator's or representative's ideology is one that political scientists regularly need to answer. For more than 30 years, the standard method for gauging ideology has been to use the annual ratings of lawmakers' votes by various interest groups, notably the Americans for Democratic Action (ADA) and the American Conservative Union (ACU).") Overall as of 2003, Rangel had an average lifetime 91 percent "liberal quotient" from Americans for Democratic Action. National Journal rates congressional votes as liberal or conservative on the political spectrum, in three policy areas: economic, social, and foreign. For 2005–2006, Rangel's averages were as follows: economic rating 91 percent liberal and 6 percent conservative, social rating 94 percent liberal and 5 percent conservative, and foreign rating 84 percent liberal and 14 percent conservative.

Project Vote Smart provides the ratings of many, many lesser known interest groups with respect to Rangel. Rangel typically had 100 ratings from NARAL Pro-Choice America, and Planned Parenthood and, inversely, 0 ratings or close to that from the National Right to Life Committee. He typically got very high ratings in the 90s or 100 from the American Civil Liberties Union, the Leadership Conference on Civil Rights, and the National Association for the Advancement of Colored People. The League of Conservation Voters usually gave Rangel around a 90 rating. Taxpayers for Common Sense gave Rangel ratings in the middling 40–50 range, while the National Taxpayers Union typically gave Rangel very low ratings or an "F" grade.

== Political image ==
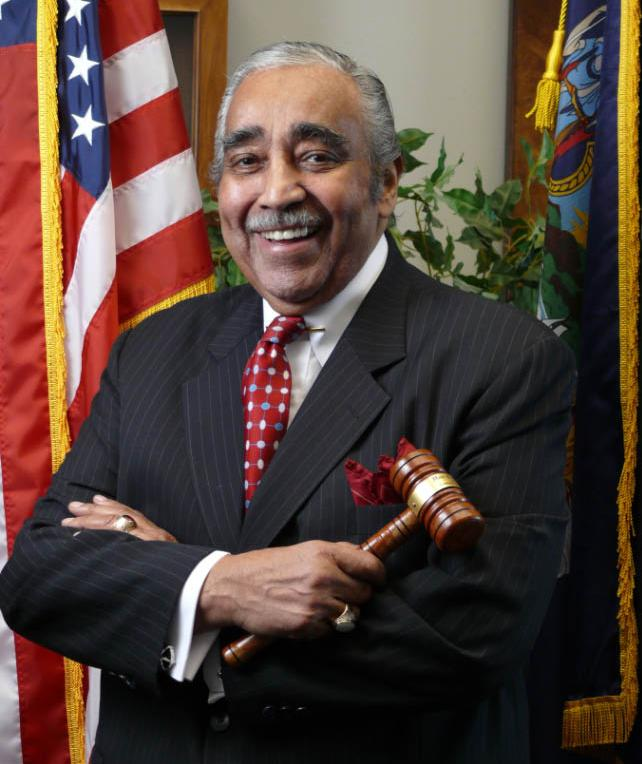
Rangel with his gavel in 2009, as Chairman of the House Ways and Means Committee

Rangel was known as an energetic, genial, and sociable politician, one who was able to gain friendship and influence by means of charm, humor, and candor. He was called "Charlie" by everyone in Congress from the highest-ranking members to the custodial employees. As one obituary wrote, "He was Charlie to constituents and to colleagues who, had there been a congressional yearbook, would have voted him Mr. Conviviality." Of his political skills, 1980s Ways and Means chair Dan Rostenkowski said, "Charlie has the gifted knack of getting you to change your position, and you actually enjoy doing it. Compromising isn't so unusual in Congress. Enjoying it is." The New York congressman's ability to use humor to catch others off guard before making a political point was called "Rangeling" by lobbyists and others on Capitol Hill. Many of his closest friends and allies in Congress were not other African Americans, but white representatives from working class or rural districts. O'Neill aide Chris Matthews said these members were "tied emotionally and culturally to the people they represent".

Rangel has been described as having a meticulous appearance. Long-time mentor Percy Sutton recalled, "In the beginning I called him Pretty Boy Rangel, to denigrate him, because he was one of those handsome types, hair pushed down and that mustache. But he had a way about him, with that great humor, an ability to influence people." Later The New York Times described him thus: "After three decades in public life, the portly, gravel-voiced Mr. Rangel, who is very much the Old World-style gentleman yet sprinkles his sentences with mild profanity, still takes politics personally." In contrast, Rangel and his office were disorganized, with criticism even from supporters for having taken on more things than he could keep track of. The congressman's life was dominated by politics with no hobbies and few friendships outside of it. Loyalties to Rangel were severely tested when he was being investigated for possible ethics violations and a number of political figures bailed out on a lavish 80th birthday gala planned for Rangel at New York's Plaza Hotel.

Rangel was known for his blunt speaking and candor. When asked how he would like to be remembered, he paraphrased Rhett Butler in Gone with the Wind: "Well, ... if I'm gone, quite frankly, I don't give a damn." Speaking at a Congressional Black Caucus town meeting in September 2005, his frustration over the slow federal response to Hurricane Katrina led him to compare Bush to the Southern Democrat Bull Connor, a 1960s symbol of white opposition to the civil rights movement, saying: "George Bush is our Bull Connor." A few days later he said both figures had become focal points for American Blacks to rally against. His first remark led to a public exchange with Vice President Dick Cheney who said, "I'm frankly surprised at his comments. It almost struck me—they were so out of line, it almost struck me that... Charlie was having some problem. Charlie is losing it, I guess." Rangel responded by saying, "The fact that he would make a crack at my age, he ought to be ashamed of himself... He should look so good at seventy-five." Rangel again expressed his displeasure with the vice president in October 2006—after Cheney had said that "Charlie doesn't understand how the economy works"—by opining that Cheney was "a real son of a bitch" who "enjoys a confrontation" and suggesting that Cheney required professional treatment for mental defects. The White House said that the vice president did not take Rangel's comments personally and had a "big hearty laugh" over them.

Rangel sometimes seemed to find the other side; following the 2006 Hugo Chávez speech at the United Nations in which the Venezuelan leader implied that Bush was the devil, Rangel said, "I want President Chávez to please understand that even though many people in the United States are critical of our president that we resent the fact that he would come to the United States and criticize President Bush... you don't come into my country, you don't come into my congressional district and you don't condemn my president."

Other remarks of Rangel's revolved around Rangel's feelings about his home state and city, such as disparaging the state of Mississippi (Note: In November 2006, Rangel, in announcing some of his plans as new chairman of the House Ways and Means Committee, said he planned to push more funds into his home state of New York. He added to this, "Mississippi gets more than their fair share back in federal money, but who the hell wants to live in Mississippi?" Mississippi Representative Chip Pickering demanded an apology and Rangel issued a statement declaring: "I certainly don't mean to offend anyone. I just love New York so much that I can't understand why everyone wouldn't want to live here." See Pettus, Emily Wagster (November 10, 2006). "Miss. Congressman Wants Rangel Apology". The Washington Post. Archived from the original on April 29, 2018.) or suggesting that President Obama and First Lady Michelle Obama might be unsafe if they visited New York. (Note: In May 2009, when asked by the New York Daily News what President Obama and First Lady Michelle Obama should do during a visit to New York, Rangel replied, "Make certain he doesn't run around in East Harlem unidentified." Rangel said this following the accidental shooting of African-American New York Police Department officer Omar Edwards by Caucasian fellow officer Andrew Dunton, an incident of mistaken identity. See Katz, Celeste (May 30, 2009). "Rep. Charles Rangel, in wake of cop shooting, suggests even President Obama not safe in Harlem". New York Daily News. Archived from the original on June 2, 2009. The comment was criticized by New York City Mayor Michael Bloomberg, who said, "I have a lot of respect for Charlie Rangel, but in this case, he's just plain wrong. This was a tragedy. Our police department is diverse, and they train; sometimes things happen and they're inexplicable. There's no reason to suspect this had any racial overtones." See "Rangel Apologizes for Friendly-Fire Crack". WNBC-TV. June 1, 2009. Rangel soon apologized for the comment, saying, "It was entirely inappropriate to bring the President and his wife into this discussion during their visit to New York and I hope my off-the-cuff comment did not cause embarrassment to anyone." See Yaniv, Oren (June 1, 2009). "Charlie Rangel says he's sorry for involving the Obamas in controversial racism joke". New York Daily News.) In both cases apologies from the congressman followed. In certain instances, his remarks only exacerbated his existing problems. When his ethics issues were made public, Rangel remarked that Governor of Alaska and Republican vice presidential nominee Sarah Palin was "disabled". (Note: In September 2008 – after spending a week avoiding reporters's questions on his ethics issues, by just giving his name, rank, and serial number – while being interviewed by Marcia Kramer on WCBS-TV, Rangel said of Governor of Alaska and Republican vice presidential nominee Sarah Palin, "You got to be kind to the disabled." When Kramer pressed him on whether he really thought she was disabled, Rangel replied, "There's no question about it politically. It's a nightmare to think that a person's foreign policy is based on their ability to look at Russia from where they live." New York Congressman Pete King demanded that Rangel apologize, especially given that Palin's five-month-old son, Trig, had Down syndrome, saying, "Charlie owes a sincere apology to Sarah Palin and the entire disabled community. All of us know parents who have disabled children or relatives, so from any perspective this was wrong, wrong, wrong." Carr Massi, the president of Disabled in Action, also criticized Rangel: "I am not one of [Palin's] fans, but I don't like the idea he referred to the woman as disabled. I mean he is talking about her politics – that word has no place there." Rangel suggested later in an interview with the New York Daily News that his comments were aimed at her thin foreign policy background and dismissed suggestions that he was talking about her newborn son as ridiculous. The episode prompted Politico to declare that "Rangel's off the rails." See Sisk, Richard; Saltonstall, David (September 20, 2008). "Charlie Rangel on hot seat for labeling Sarah Palin 'disabled'". New York Daily News. Archived from the original on September 20, 2008. and Thrush, Glenn (September 19, 2008). "In odd rant, Charlie calls Palin "disabled"". Politico.) In 2013, he compared the Tea Party movement to segregationists who opposed the Civil Rights Movement and said they could be defeated the same way: "It is the same group we faced in the South with those white crackers and the dogs and the police. They didn't care about how they looked. It was just fierce indifference to human life that caused America to say enough is enough."

== Electoral history ==
After defeating Adam Clayton Powell Jr. in the Democratic primary in 1970, Rangel won re-election to represent New York's 18th, 19th, 16th, 15th, 13th districts at different times.

== Awards and honors ==
Rangel's work with the Congressional Black Caucus resulted in awards being given to him, such as in 1986. These awards, given by the Congressional Black Caucus Foundation and known as the Phoenix Awards, included the William L. Dawson Award in 1986, the Lifetime Distinguished Service Award in 2003, and the CBC Founders Award in 2016.

Rangel was given the Jackie Robinson Foundation's Lifetime Achievement Award in 2005. In 2006, he received the Distinguished Service Award from the Washington International Trade Association.

Rangel received a number of honorary degrees, including ones from Hofstra University (1989), Syracuse University (2001), Suffolk University Law School (2002), and Bard College (2008). In 2006 he received a Presidential Medal from Baruch College.

In 2011, Rangel received the Felton Davis Award of Merit from the New York Association of Chapters of Alpha Phi Alpha Fraternity, Inc.

== See also ==
- List of African-American United States representatives
- List of Afro-Latinos
- List of people from Harlem
- List of United States representatives expelled, censured, or reprimanded
- List of federal political scandals in the United States

== Cited bibliography ==
- Appleman, Roy (1989). Disaster in Korea: The Chinese Confront MacArthur. College Station, Texas: Texas A&M University Press. ISBN 0-89096-344-4.
- Barone, Michael; Cohen, Richard E. (2008). The Almanac of American Politics 2008 (paperback). Washington, D.C.: National Journal Group. ISBN 978-0-89234-117-7.
- Fehrenbach, T. R. (2000). This Kind Of War: The Classic Korean War History (50th anniversary ed.). Dulles, Virginia: Brassey's. ISBN 1-57488-334-8.
- Moritz, Charles, ed. (1984). Current Biography Yearbook 1984. New York: H. W. Wilson Company.
- Ragsdale, Bruce A.; Treese, Joel D. (1990). Black Americans in Congress, 1870–1989. Washington, D.C.: U.S. House of Representatives. House Document No. 101–117.
- Black Americans in Congress 1870–2007. Washington, D.C.: U.S. House of Representatives. 2008. House Document No. 108–224. Archived from the original on January 13, 2012.
- Rangel, Charles B.; Wynter, Leon (2007). And I Haven't Had a Bad Day Since: From the Streets of Harlem to the Halls of Congress. New York: St. Martin's Press. ISBN 978-0-312-38213-1.

U.S. House of Representatives
Preceded by Adam Clayton Powell Jr.	Member of the U.S. House of Representatives from New York's 18th congressional district 1971–1973	Succeeded by Ed Koch
Preceded by Bella Abzug	Member of the U.S. House of Representatives from New York's 19th congressional district 1973–1983	Succeeded by Mario Biaggi
Preceded by Louis Stokes	Chair of the Congressional Black Caucus; 1974–1976	Succeeded by Yvonne Brathwaite Burke
Preceded by Chuck Schumer	Member of the U.S. House of Representatives from New York's 16th congressional district 1983–1993	Succeeded by José E. Serrano
Preceded by Leo C. Zeferetti	Chair of the House Narcotics Abuse Committee; 1983–1992	Position abolished
Preceded by S. William Green	Member of the U.S. House of Representatives from New York's 15th congressional district 1993–2013	Succeeded by José E. Serrano
Preceded by Sam Gibbons	Ranking Member of the House Ways and Means Committee; 1997–2007	Succeeded by Jim McCrery
Preceded by Bill Thomas	Chair of the House Ways and Means Committee; 2007–2010	Succeeded by Pete Stark; Acting
Preceded by Michael Grimm	Member of the U.S. House of Representatives from New York's 13th congressional district 2013–2017	Succeeded by Adriano Espaillat
