= Lara Brown =

American political scientist

Lara M. Brown
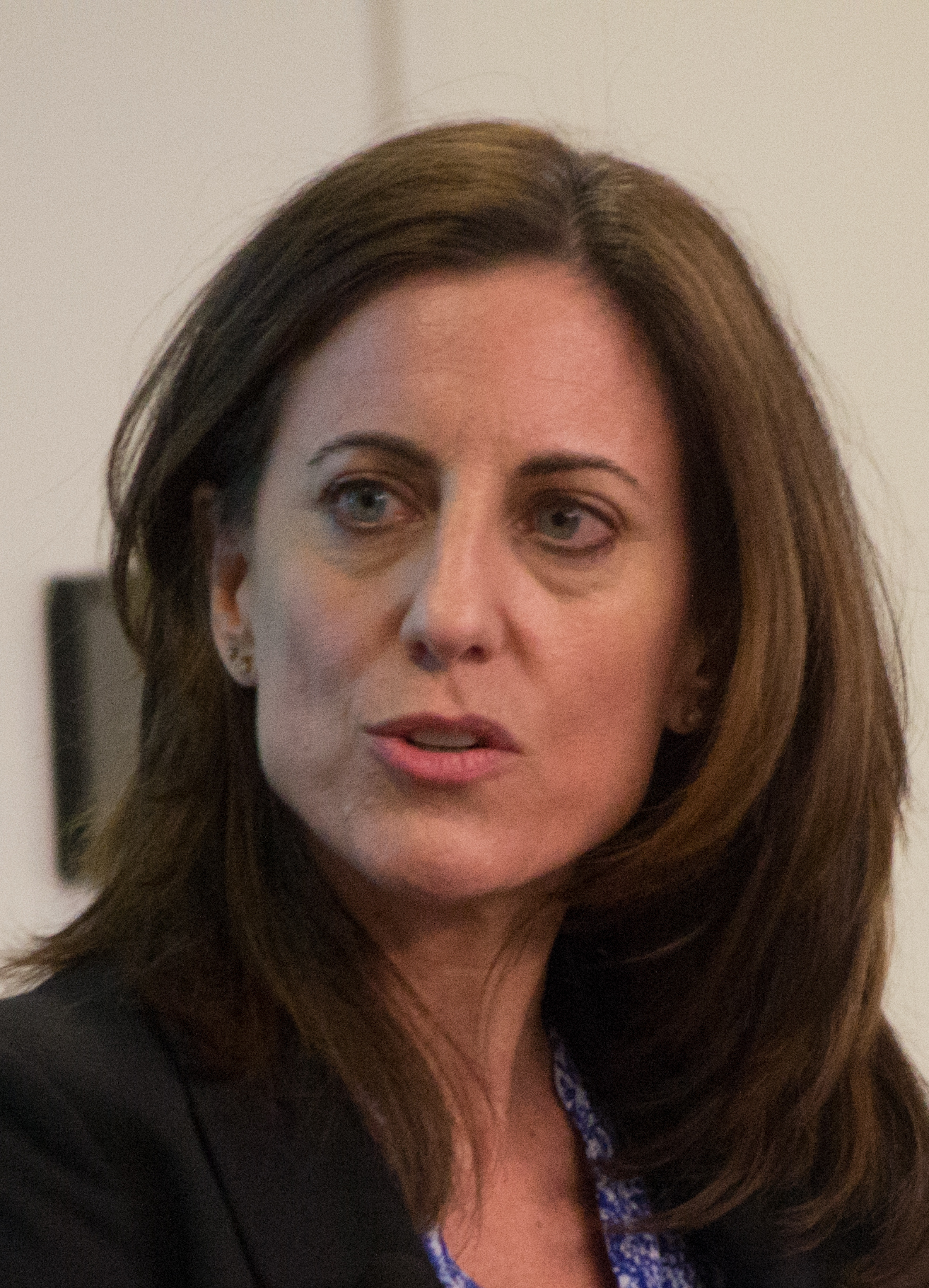
- Born: Lara Michelle Brown; February 3, 1970 (age 56); Borrego Springs, California, U.S.
- Occupation: Director of The Graduate School of Political Management
- Spouse: Major Garrett (m. 2016)
- Children: 3

Academic background
- Education: University of Arizona; University of California
- Website: https://larambrownphd.com

Lara M. Brown is an American political scientist who served as director of the Graduate School of Political Management at George Washington University between 2016 and 2022.

== Early life and education ==
Brown was born and brought up in California. She obtained a BA, MA and PhD in political sciences from the University of California, Los Angeles. She later obtained an MA in American politics and public policy from the University of Arizona.

== Career ==
Brown started her career in academia and eventually served as an assistant professor at Villanova University. She then served as an education policy and public affairs consultant in Silicon Valley and Los Angeles for some time and later returned to her academic career. She also served in the Department of Education in President Bill Clinton's administration.

=== George Washington University ===
In 2013, Brown joined the Graduate School of Political Management as an associate professor and director for the Political Management Program. In 2016, she was appointed as interim director of the Graduate School of Political Management. In 2017, she was named as its new director. Brown was promoted to the rank of Professor of Political Management in In July 2021.

== Notable views and positions ==
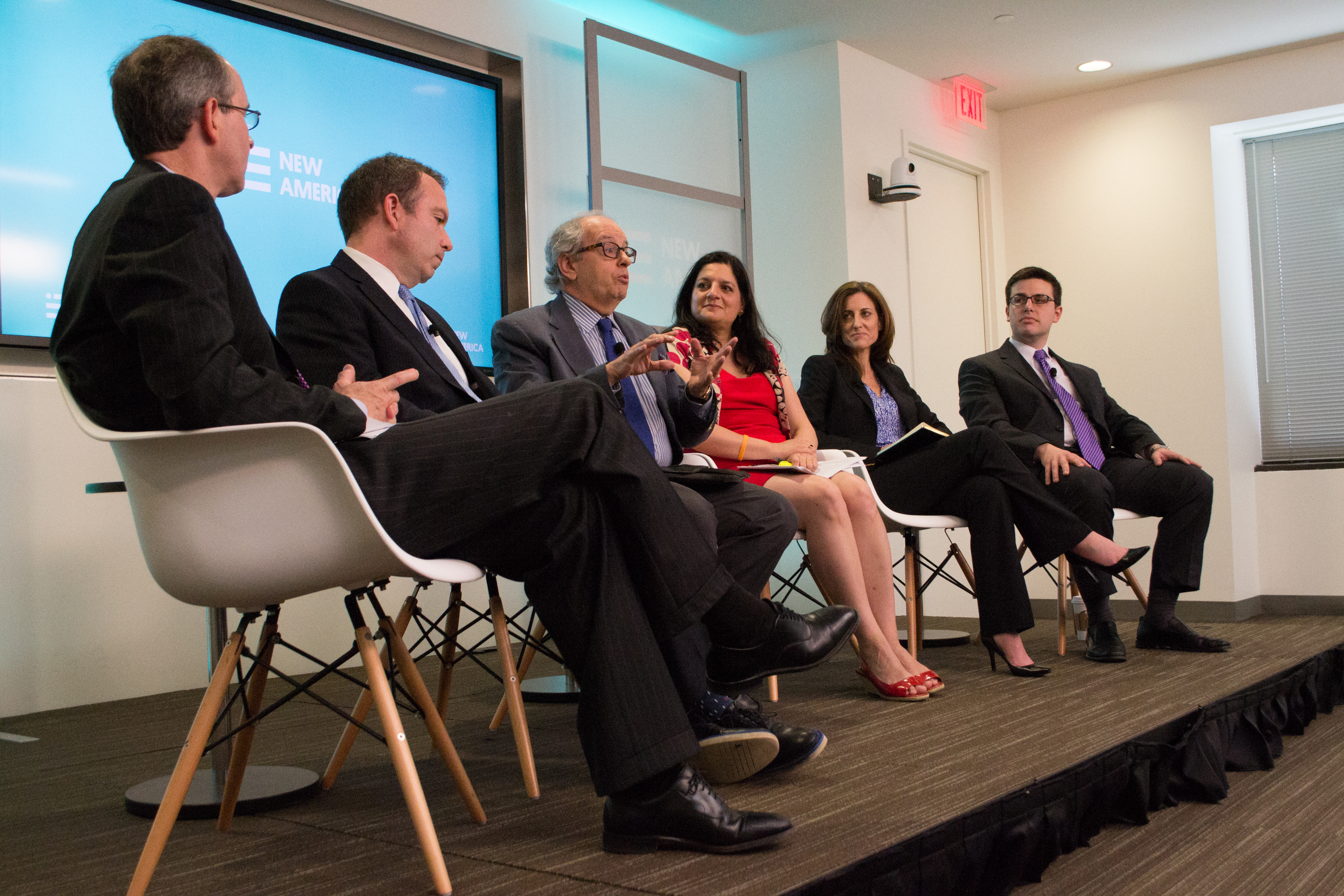
Brown in 2016 (second on the right), taking part in a New America policy roundtable discussion on the implications of a potential election of Donald Trump

Brown is considered to be an expert in presidential campaigns and elections and thus frequently participates in different media, commenting on and writing about politics, elections and governance. She has written blog posts for The New York Times, Politico, The Hill, The Huffington Post and regularly contributes to U.S. News & World Report's Thomas Jefferson Street blog.

Brown served on the board of directors of The New Agenda, an organization focused on advancing women rights.

== Works ==
Brown is a distinguished author and a dedicated scholar. She has authored, co-authored, edited and contributed to a variety of books and scientific publications.

=== Books ===
- Jockeying for the American Presidency: The Political Opportunism of Aspirants (Cambria, 2010)
- The Presidential Leadership Dilemma: Between the Constitution and a Political Party, Julia R. Azari, Lara M. Brown, and Zim G. Nwokora, eds., (SUNY, 2013)

== Personal life ==
Brown is married to Major Garrett. The couple lives in Washington, D.C.
