= Pomper =

Pomper is a surname. Notable people with the surname include:

- Brian Pomper, American lawyer, political strategist, and lobbyist
- Gerald M. Pomper (born 1935), American political scientist
- Margriet Pomper (born 1954), Dutch long track speed skater
- Sean Pomper, American inventor
- Tibor Pomper (born 1977), Hungarian footballer

== See also ==
- Pomp (disambiguation)
