= Major Garrett =

American journalist (born 1962)

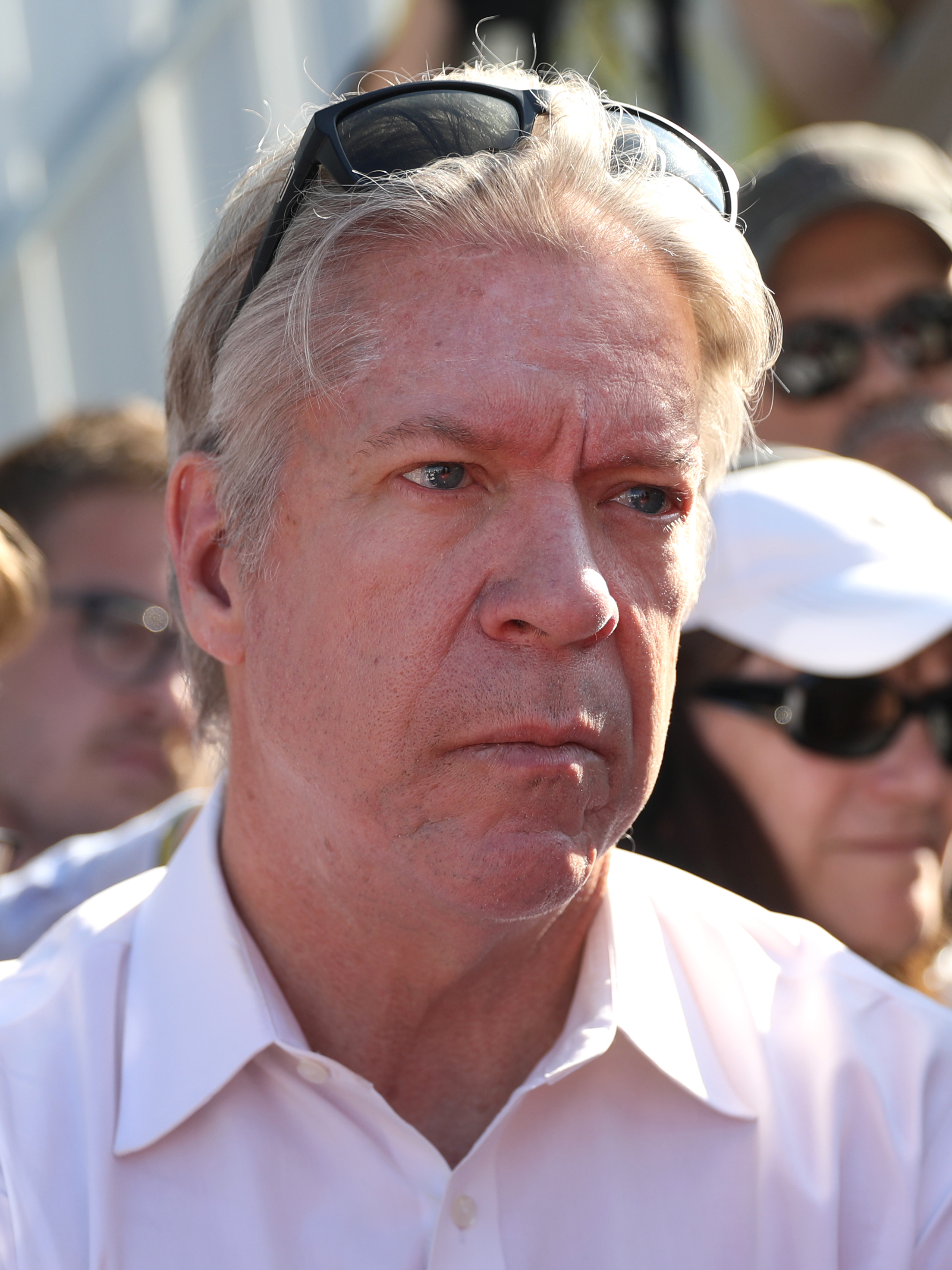
- Garrett in 2023
- Born: Major Elliott Garrett; August 24, 1962 (age 64); San Diego, California, U.S.
- Education: University of Missouri (BJ, BS)
- Occupation: Chief Washington Correspondent with CBS News
- Spouses: Julie Kirtz (m. 1990; div. 2015) Lara Brown (m. 2016)
- Children: 3

Major Elliott Garrett (born August 24, 1962) is an American journalist who is chief Washington correspondent for CBS News and the host of The Takeout on CBS News 24/7. He was previously a correspondent for National Journal, prior to which he was the senior White House correspondent for Fox News. He covered the 2004 presidential election, the war on terror, and the 2008 presidential election, and he is also a fill-in and substitute anchor for the CBS Evening News, and Face the Nation.

== Early life ==
Garrett was born and raised in San Diego, California, where he attended James Madison High School. He graduated from the University of Missouri with a Bachelor of Journalism and a Bachelor of Science in political science in 1984. He is a member of Phi Gamma Delta.

== Career ==
In the 1990s, Garrett was a senior editor and congressional correspondent for U.S. News & World Report and a congressional reporter for The Washington Times before joining CNN's White House team in early 2000 and Fox News in 2002 as a general assignment reporter. There, he covered the 2004 election and served as the network's congressional correspondent. He has also been a White House correspondent for CNN and an award-winning reporter across the country for the Houston Post, the Las Vegas Review-Journal, and the Amarillo Globe-News. His articles have appeared in such magazines as The Weekly Standard, Washington Monthly, and Mother Jones.

Garrett covered then United States Senator Barack Obama's presidential campaign. On January 13, 2009, Garrett became the senior White House correspondent for the Fox News Channel. Garrett left Fox News on September 3, 2010, to join National Journal. His final day on Fox News was on America Live with Megyn Kelly. At that time he was also a frequent guest commentator on MSNBC, and CBS's Face the Nation.

It was announced on Face the Nation on November 18, 2012, that Garrett would be joining CBS News as Chief White House Correspondent. He was named CBS News Chief Washington Correspondent in December 2018.

In July 2015, Garrett made headlines when he asked President Obama during a press conference why he was "content" with the Iran Nuclear Deal that left four Americans—Amir Mirza Hekmati, Jason Rezaian, Saeed Abedini, and Robert Levinson—trapped in Iran. Obama criticized Garrett's framing of the question, saying that conditioning the deal on their release would have incentivized Iran to "get additional concessions out of the Americans by holding these individuals".

Garrett hosted The Takeout, a weekly podcast about politics, public policy, and pop culture. The series ended in 2025 after eight seasons; in May 2025, CBS announced that The Takeout would be revived as a weekday talk show on CBS News 24/7 beginning May 27.

== Personal life ==
Garrett is married to Lara Brown and lives in Washington, D.C.

== Bibliography ==
External videos
- Booknotes interview with Garrett and Tim Penny on Common Cents, May 14, 1995, C-SPAN
- Q&A interview with Garrett on Mr. Trump's Wild Ride, September 23, 2018, C-SPAN
- Presentation by Garrett on Mr. Trump's Wild Ride, October 2, 2018, C-SPAN
- After Words interview with Garrett and David Becker on The Big Truth, November 6, 2022, C-SPAN

- Common Cents (Little, Brown, 1995, ISBN 0-316-69912-8)
- The Fifteen Biggest Lies in Politics (St. Martin's Griffin, 2000, ISBN 978-0-312-25459-9)
- The Enduring Revolution: How the Contract with America Continues to Shape the Nation (Crown Forum, 2005, ISBN 978-1-4000-5466-4)
- The Enduring Revolution: The Inside Story of the Republican Ascendancy and Why It Will Continue (Three Rivers Press, 2006, ISBN 978-1-4000-5467-1)
- Mr. Trump's Wild Ride: The Thrills, Chills, Screams, and Occasional Blackouts of an Extraordinary Presidency (St. Martin's Press, 2018, ISBN 9781250185914)
- The Big Truth: Upholding Democracy in the Age of "The Big Lie" (with David Becker) (Diversion Books, 2022, ISBN 9781635767841)

== See also ==
- White House press corps

Media offices
Preceded by Norah O'Donnell	Chief White House Correspondent, CBS News; November 2012 – December 2018	Succeeded by Nancy Cordes
Preceded by John Dickerson	Chief Washington Correspondent, CBS News; December 2018 – current	Succeeded by Incumbent
Preceded by John Dickerson (interim)	CBS Evening News anchor May 20–24, 2019 (Interim Anchor)	Succeeded by David Begnaud (interim)
