= Evan Tracey =

American communications executive

- Education: George Mason University

Evan Tracey is an American communications executive, media analyst and the co-founder and chief operating officer at Campaign Media Analysis Group.

== Early life and education ==
Tracey graduated with a B.A. from West Virginia Wesleyan College and subsequently obtained an M.A. from George Mason University.

== Career ==
Tracey worked at National Media Research, Planning and Placement (NMRPP) and then, in 1996, went on to co-found and lead Kantar Media's Campaign Media Analysis Group, a strategic media data and research agency for politics and public affairs advertising. Throughout his time with the company he served as COO, CEO and President for a total of 16 years.

Subsequently, he served as Senior Vice President of Communications for the American Coalition for Clean Coal Electricity (ACCCE), where he supervised a $35 million advocacy campaign.

== Membership and affiliations ==
Tracey is frequently invited to speak at different public events and comment on national and international media.

He has lectured at the Vicente Fox Center, Harvard's Kennedy School and currently serves as adjunct professor at the George Washington University's Graduate School of Political Management.
