= Upper Manhattan Empowerment Zone Development Corporation =

Nonprofit organization in New York, US

The Upper Manhattan Empowerment Zone Development Corp., also referred to as UMEZ, is a non-profit organization that seeks to revitalize economically deprived communities by using public funds and tax incentives as catalysts for private investment. UMEZ’s mission is to sustain the economic revitalization of all communities of Upper Manhattan through job creation, corporate alliances, strategic investments and small business assistance.

== History ==
Upper Manhattan was designated as an urban empowerment zone (Empowerment Zone) under federal legislation authored by Congressman Charles B. Rangel and signed into law by President Bill Clinton in 1994. The Upper Manhattan Empowerment Zone Development Corporation (UMEZ), which is an independent not-for-profit corporation, was formed in response to the federal empowerment zone legislation. Funding for UMEZ is provided by the federal government with matching amounts from the City of New York and the State of New York. UMEZ’s ongoing operations are not dependent on the extension of the federal empowerment zone legislation, which has been extended periodically, and UMEZ expects to continue to operate if the Empowerment Zone designation expires.

By the close of 2013 UMEZ provided funding for: more than $90 million in grants focused on arts and culture and workforce development $72 million in loans to mixed-use real estate development projects, commercial businesses, and small business enterprises $57 million in tax-exempt bonds for real estate development projects for a total of almost $220 million of investments.

UMEZ investments have leveraged over $1 billion of private capital invested in Upper Manhattan, and this commitment has created nearly 9,000 direct jobs thus far.

The Empowerment Zone’s legacy will live on in the substantial investment that it has made in projects across Upper Manhattan. Papers by Professor Ester Fuchs and the Initiative for a Competitive Inner City detail the investments and impact. In recent years major corporations and residents with higher-levels of disposable incomes have flocked to Harlem. "The zone has awesome potential," says Lloyd A. Williams, president and CEO of the Greater Harlem Chamber of Commerce, but revolutions don't happen overnight. The zone is a tool. We have to make sure it's not the only tool that we have".

== Leadership ==
Blair M. Duncan is the president and CEO of UMEZ.

UMEZ Board of Directors Joseph J. Johnson, III (Chair), Nikisha Alcindor, Kevin Chavers, Maurine Knighton, Anthony Q. Fletcher, Amir Kirkwood, Harriet Michel, Diane Collier, Michael Smart, Maxine Griffith, Teresa Eyring, Keith Taylor, Ed.D. Carmen Vasquez, Rekha Nambiar, Lisa Downing, Nilsa Orama

Community Partners: New York Women's Chamber of Commerce; Audubon Partnership for Economic Development and Harlem Business Alliance
