= Mike Fernandez (adjunct professor) =

American business executive

Mike Fernandez is a business executive who has led communications, marketing, government relations and sustainability for a number of large companies (US WEST (now CenturyLink), Cigna, Conagra Brands, State Farm, Cargill and Enbridge). Fernandez also served as the US CEO for two agencies, Burson-Marsteller (now "BCW") and Llorente y Cuenca (now "LLYC"). He was a full-time professor of practice at Boston University and an adjunct professor at several universities. He currently is the senior vice president of public affairs, communications and sustainability at Enbridge which is headquartered in Calgary, AB, Canada.

== Education ==
Fernandez graduated with a B.A. and an M.S. from Georgetown University.

== Career ==
Fernandez started his career working as press secretary for Senator Ernest Hollings when he was 23 years old and later served as communications executive in various positions at State Farm, ConAgra and Cigna.

He served as Corporate Vice President of Corporate Affairs and as Chief Communications Officer at Cargill, America's largest private company, from 2010-2016.

In October 2016, Fernandez joined Burson-Marsteller, a global public relations and communications firm headquartered in New York City, as Chair of Global Corporate and Financial practice. In 2017, he was then appointed as U.S. CEO. In February, after the merger with Cohn & Wolfe, Fernandez left Burson-Marsteller.

In November 2018, Fernandez replaced Erich de la Fuente as the U.S. CEO at Llorente & Cuenca.

In January 2019, Fernandez and former GE chief communications officer Gary Sheffer launched The Crux of the Story podcast available on iTunes, SoundCloud and Spotify. Among the most listened to communications podcasts in North America its guests have included documentary filmmaker Alex Gibney, Wall Street Journal editor-in-chief Matt Murray, political strategist Steve Schmidt, Fortune Media Group CEO (which includes Fortune magazine) Alan Murray, former Reagan and Obama White House photographer Pete Souza, business school professor and author of INCLUSIFY Dr. Stephanie K. Johnson, and many others - from authors to journalists, marketers and chief communications officers.

In March 2020, Fernandez was named senior vice president of public affairs, communications and sustainability and chief communications officer at Enbridge

== Additional affiliations and memberships ==
Fernandez was an adjunct professor at the George Washington University's Graduate School of Political Management and New York University, and was a professor of strategic communications at Boston University.

He has served on the advisory council of the University of Minnesota's Humphrey School of Public Affairs, has served as trustee for the Minneapolis Institute of Art and as trustee of the Institute for Public Relations and on the boards of several other schools and organizations.

He is a member of the Arthur W. Page Society, where he serves on the leadership subcommittee.

Fernandez also serves as Director of the Public Relations Society of America Foundation.

== Awards and recognitions ==
In 2013 Fernandez received the Plank Center's Milestones in Mentoring Award, and in 2015 he received the Alexandar Hamilton Medal for Lifetime Achievement in PR, which is the Institute for Public Relations' highest award.

In 2016, Fernandez was ranked in the Holmes Report's The Influence 100, listing the 100 "most important and influential in-house communicators from around the world". In the same year he was also awarded the PRSA Foundation's Paladin Award.

Fernandez is also the first recipient of the Hispanic Public Relations Association's Pioneer Award, and was honored in the PRWeek's PR Hall of Fame.
