= Pomp =

Pomp or pomps may refer to:

- POMP, a proteasome maturation protein
- Pomp, Kentucky, a community in the United States
- Pomps, a commune in the Pyrénées-Atlantiques department in southwestern France
- Pompḗ (Ancient Greek: πομπή), usually translated as "pomp" or "procession", the name of the first part of several Ancient Greek festivals, such as Dionysia and Lenaia
- Pomp Peak, a mountain in the United States
- Pomp rock, an alternative term for a rock music era also known as arena rock
- Slang for a Pompadour haircut
- Pomps, an alternative name for a Ghillies dance shoe
- Jubal Pomp, a Walt Disney comics character

== People ==
- Numa Pompilius, also called Numa Pomp (753–673 BC; reigned 715-673 BC), legendary second king of Rome, succeeding Romulus
- Dirck Gerritsz Pomp (1544–1608), Dutch sailor of the 16th–17th century
- Jean Baptiste Charbonneau (1805–1866), explorer and fur trader

== See also ==
- Pomp and Circumstance Marches, a series of marches for orchestra composed by Sir Edward Elgar
- Pomper, a surname
