= Vincent Morgan =

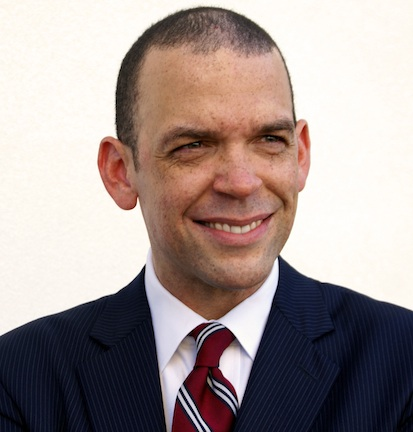
Vincent Morgan, Democrat, Harlem, NYC

Vincent "Vince" Scott Morgan (born April 22, 1969) is a Democratic political activist, community leader and businessman from Harlem, New York.

He was a 2013 Democratic candidate for the New York City Council for the 9th Council District. The 9th district comprises Community Board #10 and parts of CB #9 in Harlem. Morgan also ran for the United States House of Representatives in 2010.

Morgan has signaled his intention to champion the issues of fairness and transparency in the economic matters of the district by calling for an independent audit of the West Harlem Local Development Corporation (WHLDC), an agency charged with overseeing $150 Million community benefits agreement that is part of Columbia University's planned expansion into West Harlem. https://web.archive.org/web/20120211071737/http://www.dnainfo.com/20111031/harlem/candidate-wants-audit-of-columbias-spending-harlem#ixzz1cPt1aHuE

== Early life ==
Morgan was born on April 22, 1969, in Chicago, Illinois. He was the only child born to John Ford (b. May 3, 1942) and Sharon Leslie Morgan (b. January 30, 1951). After his father abandoned the relationship and returned to his hometown in Memphis, TN before Vincent was born., Morgan was raised by his single mother in Chicago's Bronzeville community. He grew up in a tough neighborhood on the South side. Educated in an inner city parochial school (Corpus Christi), he was sheltered from some of the harsh realities of his impoverished community. He dropped out of high school at age 16, but with the support of concerned adults, including his maternal grandmother and his mother, as well as his own sense of determination, he turned his life around.

After obtaining his GED, he went on to attend Howard University in Washington, D.C. Morgan graduated with a bachelor's degree in business management from the University of Illinois at Chicago and earned a master's degree in public administration from Columbia University, in New York.

== Professional life ==
Following college, Morgan embarked on a career in marketing communications and spent three years in South Africa, working in marketing positions with Lucent Technologies and with a South African cellular phone company. He eventually returned to the United States and moved to New York City.

In 2001, he volunteered for service in the Harlem office of Congressman Charles B. Rangel. Based on his meritorious volunteer work, he was offered a staff position as special assistant to the Congressman and, in 2002, was appointed campaign director for the Congressman's successful re-election.

For six years, he served as a vice president and community banking officer for TD Bank. As manager of the Community Reinvestment Act (CRA) compliance for the State of New York and Northern New Jersey, he was responsible for building partnerships in both corporate and not-for-profit sectors.

Morgan has served in numerous leadership positions for New York organizations. In 2007, he created Harlem NOW, a non-partisan group that mobilized the community to solve grassroots issues. As chairman of the 125th Street Business Improvement District (BID), he championed revitalization efforts of one of the world's most famous thoroughfares. He was instrumental in launching Harlem's "Light It Up" campaign to illuminate 125th Street for the 2010 holiday season. The campaign, a model for cooperation among the business, academic, non-profit and political communities in northern Manhattan, garnered global attention.

Morgan has also served as a director on many boards, including Greater Harlem Chamber of Commerce, Theatre of the Riverside Church, Harlem Biennale, International Leadership High School and the advisory boards of Touro College of Osteopathic Medicine and Alianza Dominicana. He is a member of the Alpha Phi Alpha fraternity, a graduate of the FBI Citizens Academy and a member of the NYC Community Emergency Response Team (CERT) in Harlem.

== Personal life ==
Vincent Morgan is married to Shola Lynch, a documentary filmmaker who won a Peabody Award in 2006 for Chisholm '72: Unbought & Unbossed, a film about the first female candidate for the office of the President of the United States of America. Her current film, Free Angela and All Political Prisoners, documents black nationalist icon Angela Davis and has earned critical praise and recognition. The couple lives in the Harlem community of New York City. They are parents of two children, Julian and Violet.

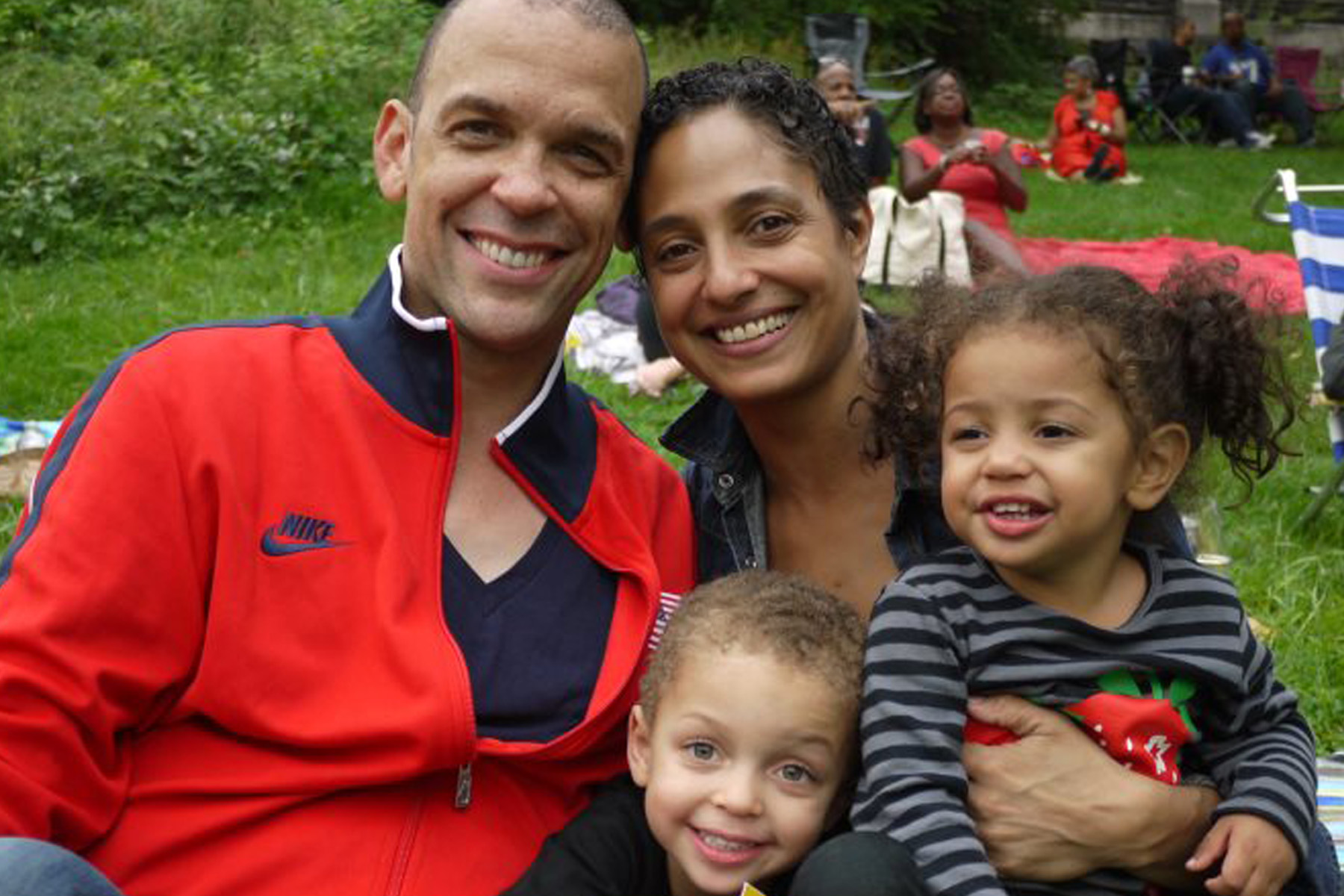
Vince Morgan and his family
