= Brian Pomper =

American lawyer and lobbyist

- Education: Massachusetts Institute of Technology (BS); Cornell Law School (JD)

Brian Pomper is an American lawyer, political strategist and lobbyist and currently serves as partner with Akin Gump Strauss & Feld. He is regarded an expert on international trade and intellectual property rights.

== Early life and education ==
Pomper obtained a B.S. from the Massachusetts Institute of Technology (MIT) and subsequently a J.D. from Cornell Law School. He graduated with honors from Massachusetts and magna cum laude from Cornell.

During his time at MIT, Pomper served as staff member of a university magazine and at Cornell, served as Managing Editor of the Cornell International Law Journal.

== Career ==
Early in his career, Pomper served as a law clerk for Sidney R. Thomas and, from 1997 to 2003, at Skadden, Arps, Slate, Meagher & Flom.

From 2003 to 2006, he then served as a staff member of the U.S. Senate's Finance Committee and in 2005 was nominated by Max Baucus to serve as Chief International Trade Counsel. He also served as Staff Director for Baucus.

In 2006, Pomper then founded Parven Pomper Strategies (PPS), a Democratic lobbying firm, together with Scott Parven. The firm was subsequently acquired by Akin Gump Strauss Hauer & Feld in 2010 and Pomper and his team joined the new firm. Among other clients, Pomper has lobbied for Chevron since 2006. Since 2017, Pomper co-heads the firm's public law and policy practice.

Pomper is considered an expert on international trade issues and is frequently cited in different news outlets as well as speaking at various events. He has also published different pieces in the Wall Street Journal or on blogs like The Hill.

== Additional affiliations and memberships ==
Pomper is a member of the Patent Bar and currently serves as adjunct professor at the George Washington University's Graduate School of Political Management.

Since 2009, he also serves as executive director for the Innovation Alliance, "a coalition of research and development-based technology companies" and serves in the same position at Action for Trade, a network of "trade associations and businesses dedicated to shaping U.S. trade policy".

== Personal life ==
Pomper is married and lives in McLean, Virginia, together with his wife Anne Kim and their sons Alexander and Elliot.
