= Julia Azari =

American political scientist

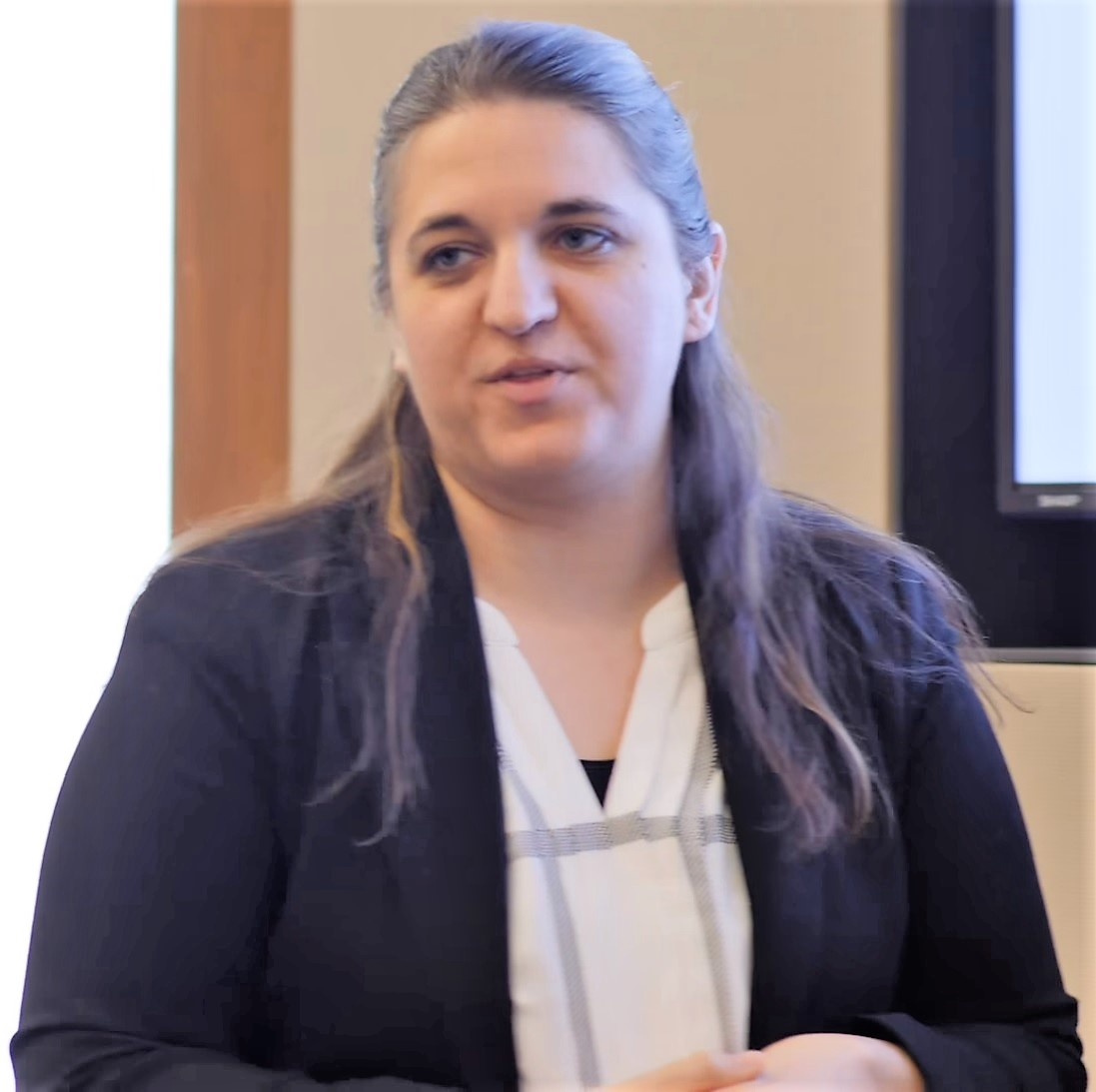
- Azari in 2018
- Education: University of Illinois at Urbana–Champaign (BA); Yale University (MPhil, MA, PhD)
- Awards: Best Public-Facing Scholarship Award, APSA; Founder's Best Paper Award, APSA
- Scientific career
- Fields: Political science
- Institutions: Marquette University

Julia R. Azari is an American political scientist. She is a professor of political science at Marquette University, where she is also the assistant chair of the Department of Political Science. Azari studies the American presidency and political parties in the United States, with particular attention to partisanship in the United States and how these systems have changed since the early 20th century. Azari has contributed to FiveThirtyEight, writes the blog Mischiefs of Faction, and hosts the podcast Politics in Question.

== Education ==
Azari attended the University of Illinois Urbana–Champaign. She originally intended to become a political journalist, but realized that she enjoyed academic political science. She graduated with a Bachelor of Arts degree in political science in 2002. She then received an M.Phil., M.A., and Ph.D. in political science at Yale University.

== Career ==
=== Research ===
In 2014 Azari published the book Delivering the People's Message: The Changing Politics of the Presidential Mandate, which studies the history of the idea of a political mandate for the President of the United States, from Herbert Hoover in 1928 to the election of Barack Obama in 2008. Azari uses content analysis on presidents' communications to analyze how presidents have used the notion of a presidential mandate, showing that over the last several decades presidents have increasingly invoked their mandate to defend the legitimacy of the office.

With William D. Adler, Azari won the 2021 Founder's Best Paper Award from the American Political Science Association for their working paper "The Party Decides (Who the Vice President Will Be)". The Founder's Award "is given for the best paper on executive politics authored by a PhD-holding scholar at the previous year's" meeting of the American Political Science Association.

Some of Azari's work in science communication, including posts on the Mischiefs of Faction blog, have also in turn been cited in academic literature.

=== In the media ===
Azari has been a frequent contributor to the data journalism website FiveThirtyEight since 2016, both as an author of articles and as a guest on the FiveThirtyEight Politics Podcast. Azari regularly writes for Mischiefs of Faction, which was founded as an independent political science blog in 2012, and for a period after 2015 was incorporated into Vox. Azari has also appeared as an expert on television panels and interviews, including appearances on C-SPAN dating back to 2009, as well as on radio stations like Wisconsin Public Radio and KCRW. She has also directed or engaged in public events about politics.

In 2019, Azari was the recipient of the inaugural Best Public-Facing Scholarship Award from the American Political Science Association, which recognizes the "best public-facing scholarship published in the previous calendar year", including "blog posts and popular press publications intended for a broad public audience". Azari has also been recognized for her public discussions of the role and value of political science communication, and the undervaluing of communication work by some of the evaluation criteria commonly used by universities.

In 2020 Azari wrote a series of op-eds in The Washington Post on "how to improve the presidential nominating process". The headline of one of them, "It's time to give the elites a bigger say in choosing the president", was changed after it received backlash.

== Selected works ==
- "Unwritten rules: Informal institutions in established democracies", Perspectives on Politics 10 (1), 37–55, with Jennifer K. Smith (2012)
- Delivering the People's Message: The Changing Politics of the Presidential Mandate (2014)
- "How the news media helped to nominate Trump", Political Communication 33 (4), 677–680 (2016)

== Selected awards ==
- Best Public-Facing Scholarship Award, American Political Science Association (2019)
- Founder's Best Paper Award, American Political Science Association (2019)
