= The Graduate School of Political Management =

Coordinates: 38.898034°N 77.047792°W

- Type: Private
- Established: 1987
- Parent institution: George Washington University
- Dean: Liesl A. Riddle, Ph.D.
- Director: Debbie Mucarsel-Powell
- Location: 805 21st Street, Suite 400, Washington, D.C., 20052, United States
- Campus: Urban—Foggy Bottom
- Website: gspm.gwu.edu

The Graduate School of Political Management (GSPM) at the George Washington University is a school of political management and applied politics, strategic communications and civic engagement. Its graduates hold a variety of professional titles including campaign managers, pollsters, speechwriters, communications professionals, legislative aides and directors, candidates, lobbyists, and new media experts.

It is the only school of applied politics in Washington, D.C. The faculty train students of all political persuasions in how to win campaigns, advance legislative goals and impact public opinion ethically.

== History ==
GSPM was founded in 1987 as an independent graduate school chartered by the New York State Board of Regents, with the understanding that proper politics requires training.

The school's first class convened on the Manhattan campus of Baruch College. In 1991, the school opened a degree program on the urban campus of the George Washington University, in the Foggy Bottom neighborhood, just a few blocks from the White House, Capitol Hill.

The university's Columbian College of Arts and Sciences formally acquired GSPM in 1995. In 2006, the school moved under the College of Professional Studies (CPS), where it is currently located. Designed for working professionals, classes meet in the evenings.

== Campus and facilities ==
GSPM's programs are mainly located in three different areas of Washington, D.C.

- The Political Management courses take place at the George Washington University's Foggy Bottom campus, located in the centre of the city, close to the White House.
- Legislative Affairs programs are located in the Hall of the States building, across from the United States Capitol Complex.
- The Strategic Public Relations master's program is located at George Washington University's's Graduate Education Center

== Organization and administration ==
GSPM is administratively housed within the GW's College of Professional Studies. It is supported by a Board of Advisors, which is composed of officials and experts from varying backgrounds, including politics, media, communications and others.

== Academics ==
GSPM offers 3 master's programs and 6 graduate certificates. The current master's programs are Political Management, Legislative Affairs, and Public Relations and Communications. The Political Management and Strategic Public Relations master's degrees are availably as fully online programs.

=== Research centers ===
The Global Center for Political Management is the school's research department. It focuses on public opinion survey data through the Society of Presidential Pollsters, as well as the George Washington University Battleground Poll.

The school researches the use of social media through its Public Echoes Of Rhetoric In America (PEORIA) Project, which uses data from Twitter to explore how campaign messages are developed and spread through social media.

=== Rankings ===
GSPM's master's degree program in Strategic Public Relations was named PRWeek's PR Education Program of the Year in 2015.
