= List of political scientists =

The following is a list of notable political scientists. Political science is the scientific study of politics, a social science dealing with systems of governance and power.

== A ==
- Robert Abelson – Yale University psychologist and political scientist with special interests in statistics and logic
- Henry J. Abraham – American scholar on the judiciary and constitutional law and James Hart Professor of Government Emeritus at the University of Virginia
- Alan Abramowitz – expert in American politics, political parties, ideological realignment, elections, and voting behavior; professor at Emory University
- Paul R. Abramson – American political scientist known for his research and writing on American, European, and Israeli elections and professor of political science at Michigan State University
- Ibrahim Abu-Lughod – Palestinian-American academic and professor for political science at Northwestern University for 34 years
- As'ad AbuKhalil – Lebanese-American professor of political science at California State University, Stanislaus
- Martha Ackelsberg – American political scientist and women's studies scholar at Smith College
- Brooke Ackerly – expert on grounded normative theory, feminist theory, feminist international relations, and scholar activism, professor at Vanderbilt University
- David Adamany – public law specialist and president of Temple University
- Charles R. Adrian – American professor of political science who specialized in municipal politics
- Vinod Aggarwal – American political scientist specializing in international political economy
- Robert Agranoff – American political scientist and public administration scholar and author
- Arun Agrawal – political scientist in the School of Natural Resources & Environment at the University of Michigan
- Eqbal Ahmed – Pakistani political scientist and Third World scholar
- Janet Ajzenstat – Canadian political historian at McMaster University
- Adeolu Akande – professor of political science at the Igbinedion University
- Bolaji Akinyemi – Nigerian professor of political science
- Bethany Albertson – American political psychologist
- Daniel P. Aldrich – American political scientist, public policy and Asian studies scholar at Northeastern University
- John Aldrich – political parties expert at Duke University, author of Why Parties?
- John R. Alford – political science professor at Rice University who researches genopolitics
- Hayward Alker – professor of international relations at the University of Southern California, MIT and Yale who specialized in research methods, core international relations theory, international politics, and security
- Danielle Allen – American classicist and political scientist
- Graham Allison – early proponent of the bureaucratic politics model, author of Essence of Decision, national security specialist, former dean of Harvard Kennedy School at Harvard University
- Gabriel Almond – originator of the culturist movement in comparative politics
- Gar Alperovitz – political economist
- Karen Alter – American academic who conducts interdisciplinary work on international law's influence in international and domestic politics
- Scott Althaus – professor of political science and communication at the University of Illinois at Urbana-Champaign and the director of the Cline Center for Advanced Social Research at the university
- Micah Altman – American social scientist who conducts research in social science informatics
- R. Michael Alvarez – professor of political science at California Institute of Technology and co-director of the Voting Technology Project
- Tabata Amaral – Brazilian political scientist and federal deputy for São Paulo
- Ambedkar – jurist, economist and chairman of the Drafting Committee of the Constitution of India
- Thomas Ambrosio – professor of political science in the Criminal Justice and Political Science Department at North Dakota State University
- Kristi Andersen – American political scientist at Syracuse University who studies party realignment
- Walter K. Andersen – American academic known for his studies of the Hindu nationalist organization Rashtriya Swayamsevak Sangh
- Benedict Anderson – Chinese-born Irish political scientist and historian in the US, author of Imagined Communities
- Lisa Anderson – American political scientist and former president of the American University in Cairo
- Walter Truett Anderson – American political scientist, social psychologist, and author of non-fiction books and articles
- William Anderson – specialist in public administration
- Mina Andreeva – Bulgarian political scientist and chief spokesperson for the European Commission
- Marimba Ani – anthropologist and African Studies scholar best known for her work Yurugu
- Stephen Ansolabehere – professor of government at Harvard University
- William Antholis – Greek-American political scientist, director and CEO of the Miller Center of Public Affairs at the University of Virginia
- David Apter – American political scientist and sociologist; Henry J. Heinz Professor of Comparative Political and Social Development and senior research scientist at Yale University
- Asher Arian – American and Israeli political scientist; expert on politics of Israel and election studies
- Hadley Arkes – American political scientist and the Edward N. Ney Professor of Jurisprudence and American Institutions emeritus at Amherst College
- John Alexander Armstrong – professor emeritus of political science at the University of Wisconsin-Madison
- Larry Arnhart – Distinguished Research Professor Emeritus of Political Science at Northern Illinois University
- Richard Ashcraft – American political theorist and professor of political science at UCLA
- Herb Asher – professor emeritus of political science at Ohio State University
- Richard K. Ashley – postmodernist scholar of international relations
- Ronald Asmus – diplomat and political analyst and then senior think tank policy analyst
- Scott Atran – American-French political and cultural anthropologist
- Sharon Wright Austin – director of the African-American Studies Program, professor of political science at the University of Florida
- Deborah Avant – American political scientist at the University of Denver
- Bill Avery – politician from the state of Nebraska and retired political scientist who specializes in international trade and foreign relations
- Robert Axelrod – expert on game theory and complexity theory, wrote extensively on the Prisoner's Dilemma, former president of American Political Science Association
- Julia Azari – American political scientist, professor of political science at Marquette University and contributor to FiveThirtyEight
- Jeremy Azrael – American political scientist known for his expertise on the economy of the Soviet Union

== B ==
- Andrew Bacevich – American historian specializing in international relations, security studies, American foreign policy, and American diplomatic and military history
- Gawdat Bahgat – professor of political science at the National Defense University
- Kathleen Cordelia Bailey
- Fatih Baja – Gar Yunis University teacher and member of the National Transitional Council in charge of political affairs
- Susan Baker – Irish scholar of environmental governance in the European Union and ecofeminism, gender and the environment at Cardiff University
- Lisa Baldez – American political scientist and scholar of Latin American Studies
- Michel Balinski – American and French applied mathematician, economist, operations research analyst and political scientist
- Tijjani Muhammad Bande – Nigerian political scientist permanent representative of Nigeria to the UN and former president of UNGA
- Moniz Bandeira – Brazilian writer, professor, political scientist, historian and poet
- Mary Jo Bane – Thornton Bradshaw Professor at Harvard Kennedy School; former the Malcolm Wiener Professor of Social Policy and director of the Malcolm Wiener Center for Social Policy
- Edward C. Banfield
- Benjamin Barber – proponent of participatory democracy and local governance teaching at the University of Maryland School of Public Policy
- James David Barber – developed a classification system of the personality types of American presidents
- Stephen Barber – noted for his work on political strategy and political economy, author of Political Strategy
- Line Bareiro – Paraguayan political scientist, civil rights activist and feminist
- Joel Barkan (1941–2014) – American political scientist with an expertise in political development in Africa
- Lucius Barker (1928–2020) – Edna Fischel Gellhorn Professor and chair of the political science department at Washington University in St. Louis, then the William Bennett Munro Professor of Political Science at Stanford University
- Mohammed Barkindo – Nigerian political scientists and petroleum economist; secretary general of OPEC
- Michael Barkun – professor emeritus of political science at Maxwell School of Citizenship and Public Affairs, Syracuse University, specializing in political and religious extremism and the relationship between religion and violence
- A. Doak Barnett (1921–1999) – American political scientist known for his expertise on U.S.-China relations and Chinese politics
- Michael Barnett – specialist in international relations
- Thomas P.M. Barnett – security strategist
- Simion Bărnuţiu – noted for his work on political strategy in Austria and Romania
- Bethany Barratt – political scientist researching global human rights and ethics in international relations; works at Roosevelt University
- Matt A. Barreto – professor at UCLA focusing on Latino political behavior, voting rights, and public opinion; co-founded the UCLA Voting Rights Project
- David M. Barrett – professor at Villanova University specializing in U.S. intelligence and foreign policy during the Cold War
- Larry Bartels – democracy and voting expert at Vanderbilt University
- Robert V. Bartlett – political scientist at the University of Vermont, known for environmental policy and sustainability research
- Gad Barzilai – Law and Politics, Human Rights and Politics, Communities and Law at University of Washington
- Sylvia Bashevkin – Canadian scholar of women and politics
- Stephen Baskerville – scholar examining political aspects of family law and its social impact, including custody and divorce systems
- Amrita Basu – professor at Amherst College specializing in South Asian politics and feminist movements, known for works like Violent Conjunctures in Democratic India
- Robert Bates – Harvard professor focusing on comparative politics and African development, notable for his analysis of political institutions and agricultural policy
- Frank Baumgartner – political scientist at UNC-Chapel Hill, known for research on policy processes and agenda-setting theories, such as co-authoring Agendas and Instability in American Politics
- Phineas Baxandall – scholar with research interests in public finance and transportation policy, contributing to governmental budgeting practices
- David H. Bayley – criminologist at SUNY Albany known for studies on policing and international criminal justice reform
- Elmira Bayrasli – expert on global entrepreneurship and innovation, co-founder of Foreign Policy Interrupted, and author of From the Other Side of the World
- Robert J. Beck – professor focusing on international law and the use of force, contributing to legal and ethical debates in global politics
- Holmes Beckwith (1884–1921) – economist and academic specializing in fiscal policy and public finance, known for his contributions to economic theory
- Francis Beer – political scientist who received his M.A. from Berkeley and A.B. from Harvard; explored language and metaphors in international relations, and their role in conflict and peace
- Samuel Beer (1911–2009) – Harvard professor specializing in British politics and federalism, focused mainly on comparative political studies
- Edward Beiser – constitutional scholar and law professor at Brown University, recognized for his work in medical ethics
- Linda Royster Beito – professor and dean at Stillman College, co-author of T.R.M. Howard: Doctor, Entrepreneur, and Civil Rights Pioneer
- Charles Beitz – political theorist at Princeton University, known for contributions to international justice and human rights theory
- Adolphus G. Belk Jr. – professor at Winthrop University specializing in African American politics, public policy, and race relations
- Aaron Belkin – political scientist focusing on gender, sexuality, and military policy, particularly through his work on LGBT rights in the military
- Alon Ben-Meir – Middle East expert, advocating for peace and conflict resolution, with extensive writings on Arab-Israeli relations
- Daniel Benjamin – diplomat and academic expert in counterterrorism, serving as the State Department's coordinator for counterterrorism 2009–2012
- Mounia Bennani-Chraïbi – Moroccan political scientist, author and professor at the University of Lausanne
- Linda L. M. Bennett – American political scientist and former president of Indiana University; focused on higher education policy and university administration
- W. Lance Bennett – professor at the University of Washington, specializing in political communication and civic engagement, and author of influential works on digital media's role in democracy
- William Benoit – scholar in communication studies, developed the functional theory of political campaign discourse and has published extensively on political communication
- Myriam Benraad – French political scientist focusing on Middle Eastern politics, with expertise in jihadism and political violence in Iraq
- Richard Bensel – political scientist at Cornell University known for his work on the political economy of the United States and historical institutionalism
- Arthur F. Bentley (1870–1957) – American political philosopher who emphasized group theory in political science, author of The Process of Government
- Suzanne Berger – professor at MIT, specializing in comparative politics and industrial policy, with influential research on globalization's effects on economies
- Adam Berinsky – political science professor at MIT, focusing on political behavior and public opinion, particularly in misinformation and media influence
- Peter Berkowitz – scholar in political theory, specializing in liberalism and constitutional law; senior fellow at the Hoover Institution
- Ilan Berman – vice president of the American Foreign Policy Council, focusing on security and geopolitical issues, particularly in the Middle East and Iran
- Marshall Berman – philosopher and Marxist humanist, known for his work All That Is Solid Melts into Air, exploring modernity and urban culture
- Sheri Berman – professor at Barnard College, focusing on European politics, democracy, and the role of political parties in societal transformation
- Nancy Bermeo – political scientist at Princeton University, her research delves into democratization, political violence, and inequality
- William D. Berry – professor at Florida State University, renowned for his contributions to quantitative political methodology
- Michele Betsill – political scientist specializing in environmental governance and climate change policy, based at Colorado State University
- Richard K. Betts – prize-winning author in a number of political science areas
- Mark Bevir – professor of political science and director of the Center for British Studies at the University of California, Berkeley
- Seweryn Bialer (1926–2019) – political scientist specializing in Soviet and Russian studies; professor at Columbia University; published seminal works on Soviet political elites, including Stalin's Successors (1980) and The Soviet Paradox (1986)
- Thomas J. Biersteker – professor at the Graduate Institute of International and Development Studies in Geneva, Biersteker is known for his work on international political economy, particularly regarding the impact of international sanctions on state behavior
- Leonard Binder – professor at the University of Chicago; known for his studies on Middle Eastern politics, especially in Egypt, and his influential work The Ideology of Arab Politics
- Sarah Binder – professor at George Washington University; recognized for her research on legislative politics, including U.S. Congress; has published on political parties, policymaking, and gridlock
- Sarah Birch – professor in comparative politics at King's College London
- Thomas A. Birkland – professor at North Carolina State University; known for his work on public policy, mainly the study of disaster policy and how crises affect policy decisions; author of Lessons of Disaster
- Rachel Bitecofer – political scientist specializing in American elections; known for her work on voter behavior and political forecasting
- Duncan Black – spatial voting theorist
- Earl Black – political scientist at Rice University; focuses on Southern politics and American political behavior, contributing extensively to studies of party systems and electoral trends
- Merle Black – political scientist with a focus on American politics and the South; known for his research on political realignment and public opinion
- Chris Blattman – professor at the University of Chicago; studies global conflict, poverty, and violence, focusing on developing countries like Uganda and Colombia
- Hans T. Blokland – author of Freedom and Culture in Western Society and Modernization and its Political Consequences
- Jean Blondel – comparative politics at University of Siena, emeritus at European University Institute
- Lincoln P. Bloomfield – professor emeritus who contributed to American foreign policy analysis and conflict resolution studies
- Virgil Blum – political scientist known for his contributions to international relations and U.S. foreign policy studies
- Mark Blyth – professor at Brown University; specializes in political economy and macroeconomics, particularly on the influence of finance
- Lawrence Bobo – professor at Harvard University; focuses on race, ethnicity, and American political behavior, particularly the intersection of race and politics in the U.S.
- Alan Bock – journalist and political commentator known for his work on U.S. politics and foreign policy
- Sophie Body-Gendrot – French political scientist with expertise in urban violence and public policy in cities
- Vernon Bogdanor – British political scientist at King's College London, known for his work on British politics, the constitution, and public administration
- B. Anthony Bogues – professor at Brown University; works on issues of race, empire, and political theory, focusing on the Caribbean and its global context
- Jean-Charles de Borda – 18th-century mathematician who devised the Borda count
- David Bositis – political analyst and scholar specializing in African American politics and public opinion
- Eileen Hunt Botting – political theorist focused on the history of political thought, feminist theory, and environmental justice
- Catherine Boone – political scientist known for her research on state development, ethnic politics, and the political economy of Africa
- Ammar Bouhouche – Algerian political and military leader and academic political scientist
- Terry Bouricius – expert on political campaigns, public policy, and Vermont politics, particularly the impact of reform movements on local governance
- Donna Lee Bowen – scholar focused on comparative politics, specifically Middle East politics and political development in postcolonial societies
- Shaun Bowler – political scientist who examines political behavior, public opinion, and voting systems, particularly in the U.S. and Europe
- Janet M. Box-Steffensmeier – prominent scholar in American politics, known for her work on political methodology and the study of political behavior
- Mark A. Boyer – focuses on international relations, comparative politics, and political institutions, particularly in the context of war and conflict
- Jules Boykoff – specializes in the politics of sport, with a focus on media, political protests, and activism
- Paul Bracken – scholar in international security, specializing in nuclear strategy, global military affairs, and international political economy
- David W. Brady – known for research on American political institutions, political parties, and election studies
- Henry E. Brady – political scientist focused on American political behavior, public opinion, and political parties
- Ralph Braibanti – known for his work on South Asian politics and comparative political systems
- Steven Brams – expert on voting systems
- Laurie Brand – specializes in Middle Eastern politics and international relations, particularly issues related to state sovereignty and political economy
- Paul Brass – scholar of comparative politics, focusing on ethnic politics, political violence, and Indian politics
- Ahron Bregman – expert on the Arab–Israeli conflict
- Ian Bremmer – political risk specialist
- Emma Briant – expert on propaganda and information warfare, associate professor of News and Political Communication at Monash University
- Janine Brodie – Distinguished University Professor and Canada Research Chair of Political Economy and Social Governance at the University of Alberta
- Stephen Brooks – international relations scholar
- Lara Brown – American political scientist and director of the Graduate School of Political Management at the George Washington University
- Nadia E. Brown – uses intersectionality to study identity politics, legislative studies, and Black women's studies
- Robert X. Browning – specialist in American politics and chief archivist for C-SPAN
- Zbigniew Brzezinski – Polish-American political scientist, geostrategist, and statesman
- Bruce Bueno de Mesquita – pioneering game theorist with applications to international relations, author of selectorate theory
- Ralph Bunche – American political scientist and diplomat; received the 1950 Nobel Peace Prize for his late 1940s mediation in Palestine
- Walter Dean Burnham – expert in the field of realigning elections, emeritus at University of Texas at Austin
- David Butler – pioneer of modern British political science, invented the concept of swing

== C ==
- William A. Callahan
- Melani Cammett – Clarence Dillon Professor of International Affairs and director of the Weatherhead Center for International Affairs, Harvard University
- Linda Cardinal – University Professor, Canada Research Chair in Canadian Francophonie and Public Policies at the University of Ottawa
- Ira Carmen – co-founder of the social science subdiscipline of genetics and politics
- Edward Hallett Carr – international relations theorist
- Niambi Carter – political scientist and author
- Alfredo Castillero Hoyos – democracy and human rights; former member of the United Nations's Human Rights Committee
- George Catlin (1896–1979) – English political scientist and philosopher; strong proponent of Anglo-America cooperation; worked for many years as a professor at Cornell University
- Jocelyne Cesari – French political scientist
- Pamela Chasek – international environmental policy expert
- Partha Chatterjee – Indian postcolonial critic, political and social scientist
- Rumman Chowdhury – Bengali-American political scientist and data scientist at Accenture
- Satyabrata Rai Chowdhuri – international relations, Indology at Institute of Commonwealth Studies
- Walter C. Clemens – associate at Harvard Davis Center for Russian and European Studies and professor emeritus of Political Science, Boston University, author of books on US relations with Russia, China and North Korea, and science and world affairs
- Cathryn Clüver Ashbrook – director and CEO of the German Council on Foreign Relations; co-founder and executive director of the Future of Diplomacy project, at Harvard University's Belfer Center for Science and International Affairs
- John Coakley – specialist in ethnic conflict and Irish politics
- Benjamin Cohen – leader in the field of international political economy
- Elizabeth F. Cohen – American expert on citizenship and immigration
- Stephen P. Cohen – Middle East specialist
- James Smoot Coleman – early Africanist, founded the UCLA African Studies Center
- Ralph W. Conant – author of The Prospects for Revolution and Toward a More Perfect Union: The Governance of Metropolitan America
- Marquis de Condorcet – 18th-century mathematician and philosopher who contributed the often used "Condorcet criterion" and devised the concept of a Condorcet method
- Philip Converse – public opinion scholar, author of The Nature of Belief Systems in Mass Publics
- Timothy E. Cook – politics and media
- Clyde Coombs – voting systems expert, designed "Coombs' method"
- Morgan Lyon Cotti – professor, associate director of the Hinckley Institute of Politics
- Philip Cowley – author of Revolts and Rebellions
- Edvin Kanka Ćudić – Bosnian political scientist and human rights activist, founder and coordinator of UDIK in Bosnia and Herzegovina

== D ==
- Alison Dagnes – American specialist in politics and the media, politics and humor, and political scandal
- Robert A. Dahl – American politics specialist, author of On Democracy
- Rafaela Dancygier – expert in comparative politics, especially the implications of ethnic diversity in democracies; IBM Chair of International Studies at Princeton University
- Jouke de Vries – Frisian politician and professor at the university of Leiden
- Vera Micheles Dean – Russian American political scientist, former head of research for the Foreign Policy Association, and leading international affairs authority in the 1940s and 1950s
- Ronald Deibert – Canadian political scientist and founder and director of the Citizen Lab at the University of Toronto
- Fatima Denton – Ethiopian political scientist, officer-in-charge of the Special Initiatives Division and co-ordinator for the African Climate Policy Centre of the United Nations Economic Commission for Africa
- Daniel Deudney – writer and associate professor at Johns Hopkins University; author of Bounding Power: Republican Security Theory from the Polis to the Global Village
- Karl Deutsch – political scientist, focused on political communication
- Larry Diamond – comparative democratization specialist; professor at Stanford University
- Thomas Diez – chair of International Relations at the University of Birmingham
- Michelle Dion – professor in the department of political science and the Senator William McMaster Chair of Gender and Methodology at McMaster University
- John DiIulio – American politics expert at the University of Pennsylvania
- Ruth Dixon – winner of the Louis Brownlow Book Award of the National Academy of Public Administration and the W. J. M. Mackenzie award of the Political Studies Association
- Charles Lutwidge Dodgson (also known as Lewis Carroll) – author of Alice in Wonderland and professor of mathematics at the University of Oxford; devised Dodgson's method of voting
- Robert Donaldson – professor at University of Tulsa and specialist in US/Russian foreign policy
- Anthony Downs – contributed to democratic theory, elections studies
- Donald Downs – professor at University of Wisconsin; researcher for Independent Institute
- Michael W. Doyle – international relations theorist, author of Empires
- Daniel Drezner – professor at Tufts University, specializing in international politics
- James Druckman – professor at the University of Rochester, specializing in U.S. public opinion and political behavior
- Murray Dry – professor at Middlebury College, specializing in constitutional law
- John Dryzek – professor at the Australian National University, specializing in deliberative democracy and environmental politics
- John Dunn – political theorist at the University of Cambridge
- Maurice Duverger – French lawyer and sociologist responsible for Duverger's law
- Rand Dyck – Canadian politics expert and professor at Carleton University
- Thomas R. Dye – elite theory vs. pluralism; author of The Irony of Democracy and Who's Running America?

== E ==
- David Easton – originator of systemic theory
- Susan Eaton – American political scientist and workers' rights activist
- Daniel J. Elazar – American federalism and political culture scholar, founder of the Jerusalem Center for Public Affairs, political science professor at Bar Ilan (Israel) and Temple University
- Keisha Lynne Ellis – Bahamian political scientist
- Jean Bethke Elshtain – American political philosopher focusing on gender, ethics, American democracy, and international relations
- Jon Elster – Norwegian social and political theorist; authored works in the philosophy of social science and rational choice theory; notable proponent of Analytical Marxism
- Jadwiga Emilewicz – Polish politician, political scientist, and government minister
- Cynthia Enloe – international relations scholar focusing on feminism in international relations, editor for such scholarly journals as Signs and the International Feminist Journal of Politics
- Kate Ervine – Canadian political science professor

== F ==
- C. Christine Fair – American political scientist who studies counter-terrorism and South Asian topics
- James D. Fearon – American political scientist focusing on theory of civil wars, international bargaining, war's inefficiency puzzle and audience costs
- Peter D. Feaver – international security expert
- Dafydd Fell – British political scientist
- David Fellman – Constitutional scholar
- Richard Fenno – Congress scholar, author of Home Style: House Members in their Districts
- Thomas Ferguson – politics and economics
- Joel S. Fetzer – comparative politics specialist; distinguished professor at Pepperdine University
- Samuel Finer – academic and author on political science and history of government
- Norman Finkelstein – author on political science, notable for The Holocaust Industry
- Martha Finnemore – international relations and international organizations scholar
- Morris P. Fiorina – American politics; proposed retrospective vote theory
- Peter Fishburn – operations analysis and probability theory expert
- Keith Fitzgerald – immigration politics expert
- Naika Foroutan – German political scientist studying immigration and integration
- James H. Fowler – expert on political participation, the evolution of cooperation, and social network theory (UCSD)
- Annette Baker Fox – international relations scholar
- William T. R. Fox – international relations theorist, coiner of the term "superpower"
- Ernst Fraenkel – German political scientist and one of the founding fathers of German political science after World War II
- Daniel P. Franklin – American politics; politics of the presidency and Politics and Film
- Doris Fuchs – German political scientist and professor of International Relations and Sustainable Development at the University of Münster
- Francis Fukuyama – international political theory and biopolitics
- Archon Fung

== G ==
- Michael Gallagher
- Lisa García Bedolla – UC Berkeley professor, vice provost for Graduate Studies, and dean of the Graduate Division
- Krenar Gashi – Ghent University political scientist and former Financial Times reporter
- Scott Gates – specialist in international relations
- Barbara Geddes – scholar of authoritarianism and authoritarian regimes
- Anthony Giddens – political sociologist originator of the Third Way
- Elisabeth Gidengil – Hiram Mills Professor of political science at McGill University studying political engagement and Canadian politics
- Robert Gilpin – international political economy specialist
- Benjamin Ginsberg – professor at Johns Hopkins University focusing on American politics
- Hannes Hólmsteinn Gissurarson – professor of Political Science at the University of Iceland focusing on political theory
- Marianne Githens – political scientist, feminist, author, professor, and co-founder of the Women's Study Program at Goucher College
- Betty Glad – American researcher of the American presidency and American foreign policy
- Siri Gloppen – Norwegian political scientist
- Sheldon Goldman – expert on American federal courts; professor at the University of Massachusetts Amherst
- Grigorii Golosov – expert on political institutions and electoral systems, professor at European University at Saint Petersburg
- David F. Gordon – political risk specialist, former US director of Policy Planning
- Harold Foote Gosnell – research and writings on American politics, elections, and political parties in political science
- Marie Gottschalk – American political scientist known for her work on mass incarceration in the United States
- Heather Grabbe – political scientist, activist, and director of the Open Society European Policy Institute in Brussels, Belgium
- Doris Graber – American pioneer in the field of political communication
- Colin Gray – international security
- Donald Green – professor of Political Science at Columbia University focusing on field experiments in American politics
- Jane Green – professor of political science at the University of Manchester; co-director of the British Election Study; specialised in public opinion and electoral behaviour
- Liah Greenfeld – Israeli, American, and Russian social scientist
- Anna Grzymala – American political scientist, currently at Stanford University; previously Ronald Eileen Weiser Professor at University of Michigan
- Rhiana Gunn-Wright – American policy director
- Yaprak Gürsoy – Turkish political scientist and associate professor in the Department of International Relations at the Istanbul Bilgi University
- Ted Robert Gurr – specialist on conflict and violence
- Amy Gutmann – political theory expert; president of the University of Pennsylvania (2004–present)

== H ==
- Michael Haas – emeritus professor of Political Science, University of Hawai'i
- Jacob Hacker – professor of Political Science at Yale University
- Henrike Hahn – German political scientist and politician; member of the European Parliament
- Paul Y. Hammond – American foreign policy and national security specialist at University of Pittsburgh and elsewhere
- Roger D. Hansen – American political scientist and professor
- Harry Harding – China specialist
- Thomas Hare – devised single transferable vote (also known as Hare's method)
- Jeremy Harris – American politics specialist
- Michael Hart – British twentieth-century politics specialist
- Louis Hartz – American author of The Liberal Tradition in America
- Mary Hawkesworth – American political scientist and Distinguished Professor of Political Science and Women's and Gender Studies at Rutgers University
- Colin Hay – influential British political scientist
- Katharine Hayhoe – atmospheric scientist and professor of political science at Texas Tech University and director of the Climate Science Center
- Clarissa Rile Hayward – professor at Washington University in St. Louis studying the theory of political power and political identities
- Susan Hekman – professor of political science and director of the graduate humanities program at the University of Texas at Arlington
- Marc Hetherington – author of Why Trust Matters; offered a new participation paradigm
- Christopher J. Hill – international relations scholar, professor and director of the Cambridge Centre of International Studies
- Roger Hilsman – aide to John F. Kennedy, Columbia University professor, and prolific author
- Nancy Hirschmann – professor of Politics at the University of Pennsylvania working in the intersection of political theory and public policy
- Sara Hobolt – Danish political scientist who specialises in European politics and electoral behaviour
- Thomas Holbrook – public opinion and elections research, author Do Campaigns Matter?
- Christopher Hood – author of The Art of the State and A Government that Worked Better and Cost Less?
- Donald L. Horowitz – pioneered political science models for assessing ethnic conflict
- Mala Htun – studied women's rights and the politics of race and ethnicity in a comparative context
- Evelyne Huber – studies democracy and redistribution with a focus on Latin America
- Mark Huddleston – former president of Ohio Wesleyan University and president of the University of New Hampshire
- Samuel P. Huntington – author of Clash of Civilizations and The Third Wave: Democratization in the Late Twentieth Century; comparativist

== I ==
- Kancha Ilaiah – Dalit scholar and social scientist
- Ronald Inglehart – professor at the University of Michigan; founder of the World Values Survey
- Shanto Iyengar – American political scientist

== J ==
- Lawrence R. Jacobs – American political scientist; founder and director of the Center for the Study of Politics and Governance at the University of Minnesota
- Gary Jacobson – constitutional law expert
- Ashley E. Jardina – American political scientist and assistant professor of political science at Duke University
- Attahiru Jega – Nigerian political scientist specialising in political development; former INEC chairman; former vice chancellor of Bayero University
- Robert Jervis – international security specialist
- Chalmers Johnson – comparative theorist
- Jason A. Johnson – campaign management
- Loch K. Johnson – United States intelligence expert
- Timothy R. Johnson – political science and law; noted for his work covering the Supreme Court of the United States
- Charles O. Jones – specialist in American politics
- Bertrand de Jouvenel – French political scientist; co-founder of Mont Pelerin Society

== K ==
- Kelly Kadera – professor at University of Iowa studying international relations, democratic backsliding, and gender in politics using dynamic models
- Alice Kang – professor at University of Nebraska at Lincoln, expert in African politics and gender research
- Nazokat Kasimova – Uzbekistani political scientist, also noted for her work within the field of higher education reform
- Nina Kasniunas – author and the Arsht Professor in Ethics and Leadership at Goucher College
- Nancy Kassop – professor at the State University of New York at New Paltz
- Peter Katzenstein – professor at Cornell, former president of the American Political Science Association
- Ira Katznelson – specialist in American and comparative politics
- Dennis Kavanagh
- Michael Keating – specialist in nationalism, European integration and regionalism
- Margaret Keck – developed the study of international activist movements and networked advocacy
- Edmond Keller – specialist in African politics
- Willmoore Kendall – political theorist; teacher of William F. Buckley, Jr.
- Robert O. Keohane – interdependence theory author
- Ben Kerkvliet – specialist in comparative politics
- Cornelius Kerwin – former president of American University
- V.O. Key, Jr. – elections, parties and public opinion scholar
- Laleh Khalili – Iranian American and professor in Middle Eastern politics at the School of Oriental and African Studies
- Ilona Kickbusch – German political scientist best known for her contribution to health promotion and global health
- Gary King – professor at Harvard, political methodologist
- John W. Kingdon – specialist in American politics
- Grayson L. Kirk – specialist in international relations and president of Columbia University
- Henry Kissinger – former secretary of state and National Security advisor to President Richard M. Nixon
- Herbert Kitschelt – author on new radical right parties
- Samara Klar – professor and founder of Women Also Know Stuff
- Stephen D. Krasner – international regimes author, director of Policy Planning under Secretary of State Condoleezza Rice, and professor at Stanford University
- Michael Krassa – elections, social context, architecture and society; lobbyist, consultant, political sociologist at the University of Illinois at Urbana–Champaign
- Oskar Krejčí – theory of international relations, elections and political psychology, former advisor to two Czechoslovak premieres
- Sarah Kreps – foreign and defense policy, nuclear proliferation, and government transparency
- James Kurth
- Will Kymlicka – originated the theoretical foundations of multiculturalism

== L ==
- Guy Laforest – liberalism (John Locke) scholar; Quebec and Canadian politics specialist
- Celinda Lake – American survey methodologist, pollster, and political strategist
- Enid Lakeman – British political reformer, writer and politician, noted for her long-standing championship of the single transferable vote system of elections
- Laura Langbein – American quantitative methodologist and professor of public administration and policy at American University
- Harold Lasswell – political communications, pioneered early efforts to establish the policy sciences and influential contributor to the stages heuristic
- Adria Lawrence – American political scientist and the Aronson Associate Professor of International Studies and Political Science at Johns Hopkins University
- Jack Layton – former leader of the New Democratic Party of Canada, Ph.D. in Political Science
- Richard Ned Lebow – constructivist, Cold War expert, author of Tragic Vision of Politics
- Noémi Lefebvre – French political scientist at the Instituts d'études politiques of Grenoble II
- Michael Leifer – international relations, South Asian Studies, London School of Economics
- Amy E. Lerman – scholar of public opinion, race, and political behaviour; Michelle Schwartz Professor of Public Policy at the University of California Berkeley
- Margaret Levi – scholar of comparative political economy, labor politics, democratic theory, former American Political Science Association president
- Carl Levy – Goldsmiths College, University of London
- Michael Lewis-Beck – American political scientist, scholar of comparative politics, political forecasting, and political methodology, F. Wendell Miller Distinguished Professor of Political Science at the University of Iowa
- Robert C. Lieberman – scholar of American politics and former provost of Johns Hopkins University
- Arend Lijphart – originator of consociationalism
- Fernando Limongi – professor in the São Paulo School of Economics at the Fundação Getúlio Vargas
- Juan Linz – democracy specialist
- Dan Lipinski – U.S. House of Representatives (IL-D, 3rd)
- Seymour Martin Lipset – political theorist on democracy and development and parties; taught at Stanford University
- Leslie Lipson – scholar of comparative politics and democracy at UC Berkeley
- Ramon Llull – discoverer of Condorcet Criterion and Borda Count
- Claudia López Hernández – Colombian political scientist and politician; senator of the Republic of Colombia
- Theodore Lowi – major scholar of American politics at Cornell University
- Ian Lustick – state territoriality ethnic conflict and computer modelling in political science; University of Pennsylvania

== M ==
- Niccolò Machiavelli – considered the originator of historically based political science; author of The Prince
- Beatriz Magaloni – political scientist at Stanford University
- Pia Mancini – political scientist, activist and technical project leader from Argentina
- Jane Mansbridge – scholar of social movements, gender, and democratic engagement (Harvard University), former American Political Science Association president
- Harvey C. Mansfield – political philosophy (Harvard University)
- Zeev Maoz – Arab-Israeli conflict and international relations expert
- Jose M. Maravall – political economist
- Helen Margetts – former director of the Oxford Internet Institute; current director of the Public Policy Programme at the Alan Turing Institute
- David Marsh – influential British political scientist
- Joanna Marszałek-Kawa – Polish lawyer, political scientist, professor and lecturer at the Faculty of Political Science of Nicolaus Copernicus University in Toruń
- Juraj Marusiak – Slovak expert for Central and Eastern Europe
- David R. Mayhew – U.S. legislative behavior and political parties expert
- Amy Mazur – American political scientist and professor at Washington State University
- Tara McCormack – lecturer in international relations at the University of Leicester
- John McCormick – specialist in European Union politics
- John McCormick – American political scientist and Karl J. Weintraub Professor at the University of Chicago
- Rose McDermott – professor of International Relations at Brown University
- Michael McFaul – Russia specialist, professor and director of the Center on Democracy, Development, and the Rule of Law at Stanford University
- John McGarry – ethnic conflict specialist
- J. Patrice McSherry – professor of political science at Long Island University
- John Mearsheimer – international relations theorist and national security expert
- Samuel Merrill III – voting behavior and party competition
- George Michael – specialist in right-wing extremism
- David Miller – political philosopher, specialized in theories of social justice
- Charles Mills – political philosopher specialising in race relations; author of The Racial Contract
- Sara McLaughlin Mitchell – American political scientist and the F. Wendell Miller Professor of Political Science at University of Iowa
- Terry M. Moe – specialist in American politics
- Marzuki Mohamad – former chief of staff to the prime minister of Malaysia, associate professor at the International Islamic University of Malaysia, specialist in ethnic politics
- Malcolm Moos – former president of the University of Minnesota
- Andrew Moravcsik – professor at Princeton University, liberal IR theorist, specialist on European Union politics
- Hans Morgenthau – realist, international relations specialist
- James D. Morrow – international relations expert and game theorist
- Rebecca Morton – expert in American politics, political economy, and experimental methods; professor at New York University
- Gerardo L. Munck – comparative politics specialist, expert on democratization and Latin America
- Michael Munger – trained as an economist, chair of political science at Duke University, running for governor of North Carolina as a Libertarian
- Naomi Murakawa – American political scientist and associate professor of African-American studies at Princeton University
- Amanda Murdie – Georgia Athletic Association Professor of International Affairs, University of Georgia; expert in the behavior of international nongovernmental organisations and their interactions with states, local populations, and intergovernmental organizations
- Clark A. Murdock – senior adviser, Center for Strategic and International Studies
- Diana Mutz – Samuel A. Stouffer Professor of Political Science and Communication at the University of Pennsylvania; director of the Institute for the Study of Citizens and Politics
- Harris Mylonas – associate professor of Political Science and International Affairs at George Washington University; editor-in-chief of Nationalities Papers

== N ==
- Brigitte L. Nacos – professor in political science at Columbia University
- Arthur Naftalin – specialist in American politics and former mayor of Minneapolis, Minnesota
- Amrita Narlikar – president of the German Institute of Global and Area Studies and former director of the University of Cambridge Centre for Rising Powers
- Antonio Negri
- Franz Leopold Neumann – known for analysis of National Socialism
- Kalypso Nicolaïdis – professor of International Relations and director of the Center for International Studies at Oxford University
- David Nolan – founder of the United States Libertarian Party
- Farish A. Noor – Malaysian historian and political scientist
- Pippa Norris – Harvard comparative political scientist
- Douglass North – Nobel laureate
- Philip Norton – British politics expert
- Julie Novkov – American political scientist at SUNY Albany studying the history of American law, American political development, and subordinated identities
- Joseph Nye – "soft power" international security specialist; Kennedy School dean

== O ==
- Karen O'Conner – political science professor at American University in Washington, D.C.; founder and director emerita of the Women & Politics Institute
- Guillermo O'Donnell – democracy specialist
- Aloysius-Michaels Nnabugwu Okolie – professor at the University of Nigeria, Nsukka
- Brendan O'Leary – ethnic conflict specialist
- Cornelius O'Leary – Irish historian and political scientist
- Bertell Ollman – political theorist
- Mancur Olson – international political economy specialist; expert on collective action problems; taught at the University of Maryland, College Park
- A.F.K. Organski – developed power transition theory in his 1958 book World Politics
- Norman Ornstein – American political theorist; American Enterprise Institute (AEI) resident scholar
- Elinor Ostrom – specialist on common pool resources; winner of the 2009 Nobel Prize for Economics
- Isaac Owusu-Mensah – Ghanaian political scientist

== P ==
- Thomas Pangle – political theorist at University of Texas at Austin
- Michael Parenti – political scientist and author
- Vilfredo Pareto
- W. Robert Parks – former president of Iowa State University
- Gianfranco Pasquino – Italian political scientist; electoral systems, comparative politics
- Tiago C. Peixoto – Brazilian political scientist in e-democracy and participatory democracy
- Armand Peschard-Sverdrup – U.S.-Mexico binational relations expert
- Dianne Pinderhughes – scholar of race and gender inequality & public policy, former American Political Science Association president
- Sergei M. Plekhanov – Russia relations expert
- Nelson W. Polsby – American politics scholar
- Samuel L. Popkin – early expert on rational choice theory
- Karl Popper – theorist, originated the open society theory
- Emilia Justyna Powell – Polish-American political scientist known for her expertise on international dispute resolution, the Islamic legal tradition, Islamic international law, and Islamic constitutionalism
- Jewel Prestage – first African-American woman to earn a Ph.D. in political science, former dean of the School of Public Policy and Urban Affairs at Southern University
- Adam Przeworski – Democratic transitions theorist, author of Democracy and Development; member of the September Group
- Robert D. Putnam – social capital theorist, author of Bowling Alone

== R ==
- Douglas W. Rae – equality theorist
- Vicky Randall – scholar of political science and gender
- Mahesh Rangarajan – Indian political analyst and researcher with a focus on contemporary Indian politics and the politics of wildlife conservation in India
- Arius Raposas - Filipino political science, international relations, and public administration scholar
- John Rawls – political philosopher
- Gary D. Rawnsley FRSA – British political scientist whose research is located at the intersection of international relations and international communication.
- Dan Reiter – political scientist, specialized on military conflicts and war; professor at Emory University; author of How Wars End
- R. A. W. Rhodes – public administration scholar, pioneer of the study of policy networks in British government
- Condoleezza Rice – former National Security advisor; former secretary of state; professor at Stanford University
- Floyd M. Riddick – Parliamentarian of the United States Senate 1964–1974, and developer of Riddick's Senate procedure
- William H. Riker – 20th-century political scientist who applied game theory to political science
- Patrick T. Riley – political theorist and Kant scholar
- Adam Roberts – Emeritus Professor of International Relations at the University of Oxford
- Pearl T. Robinson – American professor of political science at Tufts University
- David W. Rohde – Congress scholar
- Stein Rokkan – expert on political parties and movements, founder of the Institute for Comparative Politics
- Richard Rose – American political scientist, professor of Politics at the University of Aberdeen
- Richard Rosecrance – international relations and political economy expert
- Clinton Rossiter – American government and constitutional history theorist
- Irene S. Rubin – emerita at Northern Illinois University focusing on interview methodology and public budgeting in American government
- Susanne Hoeber Rudolph – scholar of political economy and political economy, former American Political Science Association president
- John Ruggie – international relations theorist, social constructivist

== S ==
- Larry Sabato – University of Virginia professor, director of the University of Virginia Center for Politics, and popular political analyst
- Scott Sagan – Stanford professor and notable critic of deterrence theory
- Slobodan Samardžić – research includes political ideas and institutions, federalism, constitutionalism, and European Union
- David Samuels – comparativist scholar of Brazilian politics and political institutions
- Eliz Sanasarian – professor of political science at the University of Southern California
- Emanuele Santi – Italian development economist, political scientist and author
- Virginia Sapiro – American political psychologist
- Austin Sarat – public law specialist
- Giovanni Sartori – comparativist, expert on constitutional theory and party systems
- E.E. Schattschneider – early political parties expert, author of Party Government and The Semisovereign People: A Realist's View of Democracy in America
- Steven Schier – specialist in American politics
- Warner R. Schilling – specialist in international relations and military technology
- Kay Lehman Schlozman – J. Joseph Moakley Professor of political science at Boston College; expert in American political participation and gender and politics
- Vivien A. Schmidt – Jean Monnet Chair of European Integration Professor of International Relations in the Pardee School of Global Studies and professor of political science at Boston University
- Carsten Q. Schneider – German professor of political science at Central European University; author of books and journal articles on applied methods of social science research
- Cheryl Schonhardt-Bailey – professor in Political Science at the London School of Economics and Political Science
- Victoria Schuck – professor of Political Science who spent much of her career (1940–1976) at Mount Holyoke College
- Ekaterina Schulmann – associate professor of the Russian Presidential Academy of National Economy and Public Administration and legal specialist
- Gesine Schwan – political scientist, president of the Viadrina European University, and nominated twice as a candidate for the federal presidential elections of Germany
- James C. Scott – political economist, Southeast Asia area specialist
- Mitchell A. Seligson – Centennial Professor of Political Science Vanderbilt University; founder of Latin American Public Opinion Project and AmericasBarometer
- Donna Shalala – former U.S. secretary of Health and Human Services
- Mizanur Rahman Shelley – minister of the Government of Bangladesh, political analyst, political scientist and educationalist
- Matthew Soberg Shugart – scholar of constitutional design and electoral systems
- Yekaterina Shulman – scholar specializing in lawmaking
- Jim Sidanius – American political scientist
- Beth Simmons – international relations scholar focusing on human rights
- Herbert A. Simon – Nobel Prize-winning professor at Carnegie Mellon; a founder of artificial intelligence research; received his Ph.D. in political science from the University of Chicago
- Valeria Sinclair-Chapman – studies American political institutions, the representation of minority groups in the United States Congress, and minority political participation
- Theda Skocpol – comparative sociologist; former president of American Political Science Association, Harvard University
- Stephen Skowronek – presidency and American political development scholar (Yale University)
- Anne-Marie Slaughter – scholar of international relations, former president of the American Society of International Law
- Jean Edward Smith – political economist, biographer, international relations, constitutional law
- Rogers Smith – Pulitzer Prize finalist, American politics expert at the University of Pennsylvania
- Steven S. Smith – American politics, congressional politics, Russian politics; director, Weidenbaum Center
- Maire-Claude Smouts – French political scientist
- Peverill Squire – Americanist
- Allison Stanger – American political scientist and the Russell J. Leng '60 Professor of International Politics and Economics at Middlebury College
- Michael Steed – British political scientist, developed the concept of "Steed swing" as distinct from "Butler swing"
- Alfred Stepan – comparativist, Wallace S. Sayre Professor of Government at Columbia University
- Zeev Sternhell – theorist, political historian of political ideology
- John G. Stoessinger – international relations theorist, author of The Might of Nations: World Politics in our Time
- Donald E. Stokes – former dean of the Woodrow Wilson School at Princeton; expert on elections
- Susan Stokes – Tiffany and Margaret Blake Distinguished Service Professor in the Political Science department of the University of Chicago and the faculty director of the Chicago Center on Democracy
- Herbert Storing – American politics expert
- Susan Strange – British expert in international relations; taught at the London School of Economics
- Dara Strolovitch – studies the politics of race, class, gender, and sexuality in the context of intersectional societal inequality
- Abdullahi Aliyu Sumaila – Nigerian political scientist, author of The Rise and Fall of Kano Peoples Party, secretary-general of People's Redemption Party 1980–1983, campaign manager of Nigerian People's Party –1983
- Carol Swain – professor of Law and Political Science at Vanderbilt University; expert on immigration and race
- Stephen Szabo – American political scientist and educator who specializes in foreign policy

== T ==
- Rein Taagepera – comparativist, expert on electoral systems and history of government
- Colin Talbot – chair of Government at the University of Manchester; adviser to various parliamentary committees of the United Kingdom
- Marco Tarchi – professor at University of Florence, right-wing militant and creator of Nouvelle Droite
- Katherine Tate – professor of Political Science at Brown University
- Merze Tate – international relations expert; first African-American woman to attend University of Oxford and receive a Ph.D. in government from Harvard University
- Anthony Teasdale – specialist in European Union politics
- Sally Terry – political science professor at Tufts University from 1975 until her retirement in 2002
- Jeanne Theoharis – Distinguished Professor of Political Science at Brooklyn College
- Dennis Thompson – political theorist at Harvard University
- Marianne Thyrring
- J. Ann Tickner – feminist international relations theorist and current president of the International Studies Association (ISA)
- Virginia Tilley – specialist on the Israeli–Palestinian conflict
- Charles Tilly – professor at Columbia University, his work includes contentious politics and evolution of modern states
- Herbert Tingsten – professor of political science at Stockholm University
- Reeta Chowdhari Tremblay – Canadian political scientist, former senior academic administrator, expert on Kashmir and India-Pakistan
- George Tsebelis – game theorist notable for his general theory of veto players and for describing the Robinson Crusoe fallacy
- Jeffrey K. Tulis – professor at The University of Texas at Austin

== U ==
- Patrick Utomi – political economist

== V ==
- Stephen Van Evera – MIT international relations expert, known for proposing the offense-defense theory
- Tatu Vanhanen – democratization and ethnic nepotism
- Sarojini Varadappan – Indian social worker who earned her PhD at the age of 80
- Sidney Verba – American political scientist, librarian and library administrator
- Mieke Verloo – professor of comparative politics and inequality issues at Radboud University
- Eric Voegelin – in his major work, Order and History in five volumes, he rejected the notion that political science should become a positivistic social science
- Margaret Vogt – Nigerian diplomat and political scientist who served as special representative and head of the United Nations Integrated Peace-building Office in the Central African Republic
- Leah Vosko – professor at York University

== W ==
- Helen Wallace – international relations specialist
- Denise Walsh – studies the relationship between women's rights and political inclusion and level of democracy
- Stephen Walt – international relations specialist
- Kenneth N. Waltz – founder of the neorealist international relations school
- Michael Walzer – international relations, just war theory
- John Wanna – Sir John Bunting Chair of Public Administration at the Australia and New Zealand School of Government
- Georgina Waylen – comparative politics, political economy, and gender
- Linda Weiss – professor of political science at the University of Sydney
- Patricia A. Weitsman – international relations scholar, alliance theory
- S. Laurel Weldon – Canadian and American political scientist and Distinguished Professor of Political Science at Simon Fraser University
- Alexander Wendt – social constructivism proponent
- Martin Westlake – specialist in European Union politics
- John Henry Whyte – specialist in Northern Irish politics
- Aaron Wildavsky – author of Risk and Culture
- Bruce A. Williams – specialist in American politics
- Danny Williams – premier of Newfoundland and Labrador
- James Q. Wilson – former president of the American Political Science Association
- Woodrow Wilson – former professor of Politics at Princeton University and former US president
- William Wohlforth – international relations scholar
- Arnold Wolfers – international relations scholar, classical realism
- Elisabeth Jean Wood – studies sexual violence during war, the emergence of political insurgencies and individuals' participation in them, and democratization
- Ngaire Woods – founding dean of the Blavatnik School of Government
- Susan L. Woodward – professor at the Graduate Center of the City University of New York

== Y ==
- Atilla Yayla – professor of Politics, Political Economy and Political Philosophy at Gazi University in Turkey; president of the Association for Liberal Thinking
- Yelyzaveta Yasko – Ukrainian political scientist and politician; member of the Ukrainian Parliament
- M. Crawford Young – comparativist, Africa scholar

== Z ==
- Fareed Zakaria – international relations expert
- John Zaller – author of The Nature and Origins of Mass Opinion; at UCLA
- Elizabeth Zechmeister – comparativist at Vanderbilt University, Latin American politics and public opinion expert, director of the Latin American Public Opinion Project
- Zhang Weiwei – Chinese political scientist
- Ina Zhupa – Albanian political scientist who studies democratization and values of Albanian society

== See also ==
- Oxford Handbooks of Political Science
- Political science
- Political theorist
