= Seligson =

Seligson is a surname. Notable people with the surname include:

- Esther Seligson (1941–2010), Mexican writer, poet, translator and historian
- Gary Seligson (born 1960), American drummer and percussionist
- Julius Seligson (1909–1987), American tennis player
- Mitchell A. Seligson (born 1945), American political scientist and sociologist
- Paul Seligson, British-born English teacher
