= Elizabeth Zechmeister =

American political scientist

Elizabeth Jean Zechmeister (born 1972) is an American political scientist and Cornelius Vanderbilt Professor of Political Science at Vanderbilt University, noted for her research on comparative political behavior, public opinion, Latin American politics, and terrorism studies.

== Education ==
Zechmeister earned her BA from Loyola University Chicago in 1994, her M.A. in Latin American Studies from University of Chicago in 1996, and her Ph.D. from Duke University in 2003.

== Career ==
Zechmeister held her first position as an assistant professor at University of California, Davis, in 2003 before joining the faculty at Vanderbilt University in the Department of Political Science in 2008. She became Cornelius Vanderbilt Professor of Political Science in 2018. Zechmeister is director of the LAPOP Lab (formerly known as the Latin American Public Opinion Project). As Director, she oversees the AmericasBarometer, a comparative public opinion survey that covers 34 nations including all of North, Central, and South America and many Caribbean nations. The survey typically includes more than 40,000 interviews, and is the most expansive regional survey project in the Western Hemisphere. Zechmeister is also a co-founder of the South-east Latin American Behavior Consortium (SELAB).

Her research has been supported by the National Science Foundation, the United States Agency for International Development (USAID), the Open Society Foundations, the United Nations Development Programme (UNDP), and the Inter-American Development Bank, among others. In 2012, she received the Vanderbilt A&S Jeffrey Nordhaus Award for Excellence in Undergraduate Teaching and in 2015 she received the Vanderbilt Award for Excellence in Graduate Teaching.

Zechmeister is associate editor of the Journal of Experimental Political Science and an editorial board member of the following journals: Comparative Political Studies, The Journal of Politics, and Political Behavior.

== Research ==
Much of Zechmeister's research focuses on voting behavior in Latin America, the emergence of political parties, and the volatility of party systems in the region. On these topics, she co-authored (with Herbert Kitschelt, Kirk Hawkins, Juan Pablo Luna, and Guillermo Rosas) the book Latin American Party Systems (Cambridge University Press, 2010). With Ryan Carlin and Matthew Singer, she also co-edited The Latin American Voter: Pursuing Representation and Accountability in Challenging Contexts (University of Michigan Press, 2015), which examines similar themes of political behavior and electoral volatility in Latin America.

Zechmeister's early work questions how voters in new Latin American democracies understood ideological labels, for example in her dissertation “Sheep or Shepherds? Voter Behavior in New Democratic Contexts”. She finds that meanings of "left” and “right” over the initial years of Mexican democracy contained references to valence issues and political actors that varied by individuals’ partisanships and political sophistication. “Left” labels grew ever more associated with the Partido de la Revolución Democrática and its interventionist social welfare message, while “right” labels tended to be defined by the Partido Acción Nacional (PAN) and its neoliberal and socially conservative message. In related work, she demonstrates that the Partido Revoluncionario Institucional’s (PRI) decades-long hegemony made location for other parties in the left-right ideological space challenging. A second study in this vein "What's Left and Who's Right?" compared the usage of ideological labels in Mexico and Argentina. This study largely confirmed her previous findings from Mexico in the Argentine case, and making the point that left-right label meanings vary by context depending on how elites discourse colors such labels. Subsequent solo scholarship (e.g., the chapter "Left-Right Identifications and the Latin American Voter" in The Latin American Voter) and co-authored work with Margarita Corral developed these themes more deeply with the use of region-wide survey data. The most novel methodological contribution across many of these works is that they employ Q methodology, an inductive approach to the study of human subjectivity developed in cognitive psychology, her work being one of the few applications of Q methodology in Political Science.

In recent years, Zechmeister has examined public opinion in the wake of natural disasters. Building off surveys conducted following the Chilean and Haitian earthquakes in 2010, Zechmeister explores in a set of papers the effect material damage and loss has on democratic attitudes and interpersonal trust. In a paper coauthored with Ryan Carlin and Gregory Love, she shows disaster victims in Chile often become less tolerant and supportive of democracy while also becoming more civically engaged. In a second paper with Carlin and Love, Zechmeister finds that, contrary to much of the existing scholarship, disaster loss can reduce social capital, but only in low state-capacity environments.

Zechmeister has also contributed to terrorism studies. In her book Democracy at Risk: How Terrorist Threats Affect the Public (University of Chicago Press, 2009), co-authored with Jennifer Merolla, she examines how threats of terrorism affect public opinion. Using survey data from the United States and Mexico, Zechmeister and Merolla argue that terrorist threat leads to increased citizen support for domestic political leaders, making them appear more charismatic than they otherwise would, and leads to increased public support for restrictive domestic laws.
