= Florida Central Voter File =

The Florida Central Voter File was an internal list of legally eligible voters used by the US Florida Department of State Division of Elections to monitor the official voter lists maintained by the 67 county governments in the State of Florida between 1998 and January 1, 2006. The exclusion of eligible voters from the file was a central part of the controversy surrounding the US presidential elections in 2000, which hinged on results in Florida. The 'Florida Central Voter File' was replaced by the Florida Voter Registration System on January 1, 2006, when a new federal law, the Help America Vote Act, came into effect.

== Private involvement ==
At the time, Florida was the only state that paid a private company to purge the voter file of ineligible voters, in effect allowing a private company to make the administrative decision of who is not eligible to vote. The State of Florida's Division of Elections was required to contract with a private entity to purge its voter file by chapter 98.0975 of the Florida statutes, which had been enacted by the Florida legislature to address voter registration fraud found during the 1997 Miami mayoral election.

Previously, voter purging had been conducted (sometimes controversially) by local elections officials. During the Civil Rights Movement, local election officials in southern states including Florida were the subjects of lawsuits, marches and civil disobedience as African-Americans attempted to register to vote. This led to the passage of the federal Voting Rights Act of 1965, banning discriminatory practices that kept African-Americans off the voter rolls.

The first firm hired in 1998 to purge the voter rolls was Professional Service Inc., which charged $5,700 for the job. Later the same year, the state placed an open request for tenders to bid for the job. The contract was assigned to DBT Online, despite the fact that its bid had the highest price. The state gave the job to DBT for a first-year fee of US$2,317,800; total fees eventually reached US$4 million. The Florida Department of Elections terminated Professional Service Inc.'s contract in 1999. DBT Online was acquired by ChoicePoint in early 2000 (itself acquired in 2008 by RELX′s LexisNexis Risk Solutions).

== Problems in the cleansing process ==
At first, Florida specified only exact matches on names, birthdates and genders to identify voters as felons. However, state records reveal a memo dated March 1999 from Emmett "Bucky" Mitchell, a lawyer for the state elections office who was supervising the felon purge, asking DBT to loosen its criteria for acceptable matches. When DBT representatives warned Mitchell that this would yield a large proportion of false positives (mismatches), Mitchell's reply was that it would be up to each county elections supervisor to deal with the problem.

In a February 2001 phone conversation with the BBC's London studios, ChoicePoint vice-president James Lee said that the state "wanted there to be more names than were actually verified as being a convicted felon".

=== James Lee's testimony ===
On 17 April 2001, James Lee testified before the McKinney panel that the state had given DBT the directive to add to the purge list people who matched at least 90% of a last name. DBT objected, knowing that this would produce a huge number of false positives (non-felons). His testimony indicates the state then ordered DBT to shift to an even lower threshold of 80% match and also include name reversals (thus a person named Thomas Clarence could be taken to be the same as Clarence Thomas). Besides this, middle initials were skipped, Jr. and Sr. suffixes dropped, and some nicknames and aliases were added to puff up the list.

"DBT told state officials", testified Lee, "that the rules for creating the [purge] list would mean a significant number of people who were not deceased, not registered in more than one county, or not a felon, would be included on the list. DBT made suggestions to reduce the numbers of eligible voters included on the list". According to Lee, the state's response to the company's suggestion was "Forget about it".

"The people who worked on this (for DBT) are very adamant ... they told them what would happen", said Lee. "The state expected the county supervisors to be the fail-safe." Lee said his company will never again get involved in cleansing voting rolls. "We are not confident any of the methods used today can guarantee legal voters will not be wrongfully denied the right to vote", Lee told a group of Atlanta-area black lawmakers in March 2001.

=== Errors in the list ===
Florida has re-edited its felon list five times since 1998 to correct errors.

The first list DBT Online provided to the Division of Elections in April 2000 contained the names of 181,157 persons. Of these, approximately 65,776 were identified as felons.

In May 2000, DBT discovered that approximately 8,000 names were erroneously placed on the exclusion list, mostly former Texas prisoners who never had been convicted of more than a misdemeanor. Later that month, DBT provided a revised list to the Division of Elections (DOE) containing a total of 173,127 persons. Of those included on the "corrected list", 57,746 were identified as felons.

Examples:

- Thomas Cooper, Date of Birth September 5, 1973; crime, unknown; conviction date, January 30, 2007
- Johnny Jackson Jr., Date of Birth, 1970; crime, none, mistaken for John Fitzgerald Jackson who was still in his jail cell in Texas
- Wallace McDonald, Date of Birth, 1928; crime, fell asleep on a bus-stop bench in 1959
- Reverend Willie Dixon, convicted in the 1970s at the latest; note, received full executive clemency
- Randall J. Higginbotham, Date of Birth, August 28, 1960; crimes, none, mistaken for Sean David Higginbotham, born June 16, 1971
- Reverend Willy D. Whiting Jr., crime, a speeding ticket from 1990, confused with Willy J. Whiting who have birthdays 2 days apart

=== Demographics of the purge list ===
According to the Palm Beach Post (among other issues), though blacks accounted for 88% of those removed from the rolls, they made up only about 11% of Florida's voters.

Voter demographics authority David Bositis, a former senior research associate at the Joint Center for Political and Economic Studies in Washington, DC, reviewed The Nation's findings and concluded that the purge-and-block program was "a patently obvious technique to discriminate against black voters". He noted that, based on nationwide conviction rates, African-Americans would account for 46% of the felon group wrongly disfranchised.

== Pre-election cleansing ==
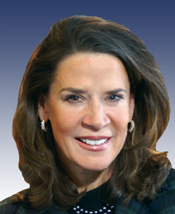
Florida Secretary of State Katherine Harris

At the time of the election, a purge list contained a number of false positives—people identified as felons who were not actually felons.

Skeptical of the list's accuracy, elections supervisors in 20 counties (including Palm Beach) ignored it altogether, thereby allowing thousands of felons to vote.

Statewide, a total of 19,398 voters were removed from the rolls. More than 18,600 of these removals matched a felon by name, birthdate, race and gender. More than 6,500 were convicted in counties other than where they voted, suggesting they would not have been found by local officials without the DBT list.

== Details about the errors ==
There were many specific problems with the purge list regarding the verification of felons, including over 4,000 blank conviction dates and over 325 conviction dates in the future.

DBT had decided in March 1999 not to include felon lists from South Carolina or Texas, which automatically restore voting rights, but that was overruled by the head of the Florida Office of Executive Clemency, Janet Keels, who ordered inclusion of any felon who did not have a written order of clemency, even from these states, wrongly placing 996 voters on the felon list. Florida did not restore their voting rights until three months after the election.

Additionally, a number of persons listed as felons had been convicted of misdemeanors only, and therefore were eligible by law.

Greg Palast, who has investigated this issue and identified occurrences of these problems, provides a sample of 23 names as they appear on the Florida 2000 felons list, with five examples of these erroneous listings highlighted (this represents a minimum rate of inaccuracy of 22% in this sample). Thomas Cooper, the second one in the list, was listed as being convicted on January 30, 2007.

=== Analysis ===
Database experts consulted by Greg Palast (including DBT's vice-president) told him that, to obtain 85% accuracy or better, one needs at least the following three things:

- Social Security numbers;
- Address history;
- A check against other databases.

ChoicePoint, in contrast, used virtually no Social Security numbers, did not check address histories, and used no database cross-checking, although it had 1,200 databases that could be employed for the task.

Because some of the source databases used did not list race, the matching criteria did not require a match with the voter's race for inclusion in the felon list. However, the decision was also made to enlarge upon this decision, and rule as ineligible the voter in question even if there was an explicit disagreement between the races listed on the source database and the voter list. According to the Palm Beach Post, more than 1,300 registered voters were matched with felons although their races or sexes were different.

The Palm Beach Post reported that

[C]omputer analysis has found at least 1,100 eligible voters wrongly purged from the rolls before last year's election. ... At least 108 law-abiding people were purged from the voter rolls as suspected criminals, only to be cleared after the election. DBT's computers had matched these people with felons, though in dozens of cases they did not share the same name, birthdate, gender or race. One Naples man was told he couldn't vote because he was linked with a felon still serving time in a Moore Haven prison. Florida officials cut from the rolls 996 people convicted of crimes in other states, though they should have been allowed to vote. Before the election, state officials said felons could vote only if they had written clemency orders, although most other states automatically restore voting rights to felons when they complete their sentences. ... Records used to create the felon list were sometimes wrong. A state database of felons wrongly included dozens of people whose crimes were reduced to misdemeanors. Furthermore, clemency records were incomplete.

Additionally, there are other accuracy problems with the list. For example, Linda Howell, Madison County supervisor of elections, who is not a convicted felon and was never on the felon list provided by the Division of Elections or the Florida Department of Law Enforcement, erroneously received a form letter referencing a prior felony conviction from the Florida Department of Law Enforcement stating.

== Election law violations, allegations, lawsuits ==
The problems with the list, the process by which it was manufactured and deployed, and other issues related to the 2000 election controversy in Florida, triggered much criticism and allegations of fraud, which resulted in investigations, litigation, and reform measures.

Phyllis Hampton, general counsel of the Florida Election Commission, testified that her office could investigate the wrongful removal of a Floridian from the voter rolls if there was evidence of a willful violation.

On February 17, 2001, the American Civil Liberties Union of Florida, in collaboration with Florida Legal Services and the Florida Justice Institute, launched the Equal Voting Rights Project.

In June 2001, the U.S. Commission on Civil Rights released a report and statements arguing that Florida was, on numerous counts, in violation of the Voting Rights Act of 1965, recommending:

- On 1 count that "The U.S. Department of Justice should immediately initiate the litigation process against the governor, secretary of state, director of the Division of Elections, specific supervisors of elections, and other state and local officials responsible for the execution of election laws, practices, and procedures ..."
- On 1 count that "The U.S. Department of Justice should initiate the litigation process against the governor ..."
- On 1 count that "The U.S. Department of Justice should initiate the litigation process against the secretary of State ..."
- On 12 counts that "The U.S. Department of Justice and the Civil Rights Division in the Office of the Florida Attorney General should initiate the litigation process against state election officials ..."
- ... And so on, totaling 20 recommendations involving the phrase "should initiate the litigation process" or "should immediately initiate the litigation process"

(See also THE 2000 VOTE AND ELECTION REFORM)

In February 2002, the NAACP and four other groups filed suit against Harris (NAACP v. Harris), the county elections supervisor and a former state election chief. The lawsuit cites the state, several counties and the contractor over procedures for voter registration, voter lists and balloting. The suit charges that Black voters were disenfranchised during the 2000 presidential election, and argued that Florida was in violation of the Voting Rights Act of 1965 and the US Constitution's 14th Amendment. The parties reached a settlement wherein ChoicePoint will reprocess the voter file on the plaintiffs' terms and donate $75,000 to the NAACP.

In August 2002, the U.S. Commission on Civil Rights released a briefing summary regarding the progress of voting rights in Florida.

== See also ==
- Elections in Florida
