= Colin Talbot =

British political scientist

Colin Ronald Talbot (born 1952) is a British political scientist. He was until August 2017 a professor at the University of Manchester and held the Chair of Government in the School of Social Sciences. He is now Professor Emeritus at Manchester and a research associate at the University of Cambridge. He has also been an adviser to UK Parliamentary Committees on HM Treasury and on Public Administration.

== Life and career ==
Colin Talbot has had an unconventional career, leaving school at 16 and working in various jobs before enrolling for an economics and social sciences degree course at Manchester University at the age of 21. He did not obtain a degree, instead becoming involved in student politics at Manchester University at the time. He subsequently obtained an MSc from London South Bank University and a PhD from the London School of Economics and Political Science. His doctoral thesis, awarded in 1995, was on Developing strategic managers for UK public services---a competing values and competences approach.

Talbot held posts at British Telecom and in local government in London. In 1990 he joined London South Bank University as a senior lecturer. In 1995, he was appointed as Chair in Public Policy and Management at University of Glamorgan, followed by appointments at University of Nottingham and University of Manchester.

He is one of the founders of the Herbert Simon Institute, named after Herbert A. Simon.

Colin Talbot was the founding director of Policy@Manchester and in September 2013 he founded Manchester Policy Blogs at The University of Manchester.

His personal blog is called "Public Investigations" https://colinrtalbot.wordpress.com/ and he also edits the Cambridge Policy Lab blogsite https://cambridgepolicylab.org/

== Parliamentary advisor ==
Talbot has acted as advisor and consultant to public organisations in the UK and internationally. He has given evidence to parliamentary committees on performance and public spending issues for the Treasury, on Public Administration and Welsh Affairs committees in the House of Commons, the Constitution Committee in the House of Lords, the Finance Committees of the Scottish Parliament and Northern Ireland Assembly. He has been a Specialist Adviser to the Treasury and Public Administration Select Committees (HoC).

Colin Talbot is particularly critical of the power of HM Treasury, as a government department, in contrast to other departments including the Cabinet Office, or the Prime Minister's Office. He also criticises the lack of a legal or constitutional basis of UK government departments.

== Work ==
- Colin Talbot's most recent book is titled Whitehall Watching: - reflections on innovation, inertia and ineptitude in British government (2003-2008).
- 'Theories of Performance: organizational and service improvement in the public domain' published with Oxford University Press in 2010.
- The Paradoxical Primate (2004) ISBN 0-907845-85-1
- Agencies: how governments do things through semi-autonomous organizations (2004, with Pollitt, C; Caulfield, J & Smullen, A) ISBN 1-4039-3322-7
- Unbundled Government: A critical analysis of the global trend to agencies, quangos and contractualisation (2003, editor with Pollitt, C) ISBN 0-415-31448-8
- The Alternative Comprehensive Spending Review (2007, editor with Baker, M) ISBN 0-7190-7807-5

== Personal life ==
Talbot lives in Bedford, with his wife, Dr Carole Talbot, and son Alex. He is an amateur Go player, and was a practitioner of Aikido.

== See also ==
- List of political scientists
