= Keisha Lynne Ellis =

Bahamian political scientist

Keisha Lynne Ellis is a Bahamian political scientist, known for her political and creative writing.

== Early life ==
Ellis earned a master's degree in International Political Economy from the University of Kent, Brussels School of International Studies.

== Career ==
Ellis is a political science lecturer at the University of the Bahamas. She wrote The People's Constitution: A Layman's Interpretation of the Constitution of The Bahamas after realizing that many of her students did not understand the underlying issues in the Bahamian referendum, 2002 and Bahamian constitutional referendum, 2016. The book is being used in classrooms. She was named a member of the Bahamas National Reparations Committee in 2014. This committee is tasked with establishing the case for reparations to Caribbean nations from former European colonial states for Native genocide and the effects of the transatlantic slave trade.

Since 2020, she has served as executive director of Hands for Hunger, the largest food bank in The Bahamas. In 2023, along with a partner, she launched The Pelagic Group, an international development consultancy firm, specializing in program and project development, monitoring and evaluation, and research across a number of sectors, including food insecurity, public health, and economic development.

Ellis is also known for her creative writing. Her work was featured in Eighth National Exhibition (NE8) at the National Art Gallery of the Bahamas. She has been published in several online magazines and print collections. She is the Strategic Initiatives Manager at Hands for Hunger, an organization that redistributes food and reduces food waste.

== Published works ==
- Ellis, Keisha Lynne (2009). The Little Death. Nassau: Poinciana Paper Press.
- Boodoo-Fortune, Danielle; Ellis, Keisha Lynne; Farmer, Sonia; Laughlin, Nicholas; Nixon, Angelique V.; Smith, Dionne Benjamin; Smith, Obediah Michael (2012). Death, Debt & Divorce. Nassau: Poinciana Paper Press.
- Ellis, Keisha Lynne (2012). "The Serpent and I". WomanSpeak: A Journal of Literature and Art by Caribbean Women. 6: 75–89.
- Ellis, Keisha Lynne. "Nassau Burning". Adda.
- Ellis, Keisha Lynne. "The Little Death". Pank Magazine.
