= Mina Andreeva =

Bulgarian-German political scientist and lawyer

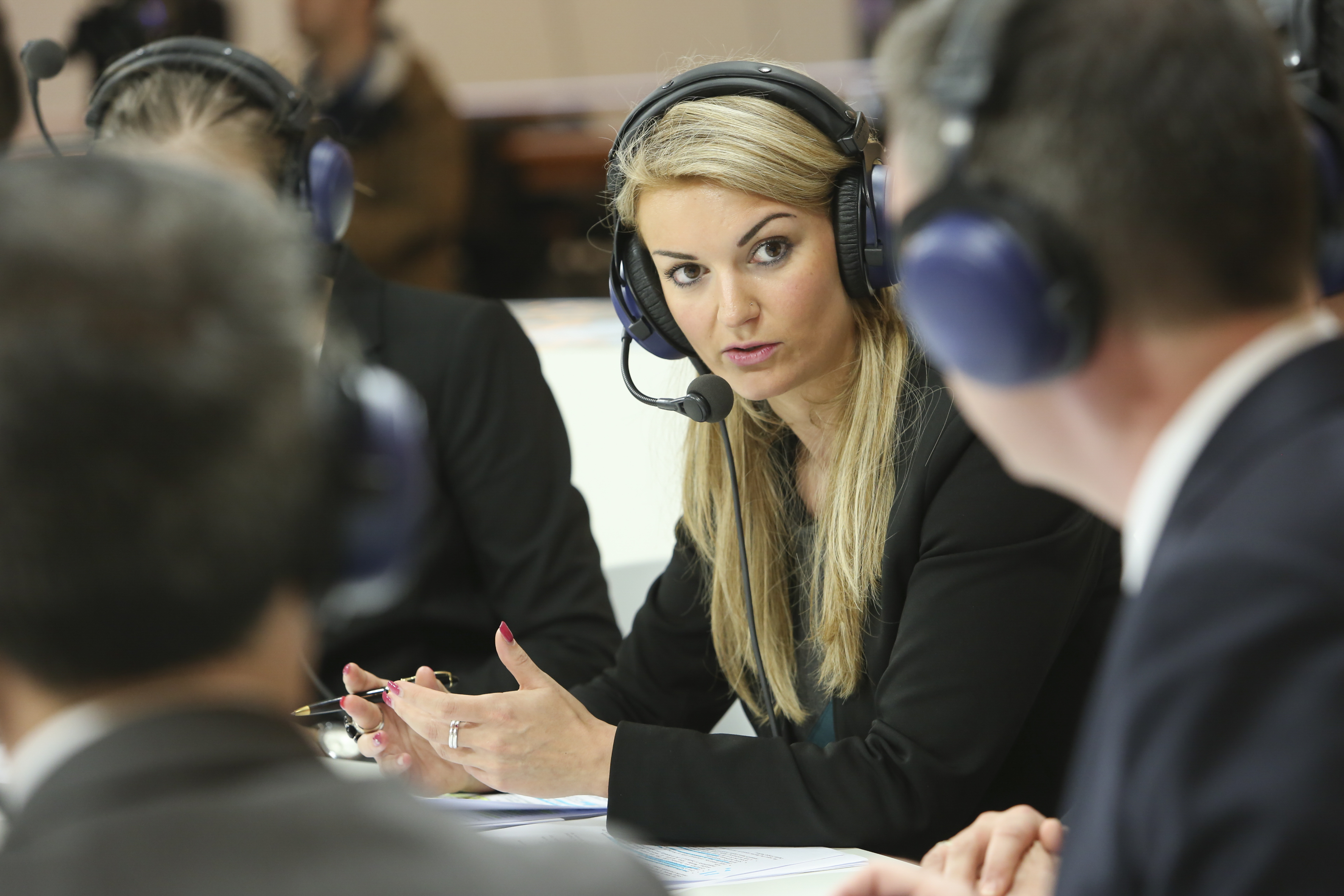
- Born: 1983 (age 42–43); Sofia, Bulgaria
- Occupations: political scientist, chief spokesperson for the European Commission

Mina Andreeva (born 1983 in Sofia, Bulgaria) is a Bulgarian-German political scientist and lawyer. She is the chief spokesperson for the European Commission.

== Life and career ==
Andreeva was born in Sofia, Bulgaria in 1983 to a German father and Bulgarian mother. At the age of eight, she moved with her family to Cologne, Germany, where her father worked as a journalist for state broadcaster Deutsche Welle. Andreeva grew up in Cologne. She studied European Studies at Maastricht University in the Netherlands, and then earned an LLM from the University of Edinburgh.

In 2007, she completed a five month internship at the European Commission's digital department. Andreeva then worked as a press officer for the Bulgarian commissioner. Five years later, she became the spokesperson for Luxembourgish politician Viviane Reding when she was European Commissioner for Justice, Consumers and Gender Equality. In 2014, Andreeva was promoted to the role of deputy spokesperson for the President of the European Commission, Jean-Claude Juncker. She became chief spokesperson in July 2019, replacing Greek politician Margaritis Schinas. In 2024, she joined the cabinet of European Parliament President Roberta Metsola to lead her strategic communications team.
