= Robert V. Bartlett =

American political scientist

Robert V. Bartlett is an American political scientist, currently the Gund Professor of the Liberal Arts at University of Vermont, previously the Fulbright Distinguished Chair at the Polytechnic University of Turin, the Frank Church Distinguished Professor at Boise State University, Senior Fulbright Scholar at Trinity College Dublin, and a Senior Fulbright Scholar at the Centre For Resource Management at Lincoln University and University of Canterbury, He was educated at Indiana University Bloomington.

Bartlett's books include:

- The Reserve Mining Controversy: Science, Technology, and Environmental Quality (Indiana University Press, 1980)
- International Organizations and Environmental Policy (with Priya A. Kurian and Madhu Malik, Greenwood Press, 1995)
- Deliberative Environmental Politics: Democracy and Ecological Rationality (with Walter F. Baber, MIT Press, 2005)
- Global Democracy and Sustainable Jurisprudence: Deliberative Environmental Law (with Walter F. Baber, MIT Press, 2009)
