= Paul Seligson =

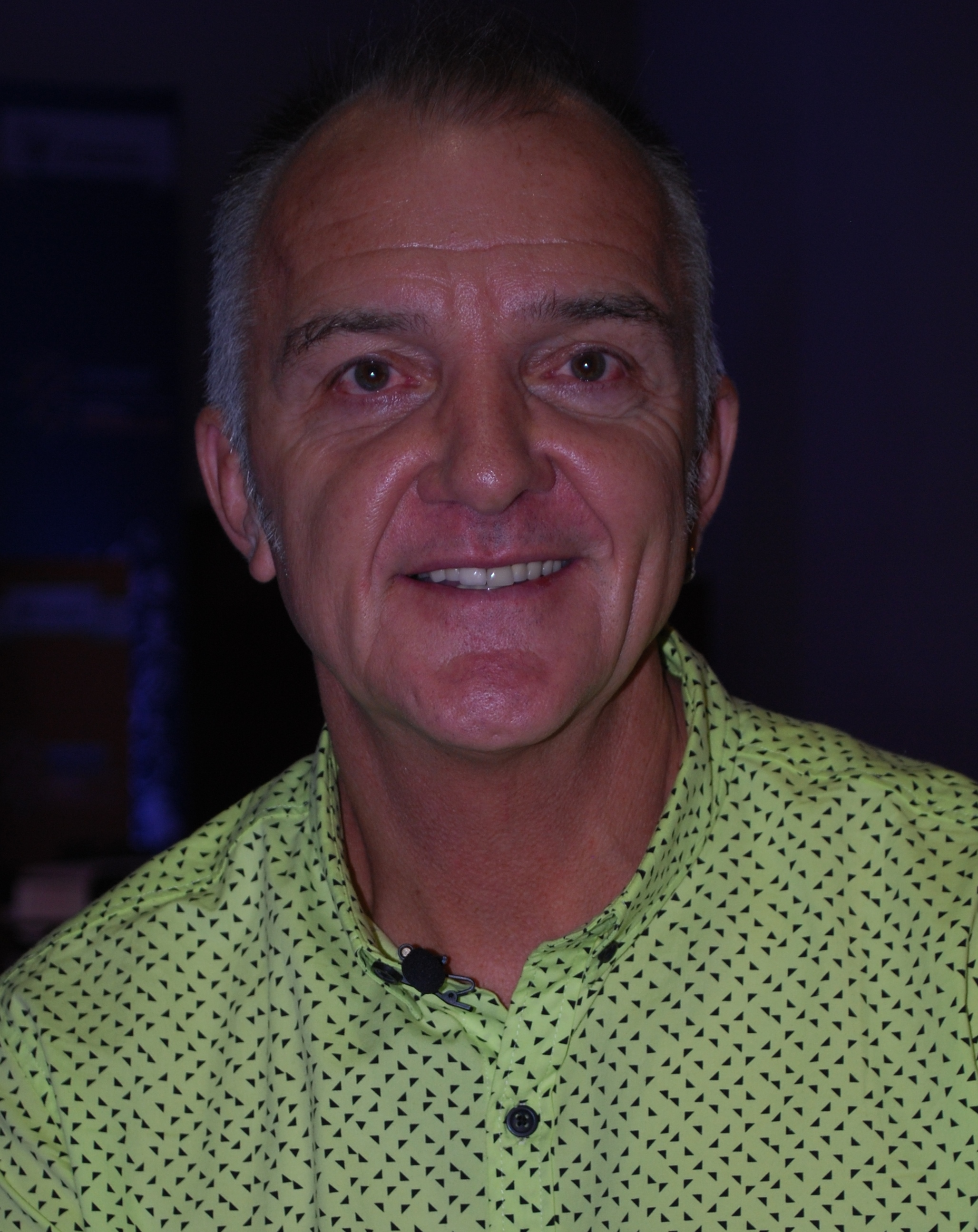
Paul Seligson at the Reunion Nacional de Grupos Colegiados CCM Grupo 6 at Tec de Monterrey, Mexico City Campus

Paul Seligson is a British-born English language teacher and writer on the teaching of English as a foreign language. He has been teaching English as a Foreign Language worldwide since 1978 and is well known for his lively, highly practical approach, materials, talks and teacher training. He now works freelance from his home in Brighton, and has evolved into a Latin America specialist.

== Education ==
Seligson received his master's degree in Teaching English as a Foreign Language and is qualified as a CELTA (Certificate in Teaching English to Speakers of Other Languages) assessor and London Chamber of Commerce & Industry (LCCI) examiner.

== Career ==
Seligson began his teaching career in 1978, with International House in Algeria. Next he worked for the British Council, in locations such as Egypt, Venezuela and Spain, working five year in Valencia as the assistant director of Studies. He has also taught in Brazil, Argentina, Turkey and Mexico.

He began writing in the United States, where he spent a year, then moved back to the United Kingdom, teaching English to immigrants and refugees. He also set up his own language school in Brighton.

His work as a teacher trainer has included COTE (Certificate for Overseas Teachers of English), DOTE, CELTA, DELTA, FTBE (First Certificate for Teachers of Business English), graduate and post-graduate courses on four continents, as well as a stint from 2000 to 2001 with the Oxford University Press.

Today he freelances as a writer, trainer and speaker at conferences, having given hundreds of sessions in English, Spanish, French and Portuguese and noted for his upbeat style and practical content. Seligson has also worked as a consultant in universities in Europe, North Africa, Asian and Latin America, along with observation programs in Spain, Turkey and Mexico. Seligson strongly believes we can best accelerate teen and adult foreign language learning by anticipating, embracing and building on and around their existing linguistic knowledge. Rather than teach through immersion, as if to children, or through a non-specific, ‘general English programme’ as if to learners in a multi-lingual class, we should be focussing on making creative, efficient use of what they already know.

Hence his new edition of Richmond's English ID series and its follow-on, IDentities 1 and 2, a 6-level teen and adult course, the first and still the only one written specifically for learners from a Romance language background.

== Publications ==
His over forty publications as author, co-author or consultant have targeted primary and secondary students along with adult learners of English. He has also written numerous articles in international magazines.

- "Identities 1 & 2" (Richmond, 2016–2017) Main author, Upper Intermediate & Advanced course in American English [Adults and teens], British English version (2017)
- "English iD" Second Edition; Starter, 1, 2 & 3 (Richmond, 2020) Main author, a four-level course in American English specifically for Spanish and Portuguese speakers in Latin America [Adults and teens]
- "English iD" (Richmond, 2013)
- Essential English 1-5 (Richmond, 2009)
- Awesome 1 to 3 (Richmond, 2008–9)
- American English File Elementary & Pre-Int. (OUP, 2007–8)
- Connexion 1 to 4 (Cultura Inglesa, Brazil, 2004–7) (series consultant)
- New English File Elementary & Pre-Int. (OUP, 2004–5)
- Power 1 & 2 (Richmond, 2004–5)
- Can Do 1 to 4 (Richmond, 2003–5)
- Interlink 1 to 6 (Cultura Inglesa, Brazil, 2002–4)
- Your Turn Next: Teacher’s Books 1 & 2 (Richmond, 1999)
- Prepositions (Zastrugi, 1998)
- Helping Students to Speak (Richmond Teacher's Handbook series, 1997)
- English File Levels 1 and 2 (Oxford University Press, 1996–7)
- Buzz 1-3 (BBC/Pearson, 1991–4) The first real multiple intelligence-based course for children which won the Duke of Edinburgh award Primary Book of the Year in 1992
- Mosaic 1-3 (Pearson, 1991–4)

Other publications · Articles in ETP, EFL Gazette, over 20 international journals & some training via youtube.com · Consultant on several books for Turkish universities including academic writing & a dictionary of ELT terminology
