= Alison Dagnes =

American political scientist

Alison D. Dagnes
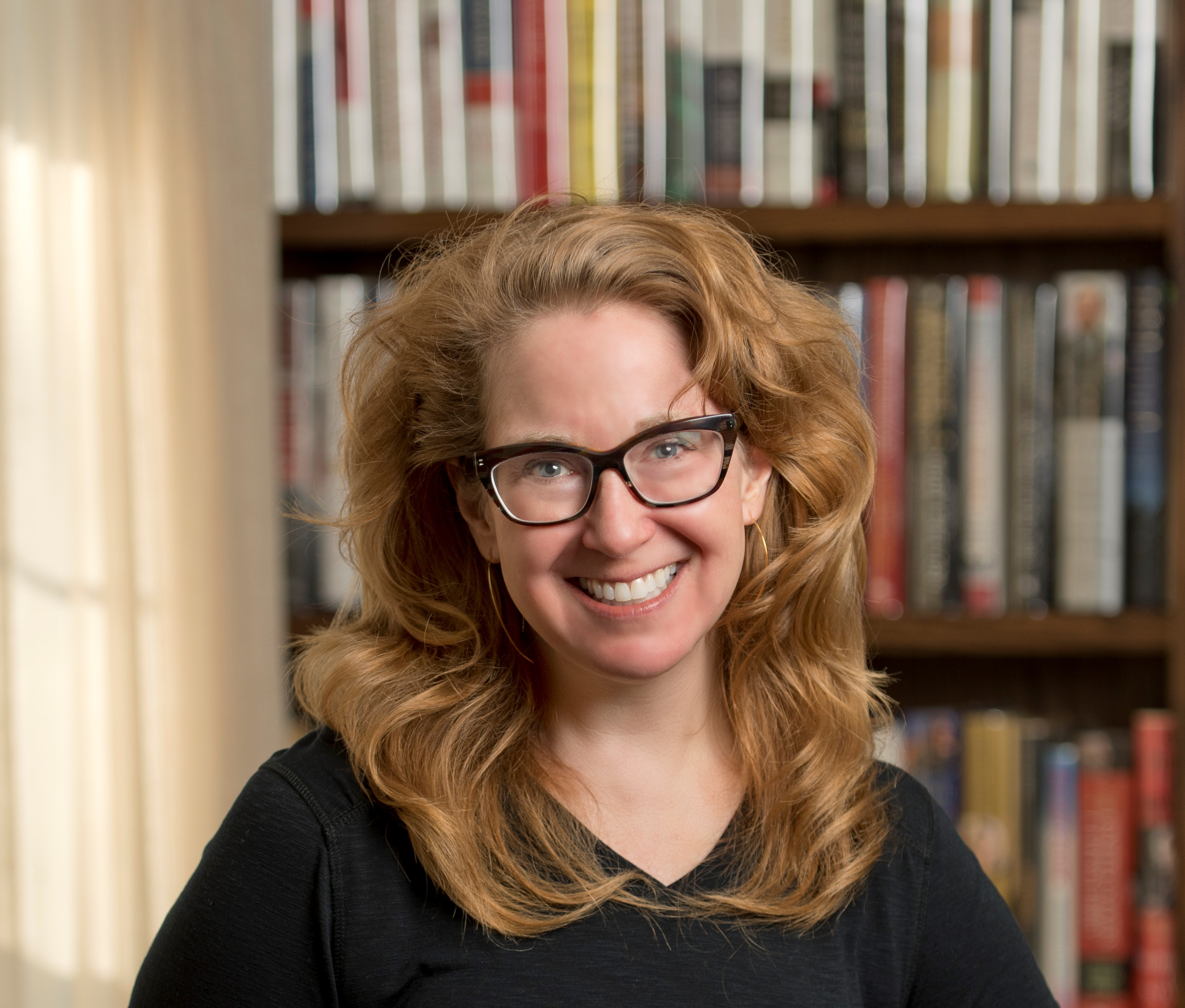
- Born: July 6, 1969 (age 57); Washington, DC, U.S.
- Occupations: Professor, National and International Media Commentator
- Website: ship.edu; alisondagnes.com

Alison Dawn Dagnes (born July 6, 1969) is an American professor, author, and commentator on American politics. Her work focuses on politics and the media, politics and humor, and political scandal. She is a Professor and Chair of Political Science at Shippensburg University of Pennsylvania.

== Education ==
Dagnes earned a Ph.D. in political science from the University of Massachusetts Amherst in 2003. Her dissertation focused on the use of media by right-wing extremist groups. She earned her BA in government from St. Lawrence University in 1991 and graduated from the Maret School in Washington, DC in 1987.

== Career and commentary ==
From 1991 to 1996, Dagnes was first a production assistant, then an associate producer, then a producer at C-SPAN in Washington, DC. She left Capitol Hill to attend graduate school when politics seemed tame. She was a lecturer at St. Lawrence University for two years and then joined the Political Science Department at Shippensburg University of Pennsylvania in 2003.

Dagnes is a Professor of Political Science and teaches courses on political behavior. Despite being a Democrat, Dagnes served as the faculty adviser for the College Republicans at Shippensburg for over a decade. Dagnes is also an ordained minister and has officiated the weddings of numerous former students.

Dagnes commentates in print, radio, and television for both American and international audiences. She offers analysis and commentary on US media and politics, political sex scandals, and politics and humor. Always up for new and challenging classroom projects, Dagnes had her upper-level Elections seminar create and launch Super PACs in 2014 in the aftermath of the Citizens United decision. While recovering from breast cancer surgery, she realized that federal law required the closure of these Super PACs after being notified by both bureaucratic threat and media inquiry.

Dagnes has been featured in The New York Times, Vanity Fair USA Today, National Geographic “Startalk” with Niel DeGrasse Tyson, The Atlantic Monthly, CNN, Netroots Nation, Wired, L.A. Times, New York Post, Washington Times, NPR, Smithsonian, C-SPAN, MSNBC “The Cycle”, Huffington Post, Real Clear Politics, Canadian Broadcast Corporation, Psychology Today, The Hill, Miami Herald, BBC, Al Jazeera, Triblive, UPI, Sirius/XM Radio “StandUp! With Pete Dominic,” Excelsior (Mexico), The Age (Australia), Kansas City Star, and the Atlantic Journal Constitution

== Books ==
Dagnes' book Super Mad at Everything All the Time was released in 2019. She has written or edited five books and contributed chapters to several other volumes. Her books include: A Conservative Walks Into a Bar: The Politics of Political Humor (Palgrave-Macmillan 2012); Politics on Demand: The Effects of 24 Hour News on American Politics (Praeger 2010); Sex Scandals in American Politics: A Multidisciplinary Approach (edited) (Continuum 2011) and Scandal! An Interdisciplinary Approach to the Consequences, Outcomes, and Significance of Political Scandals (Edited with Mark Sachleben) (Bloomsbury 2013).
