= Brigitte L. Nacos =

American political scientist (born 1936)

Brigitte Lebens Nacos (born 1936) is an adjunct professor in political science at Columbia University. She has written on the news media, the politics of Germany, and terrorism.

Nacos is a joint author of a paper, "Prevention of Terrorism in Post-9/11 America", which was delivered at the Summer 2006 meeting of the American Political Science Association. The paper studied the correlation between increases in terrorism alert levels and the popularity of then-U.S. President George W. Bush. Referring to the predictions in her study, journalist Matthew Stannard wrote in the San Francisco Chronicle, "The media will repeat the president's remarks. Public fear of terrorism will increase. And the president's poll numbers will rise."

== Education ==
Nacos holds a B.A., M.Phil., and Ph.D., all from Columbia University.

== Selected publications ==
- The Press. New York, Columbia University Press. 1990. ISBN 0-231-07064-0.
- Terrorism and the Media. New York, Columbia University Press, 1996, rev. 2nd ed. ISBN 0-231-10015-9.
- From Bonn to Berlin. Lewis J. Edinger and Brigitte L. Nacos. New York, Columbia University Press, 1998. ISBN 0-231-08412-9.
- Decisionmaking in a Glass House: Mass Media, Public Opinion, and American and European Foreign Policy in the 21st Century. Brigitte L. Nacos, and others, editors. London, Rowman & Littlefield Publishers, Inc. 2000. ISBN 0-8476-9827-0.
- Mass Mediated Terrorism: The Central Role of the Media in Terrorism and Counterterrorism. London: Rowman & Littlefield Publishers, Inc. 2002. ISBN 0-7425-1083-2.
- Terrorism and Counterterrorism: Understanding Threats and Responses in the Post-9/11 World. Penguin Academics Series. New York: Penguin, 2005. ISBN 0-321-16414-8.
- Fueling Our Fears: Stereotyping, Media Coverage, and Public Opinion of Muslim Americans. London: Rowman & Littlefield Publishers, Inc. 2006. ISBN 0-7425-3984-9.
- Nacos, Brigitte; Yaeli Bloch-Elkon; Robert Shapiro (2006). Prevention of Terrorism in Post-9/11 America: News Coverage, Public Perceptions, and the Politics of Homeland Security Policy. Conference Paper/Unpublished Manuscript. Archived from the original on September 23, 2009. Available in PDF.
- Nacos, Brigitte; Yaeli Bloch-Elkin; Robert Shapiro (2011). Selling Fear: Counterterrorism, the Media, and Public Opinion. Chicago: University of Chicago Press. ISBN 9780226567198.
- Nacos, Brigitte; Bloch-Elkon, Yaeli (2014). "News and Entertainment Media: Government's Big Helpers in the Selling of Counterterrorism". Perspectives on Terrorism. 8 (5): 18–31.

== See also ==
- German model
- Mass media and public opinion
- Media influence
- Politics of Germany
- Public opinion
- Theories of political behavior
