= Marianne Thyrring =

Danish political scientist

- Education: Aarhus University
- Organizations: Danish Meteorological Institute; Ministry of Environment of Denmark
- Awards: Order of the Dannebrog

Marianne Vendel Thyrring is a Danish policy maker and political scientist. She has been Director of the Danish Meteorological Institute and Department Head at the Ministry of Environment of Denmark.

== Life and career ==
Thyrring graduated from Aarhus University in 1982 with a Cand.scient.pol. degree. From 1984 to 1993, she worked in the Danish Ministry of Taxation. She then worked for a year as an attaché at the Representation of Denmark to the European Union.

In 1995, Thyrring became a Finance Manager at the Ministry of the Environment. From 1999 to 2003, she was Deputy Chief of Staff in the Cabinet of Environment Commissioner Ritt Bjerregaard. In 2003 she became head of the environmental policy area at the Danish Ministry of the Environment. Then from 2007 until 2012, she was Head of Department in the Ministry of the Environment.

In 2012, she left the Ministry of the Environment when she was appointed by the Ministry of the Interior of Denmark to conduct a study of the state of municipal-level democracy in Denmark. In 2013, she became Director of the Danish Meteorological Institute. At the Danish Meteorological Institute, she was involved in making the organization more public-facing, and making use of the large stores of weather-related data that it had.

Thyrring was awarded the Knight's Cross of the 1st degree of the Order of the Dannebrog in 2012.

== Selected awards ==
- Order of the Dannebrog (2012)
