= Roger D. Hansen =

American political scientist and professor

Roger D. Hansen (1935 – February 8, 1991) was an American political scientist and professor known for his work on economic development and north–south relations, focusing on the political challenges faced by developing countries and advocating for global responsibility in alleviating poverty.

== Biography ==
Roger D. Hansen was born in 1935 and became a distinguished political scientist, focusing on the political and economic challenges faced by developing nations. He spent 15 years as a professor of international relations at the Nitze School of Advanced International Studies (SAIS) at Johns Hopkins University in Washington, D.C. Hansen was recognized for his work on north–south relations and his advocacy for addressing global poverty through political solutions. His career reflected a deep commitment to understanding and improving the conditions of developing countries.

In 1973, Hansen was named a senior fellow at the Overseas Development Council, where he continued his research on economic development in the Global South. From 1977 to 1980, he was on leave from SAIS, serving as a senior staff member at the National Security Council and later as a senior research fellow at the Council on Foreign Relations in New York. His expertise in international relations also led him to teach at the Lyndon B. Johnson School of Public Affairs at the University of Texas in Austin from 1980 to 1981.

He authored several works, including The Politics of Mexican Development (1971), Beyond the North-South Stalemate (1979), and Central America: Regional Integration and Economic Development (1967). He also contributed to Rich and Poor Nations in the World Economy (1979) and published numerous articles in influential journals such as Foreign Affairs, World Politics, and International Organization.

Hansen was a member of the Cosmos Club and the Council on Foreign Relations, reflecting his standing in the field of international relations. Hansen suffered from a severe back condition that required multiple surgeries. This condition contributed to his death on February 8, 1991, when he took his own life at the age of 55.

== Bibliography ==
1. Hansen, Roger D. The Politics of Mexican Development*. Johns Hopkins Press, 1971.
2. Hansen, Roger D.Beyond the North-South Stalemate*. McGraw-Hill, 1979.
3. Hansen, Roger D.Central America: Regional Integration and Economic Development*. National Planning Association, 1967.
4. Contributions to "Rich and Poor Nations in the World Economy". McGraw-Hill, 1979.
5. Articles in Foreign Affairs, World Politics*, and *International Organization.
