= Gary Seligson =

American drummer

- Born: September 14, 1961 (age 64)
- Instruments: drums, percussion
- Website: garyseligson.com

Gary Seligson (born September 14, 1960) is an American drummer and percussionist from West Orange, New Jersey. A graduate of the University of Hartford Hartt School, he is a drummer based in New York City. Seligson has played in many Broadway hits including Tarzan, Aida and Wicked. He was also the drummer for Broadway show Billy Elliot's three-year run, performing at the Imperial Theatre. Seligson performed at the Lunt-Fontanne Theatre where he was the percussionist for the Broadway musical Motown. He has performed and/or recorded with various artists including: Elton John, Phil Collins, The Rascals, Idina Menzel and many more.

He is also endorsed by Pearl, Sabian, Pro-Mark and Remo.
