= Myriam Benraad =

French political scientist

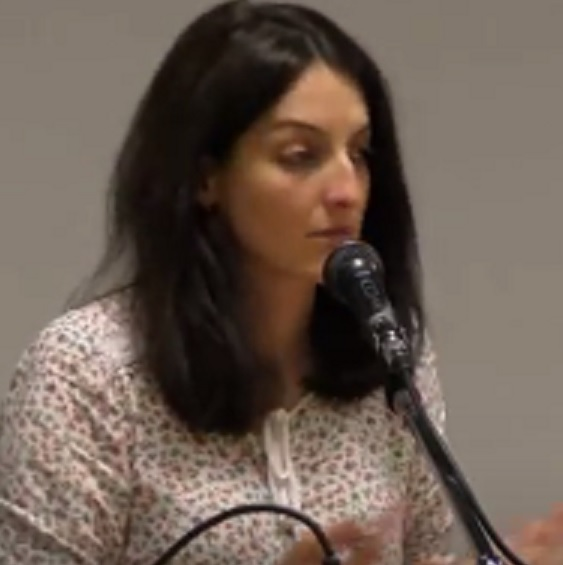
- Myriam Benraad at the conference "An unending chaos" organised by CML in Toulon on 1 February 2016
- Education: Institut d'études politiques
- Scientific career
- Fields: Political science; Arab studies
- Workplaces: Institut d'études politiques; Institut de recherches et d'études sur le monde arabe et musulman; Leiden University

Myriam Benraad is a French political scientist. She specializes in the politics of the Arab world.

== Career ==
Benraad graduated from the Institut d'études politiques in 2002. She then received her PhD in political science from the same institution in 2011.

Benraad was an early scholar of the Islamic State, chronicling its accumulation of power beginning in 2006 and its centrality in the evolution and reconfigurations of power that have occurred in Iraq since then. Her doctoral thesis, defended in January 2011, examined the sociopolitical group experiences of Sunni Iraqi Arabs in the context of the American occupation of Iraq.

In 2013, she became a researcher at the Institut de Recherches et d'études sur le Monde Arabe et Musulman (fr).

In 2015, Benraad was among the three finalists for the Brienne Prize for Geopolitical Writing, given by the association Lire la Société together with the French Ministry of Defense, as well as for the Worlds at War, Worlds at Peace Award from the Historical Book Fair at Verdun for her work Irak : la revanche de l'Histoire. De l'occupation étrangère à l'État islamique (Iraq: History's revenge. From foreign occupation to the Islamic State). This work was also the subject of numerous reviews in the popular media.

In 2017, she joined the faculty at Leiden University in Leiden, Netherlands. In 2019, she was a consultant to the French Ministry of Europe and Foreign Affairs and the French Ministry of Defense regarding the reconstruction of Iraq.

Benraad has been involved in professional service roles through the French Political Science Association (fr), the Middle East Studies Association, and the International Center for Counter-Terrorism.

Benraad has also worked on the topics of cyberbullying and cyberstalking, criticising governments for their lack of response to these issues as they grew in prominence, and describing the development of cyber-psychopaths as a new type of violence.

== Selected works ==
- "Les sunnites, l'Irak et l'État islamique", Esprit, 2014
- Irak, la revanche de l'histoire. De l'occupation étrangère à l'État islamique, 2015
- L'Irak par-delà toutes les guerres. Idées reçues sur un état en transition, 2018
