= Marie-Claude Smouts =

French political scientist (born 1941)

Marie-Claude Smouts (born 1941) is a French political scientist.

== Biography ==
Marie-Claude Smouts was born in France in 1941. She completed a doctoral thesis at the University of Paris in 1969, which was subsequently published in 1971 as Le Secrétaire général des Nations Unies: son rôle dans la solution des conflits internationaux (The Secretary-General of the United Nations: His Role in the Resolution of International Conflicts).

She pursued an academic career at the French National Centre for Scientific Research (CNRS), where she became a research director at the Centre for International Studies (CERI), a research centre associated with the National Foundation for Political Science (FNSP). She also taught international relations at the Paris Institute of Political Studies (Sciences Po), where she was teaching by 1989. In 2000, she received the CNRS Silver Medal for her contributions to political science and international relations research. By 2011, she held the status of honorary research director at the CNRS.

Her research initially focused on international organisations, particularly the United Nations, examining the complexity of the mechanisms through which governments regulate relations of power. Her early work explored the role of the UN Secretary-General in international conflict resolution and the political dynamics surrounding international organisations. She subsequently turned her attention to North–South relations, analysing the political and economic relationships between industrialised and developing countries.

With the emergence of environmental issues and sustainable development as increasingly important concerns in international politics, Smouts developed a broader theoretical interest in the establishment and governance of global commons. This research included an empirical investigation into international policies concerning the management of tropical forests, examining the relationship between environmental protection, economic interests and international cooperation. Her work also addressed the effects of economic liberalisation on natural resources and developing economies.

Smouts' approach to international relations combined field research, interdisciplinary analysis and theoretical development, drawing on disciplines including history, law and sociology. She argued for an understanding of international relations that incorporated the contributions of different academic disciplines rather than relying exclusively on political science. Her research and publications addressed multilateral diplomacy, French foreign policy and international relations theory.

In 1998, she edited Les nouvelles relations internationales: pratiques et théories (The New International Relations: Practices and Theories), a collective work examining developments in international relations following the end of the Cold War and the expansion of globalisation. Its subjects included nationalism, European integration, international political economy, conflict and transnational networks.

In 2000 she received the CNRS Silver Medal, and in the following year she published Forêts tropicales, jungle internationale: Les revers d'une écopolitique mondiale, examining the international politics of tropical forest management and the competing interests of governments, local populations and transnational organisations. In 2007, she co-edited La situation postcoloniale: Les postcolonial studies dans le débat français, a collection examining postcolonial studies and their relevance to the French intellectual and political debate.

She subsequently co-authored Les organisations internationales with Guillaume Devin, published in 2011, and contributed to the Dictionnaire des relations internationales, published in 2012. Her scholarly contributions also appeared in several academic journals, including Revue française de science politique, Politique étrangère, Politique africaine and Critique internationale.

== Publications ==
- Marie-Claude Smouts (ed.) (1998). Les nouvelles relations internationales [The New International Relations]. Références (in French). Presses de Sciences Po. p. 409. ISBN 978-2-7246-0755-0. ; ;
- Bertrand Badie; Marie-Claude Smouts (1999). Le retournement du monde [The Reversal of the World]. Amphithéâtre (in French). Paris: Presses de la Fondation Nationale des Sciences Politiques. p. 238. ISBN 2-247-03672-4. ;
- Marie-Claude Smouts (2001). Forêts tropicales, jungle internationale [Tropical Forests, International Jungle]. Références (in French). Presses de Sciences Po. p. 349. ISBN 978-2-7246-0852-6. ;
- Marie-Claude Smouts (ed.) (2007). La situation postcoloniale [The Postcolonial Situation]. Références (in French). Paris: Presses de Sciences Po. p. 456. ISBN 978-2-7246-1040-6. ; ;
- Guillaume Devin; Marie-Claude Smouts (2011). Les organisations internationales [International Organizations]. Science politique (in French). Armand Colin. p. 256.
- Dario Battistella; Franck Petiteville; Marie-Claude Smouts; Pascal Vennesson (2012). Dictionnaire des relations internationales [Dictionary of International Relations] (in French). Dalloz. p. 572.

== Awards and distinctions ==
- CNRS Silver Medal (2000).
