= Michael Krassa =

Michael Krassa is the chair of "Human dimensions of Environmental Systems" and a professor in political science at the University of Illinois at Urbana-Champaign. He specializes in the interactions between humans and their environments.

His early work was on how one's neighbourhood of residence influenced political views and participation. This work evolved into a larger interest in the way that the social and physical setting in which a person lives affects behaviors and attitudes. In this broader mode of inquiry, his work pushed the idea that behaviors depend on the social and physical context. His works on neighbourhoods in Illinois, California, Missouri, and modern planned places such as Poundbury (in the UK), Seaside, Florida (USA), Kentlands, Maryland (USA), and Celebration, Florida (USA) all demonstrate that the physical setting is an important determinant of the kinds of interpersonal connections a person forms, and interpersonal connections are a strong determinant of the way the people form political views.

His holistic work on suburban and urban life is not easily classified. He criticizes the New Urbanist planners for narrowness and incomplete planning, but recognizes the strong points such as planning for "community" and "civic engagement." He highlights both the strengths and weaknesses of such communities, commending the efforts at building "public spaces" and the "third place," but notes that, to date, most have failed to build either the racial or income diversity that was planned, and have not succeeded in creating the desired level of local employment within the community. However, he indicates that even the oldest of these are fairly new neighbourhoods, and that only time will tell.

He also notes the dangers of successful local communities. Warning about deviation, "groupthink," and self-reinforcing values, he notes that the successful New Urbanist enterprises may be in danger of building communities that embody the worst of the small town instead (or in addition to) its best. His work shows that this is avoidable in a number of ways, one of which is building cities that have a large number of diverse, successful neighbourhoods.

His research on sustainable suburban development goes far beyond the political, focusing on how even far-flung suburbs might become more self-sufficient even if a majority of residents must commute some distance to work. He posits that commuter trains and trolleys provide benefits similar to remote offices, and how suburbs with retail and employment that draw on local residents are more successful than those lacking in such features. One difficulty, he notes, is that those employed in suburban jobs often commute there from a different suburb, mitigating much of the hypothesised benefit of jobs in the suburb. He indicates that the solution to this is social and political rather than design based.

As a political scientist, his work shows that both the participation and voting patterns in suburban neighbourhoods vary markedly with the way that the neighbourhood is integrated with itself, and with the networking patterns of its residents. Neighbourhoods with dense internal social networks are stronger and more able to resist crime, development, pollution, and other "undesirable" features. Neighbourhoods where most residents have few internal connections are loosely organized and threats such as crime will quickly lead to "flight" or departures. The fight or flight response applies to resident decisions about whether to remain or leave a neighbourhood facing change, and Krassa shows that network density and location, as well as neighbourhood type, are important determinants of resident choice.

His most influential work is an Op-Ed, "The Bright Side of NIMBY," in which he argues that the "Not In My Back Yard" response by residents is a sign of a level of connections within a neighbourhood that in some ways demonstrates health. Although often NIMBY is seen as something bad, if the residents successfully organize to repel something they see as undesirable, it is a sign that there are interconnections within the neighbourhood that can produce desirable (as well as undesirable) consequences.

His other noteworthy finding is that the decline in voter turnout for local and state elections is most dramatic in areas that have the fewest interpersonal ties within the locale. As the proportion of a person's social network lay outside the locale in which one resides declines, the chance that one votes or otherwise participates in local affairs also declines. This is important because political scientists have noted the remarkable decline in voting at all levels but especially the local. Some political scientists have also noted the increasing "nationalization" of all elections—the idea that more and more the same issues are important everywhere. Krassa's findings may help explain this.

== Bibliography ==
- Krassa, Michael et al.,Understanding American Government. 2004.
