= Alice Kang =

American political scientist

Academic background
- Education: Brown University
- Alma mater: University of Wisconsin-Madison

Academic work
- Discipline: Political science
- Sub-discipline: Comparative politics
- Institutions: University of Nebraska–Lincoln
- Main interests: Women's activism Gender quotas Women's representation in politics
- Notable works: Bargaining for Women's Rights: Activism in an Aspiring Muslim Democracy

Alice J. Kang is Associate Professor of Political Science at University of Nebraska–Lincoln.

== Education ==
Kang received her B.A. in economics from Brown University in 2000 and her Ph.D. in political science from University of Wisconsin-Madison in 2010.

== Career ==
Kang holds a joint appointment with the University of Nebraska–Lincoln's Institute for Ethnic Studies (African and African American Studies), and is affiliated with the university’s Women's and Gender Studies Program.

Before becoming an academic, Kang was a Peace Corps volunteer in Burkina Faso from 2000 to 2002, specializing in community health. She also served as a consultant for the International Foundation for Election Systems and as an intern for AllAfrica.com, both in Washington, D.C.

== Research ==
Kang teaches and conducts research on comparative politics, with a regional focus on Africa and especially Niger. Her scholarly contributions are in the areas of women's activism, gender quotas, and women's representation in politics. Kang's research is multidisciplinary, merging qualitative and quantitative methods and borrowing approaches from sociology and anthropology. Her publications include the 2015 book Bargaining for Women's Rights: Activism in an Aspiring Muslim Democracy (ISBN 978-0-8166-9218-7), which is known for developing a theory of how conservative counter-activism, and not just progressive activism, influences why some women's movements succeed more than others. Her work is rooted in immersive field research, which Kang has conducted since 2006 in Niger, Benin, Burkina Faso, and South Africa. Her field work in Niger during 2007-2008 was funded by a Fulbright Hays Doctoral Dissertation Research Award.
