= Emanuele Santi =

Italian economist and political scientist

Emanuele Santi is an Italian development economist and political scientist, TedEx speaker book author. His books include Fear no more: Voices of the Tunisian Revolution a best selling and passionate coverage of the Tunisian Revolution.

He is the President and co-founder of Afrilanthropy a charity offering advice to social enterprises as well as philanthropic organizations and impact investors. He is also CEO of Development Finance Lab an impact investing advisory company with a focus on Africa

He was the fund manager of the Agri-Business Capital Fund, a fund spearheaded by IFAD and a number of organizations focused on supporting agri-business in developing countries. Prior to that, he worked for nearly two decades for multilateral development banks and (World Bank, African Development Bank) and IFAD advising governments on numerous public sector and governance reforms. His work experience spans over 15 developing countries mostly in Africa, Eastern Europe and Latin America. He authors various books and articles on development issues, particularly in the area of governance, regional integration and local development. These include Fear no more: Voices of the Tunisian Revolution a passionate coverage of the Tunisian Revolution which he experienced firsthand as a local resident, blogger and economist.

In 2012, Emanuele Santi founded Souk Attanmia, the largest and most innovative partnership in support to social entrepreneurship in Tunisia.Stanford SS Review case study.

In 2022 he launched Riding the Rainbow, a global app promoting circular economy and social integration of refugees.

== Publications ==
- Russo, F, Santi, E, Fear No More, Amazon, 2021, https://www.amazon.it/dp/B09NRD21FR
- Santi, E, Decentralization and Governance in Developing Countries: The case of Ghana Edit Lambert|May 22, 2012
- Santi, E et al. (Eds), Unlocking North Africa's Potential through Regional Integration, African Development Bank Tunis, Tunisia, 2012 Edit African Development Bank|April 1, 2012.
- Santi, E. et al., New Libya, New Neighbourhood: What Opportunities for Tunisia? North Africa Quarterly Analytical, N.1, African Development Bank, Tunis, Tunisia, 2012 Edit African development bank|January 15, 2012
- Santi E., La Rivoluzione Tunisina, Origini e Prospettive, Rivista di Studi Politici - S. Pio V, 2/2011 - Anno XXIII - Aprile/Giugno Edit Universita di San Pio V|April 1, 2011
- Santi, E, Ben Romdhane, S., Assessing the preliminary impacts of the Libya's crisis on the Tunisian economy Edit Topics in Middle Eastern and African Economies|September 1, 2011
- Negatu G, Santi E, Tench E “Improving governance and Public Financial Management through budget support: The experience of the African, Development Bank” ECDPM Discussion Paper 88B, Maastricht, 2010
- Santi, E, Santiso, C and Campos, I, “Assessing Governance, Staff Guidance Note on the Governance Rating of the Bank’s Country Performance Assessment”, African Development Bank, 2009 Edit African Development Bank|June 15, 2009
- Santi, E. Grenna, L. : “Environmental Communications Assessment: A framework of analysis for the environmental governance”, in Walker, G. and Kinsella, W. (2005) Finding our Way(s) in Environmental Communication Edit 2003 Authors: Emanuele Santi, Lucia Grenna
- Koutsouris, A., Santi E. and Tare A., "Building support for protected area: the case of the Butrint National Park", in Auchincloss, E. and Goldstein, W. (Eds.) Communicating Protected Areas. IUCN, Gland, Switzerland, 2004 Edit IUCN|2004
- Russo F., Santi E.: “La Banca Mondiale”. In Caviglia E (Ed) Le Istituzioni Finanziarie nel Nuovo Contesto Internazionale, Milano, 2003 Edit Led Editore|2003
- Russo F., Santi E.: South-east Asian Trade Off: Between Economic Development and Nuclear Armament: Which Way for a New International Role? Paper commissioned by the Military Centre of Strategic Studies (CEMISS), Rome, 2003 Edit Italian Ministry of Defence|2003 Authors: Emanuele Santi, Francesca Russo
- Santi, E.: “La Crisi Asiatica e gli Effetti sull’Economia Italiana”, Politeia, Vol. 64, Milano, 2001 Edit Politeia|2001 Authors: Emanuele Santi
- Santi, E.: “In Search of a Quantitative Approach for Political Criteria of EU Enlargement", Europa 2002, Vol. 3 33, Budapest, 2001 Edit Europa 2002|2001
