= American While Black: African Americans, Immigration, and the Limits of Citizenship =

2019 book by Niambi Carter

American While Black: African Americans, Immigration, and the Limits of Citizenship is a 2019 book by Niambi Carter, published by Oxford University Press.

The book received the 2020 W. E. B. Du Bois Distinguished Book Award from the National Conference of Black Political Scientists.
