= Donna Lee Bowen =

American political scientist

Donna Lee Bowen is an American political scientist who specializes in studies of family policy in the Middle East. She is a professor of political science at Brigham Young University (BYU) where she is also an affiliated faculty member of the Women's Studies Program.

Bowen holds a bachelor's degree in political science from the University of Utah and an MA and PhD in Near Eastern Languages and Civilizations from the University of Chicago.

Bowen edited Everyday Life in the Contemporary Middle East with Evelyn A. Early. She has an upcoming book entitled Family Planning, Islam and the State. Her most cited article is "Abortion, Islam and the 1994 Cairo Population Conference" published in the International Journal of Middle East Studies Vol. 29, issue 2, May 1997. She has written articles such as "What is the relationship of Inequity in Family Law and Violence Against Women" with Valerie M. Hudson that was published in 2011 in the journal Politics and Gender.

Bowen has also appeared on the television show "Insite with Jon Du Pre".

The American Institute for Maghrib Studies has a graduate student travel award named after Bowen. In 2020 the Columbia University Press published a book co-authored by Bowen entitled The First Political Order: How Sex Shapes Governance and National Security Worldwide. Along with Valerie M. Hudson, and Perpetua Lynne Nielsen.

== Sources ==
- BYU women's studies bio of Bowen

“We Are Not Helpless: Addressing Structural Gender Inequality in Post-Conflict Societies”

“State Fragility and Structural Gender Inequality in Family Law: An Empirical Investigation”

“Clan Governance and State Stability: The Relationship between Female Subordination and Political Order”

“What is the Relationship between Inequity in Family Law and Violence against Women? Approaching the Issue of Legal Enclaves”

“Globalization, mobile phones and forbidden romance in Morocco”

“Abortion, Islam and the 1994 Cairo Population Conference”

“Respect for Life: Abortion in Islam and The Church of Jesus Christ of Latter-day Saints”

“Changing contraceptive mores in Morocco: population data, trends, gossip and rumours”

"Congruent Spheres of Religious Authority: National and Local Levels of Charismatic Leadership"

“The Paradoxical Linkage of the ‘Ulama’ and Monarch in Morocco"

“Moroccan Women’s Integration of Family and Religion"

“Attitudes toward family and family planning in the pre-Saharan Maghreb”
