= David Bositis =

American political analyst

David A. Bositis
- Occupation: Senior Research Associate
- Known for: Minority Politics

David A. Bositis is an American expert on voting rights and redistricting. He is a former a senior research associate at the Joint Center for Political and Economic Studies in Washington, D.C.

Bositis is frequently consulted by major newspapers, including The New York Times and The Washington Post for his input on issues of race in politics.

Bositis received his bachelor's degree from Northwestern University, and a master's degree and doctorate from Southern Illinois University. Bositis joined the Joint Center in 1990, and designs and manages national surveys, mainly geared towards minorities.

Bositis is the author of at least six books and numerous articles which focus on minority politics, especially black representation and voting patterns and the effects of redistricting on minority representation.

== Publications ==
- Bositis, David (1990). Research Designs for Political Science. Carbondale: Southern Illinois University Press. ISBN 0-8093-1600-5.
- Bositis, David (1998). Redistricting and Minority Representation. Washington: Joint Center for Political and Economic Studies. ISBN 0-7618-1195-8.
- Bositis, David A.; Baer, Denise L. (1988). Elite cadres and party coalitions: representing the public in party politics. Westport, Conn: Greenwood Press. ISBN 0-313-26153-9.
- Bositis, David A.; Baer, Denise L. (1993). Politics and linkage in a democratic society. Englewood Cliffs, N.J: Prentice Hall. ISBN 0-13-682402-1.
- Bositis, David (1994). The Congressional Black Caucus in the 103rd Congress. Washington: Joint Center for Political and Economic Studies. ISBN 978-0-8191-9560-9.
