= Latin American Public Opinion Project =

LAPOP Lab
- Type: Research institute
- Purpose: Public opinion surveys in areas such as democratic values and political behavior
- Location: Nashville, Tennessee
- Website: www.vanderbilt.edu/lapop/

The LAPOP Lab (formerly known as the Latin American Public Opinion Project) is a research institute specializing in the development, implementation, and analysis of public opinion surveys. Founded by Mitchell A. Seligson, its principal focus is on governance and democracy in Latin America and the Caribbean. The AmericasBarometer measures democratic values and behaviors using voter surveys.

== History ==
LAPOP has its origins in studies of democratic values in Costa Rica. This pioneering public opinion research took place in the 1970s, a time in which much of the rest of Latin America was under the control of authoritarian regimes, prohibiting studies of public opinion.

== Structure ==
LAPOP is housed at Vanderbilt University in Nashville, Tennessee. A team of faculty, staff, post-doctoral researchers, graduate students, and undergraduate students designs and analyzes the public opinion surveys generated by the project. The group also edits and publishes the regular Insights Series reports, each one of which examines one facet of public opinion.

LAPOP functions as a consortium, working in partnership with numerous academic and non-governmental institutions in Latin America and the Caribbean.

== AmericasBarometer ==
In 2004, LAPOP established the AmericasBarometer.

Survey Round	Countries Included
2004	Bolivia, Colombia, Costa Rica, Dominican Republic, Ecuador, El Salvador, Guatemala, Honduras, Mexico, Nicaragua, Panama
2006	Bolivia, Brazil, Canada, Chile, Colombia, Costa Rica, Dominican Republic, Ecuador, El Salvador, Guatemala, Guyana, Haiti, Honduras, Jamaica, Mexico, Nicaragua, Panama, Paraguay, Peru, United States, Uruguay, Venezuela
2008	Argentina, Belize, Bolivia, Brazil, Canada, Chile, Colombia, Costa Rica, Dominican Republic, Ecuador, El Salvador, Guatemala, Guyana, Haiti, Honduras, Jamaica, Mexico, Nicaragua, Panama, Paraguay, Peru, United States, Uruguay, Venezuela
2010	Argentina, Belize, Bolivia, Brazil, Canada, Chile, Colombia, Costa Rica, Dominican Republic, Ecuador, El Salvador, Guatemala, Guyana, Haiti, Honduras, Jamaica, Mexico, Nicaragua, Panama, Paraguay, Peru, Suriname, Trinidad and Tobago, United States, Uruguay, Venezuela
2012	Argentina, Belize, Bolivia, Brazil, Canada, Chile, Colombia, Costa Rica, Dominican Republic, Ecuador, El Salvador, Guatemala, Guyana, Haiti, Honduras, Jamaica, Mexico, Nicaragua, Panama, Paraguay, Peru, Suriname, Trinidad and Tobago, United States, Uruguay, Venezuela
2014	Argentina, Bahamas, Barbados, Belize, Bolivia, Brazil, Canada, Chile, Colombia, Costa Rica, Dominican Republic, Ecuador, El Salvador, Guatemala, Guyana, Haiti, Honduras, Jamaica, Mexico, Nicaragua, Panama, Paraguay, Peru, Suriname, Trinidad and Tobago, United States, Uruguay, Venezuela
2016/17	Argentina, Bolivia, Brazil, Canada, Chile, Colombia, Costa Rica, Dominican Republic, Ecuador, El Salvador, Guatemala, Guyana, Haiti, Honduras, Jamaica, Mexico, Nicaragua, Panama, Paraguay, Peru, United States, Uruguay, Venezuela
2018/19	Argentina, Bolivia, Brazil, Canada, Chile, Colombia, Costa Rica, Dominican Republic, Ecuador, El Salvador, Guatemala, Honduras, Jamaica, Mexico, Nicaragua, Panama, Paraguay, Peru, United States, Uruguay, Venezuela
2021	Argentina, Bolivia, Brazil, Canada, Chile, Colombia, Costa Rica, Dominican Republic, Ecuador, El Salvador, Guatemala, Guyana, Haiti, Honduras, Jamaica, Mexico, Nicaragua, Panama, Paraguay, Peru, United States, Uruguay

== Methods and practices ==
The methods and practices include the following:

=== Pre-survey ===
- Solicitation of input from a vast network of academics, practitioners, and policymakers
- Use of Vanderbilt University’s experimental research lab to test new items
- Extensive in-country pre-testing of survey items
- Translation of surveys into more than 15 languages spoken in the Americas
- Expert design of national probability samples
- Approval from Vanderbilt University’s Institutional Review Board for the protection of human subjects

=== Implementation ===
- Training of all interviewers using guidelines published in training manuals
- Partnerships with survey organizations in the regions
- Use of electronic handheld devices (PDAs and smartphones) and software designed by LAPOP to allow multilingual interviews and validity checks

=== Post-survey ===
- Use of statistical programs and methods
- Presentation of results in clear, user-friendly graphs
- Public dissemination of results in surveyed design and methods on the LAPOP website
- Immediate uploading of data into LAPOP’s free interactive data analysis program

=== Interactive Data Tool ===
AmericasBarometer provides a free and interactive data tool called the Data Playground. As of June 2025, the tool includes weighted data from 2004 to 2023 and focuses on descriptive statistics from core questionnaire items (commonly asked questions in most countries and in most survey rounds).

== See also ==
- Arab Barometer
- Eurobarometer
- Afrobarometer
- Roper Center for Public Opinion Research
