= The Immanent Frame =

- Secularism, Religion, and the Public Sphere
- Editor: Mona Oraby
- Categories: Digital Publication
- Publisher: Social Science Research Council
- Founder: Jonathan VanAntwerpen
- Founded: 2007
- Country: United States
- Based in: Brooklyn, New York
- Language: English
- Website: http://tif.ssrc.org/

The Immanent Frame is a digital forum that publishes interdisciplinary perspectives on secularism, religion, and the public sphere. It was formed in conjunction with projects on religion and the public sphere at the Social Science Research Council (SSRC). Initially conceived as an experimental blog that invited multiple contributions from a number of leading scholars in the humanities and social sciences, The Immanent Frame was established in October 2007 by an SSRC team led by program director Jonathan VanAntwerpen, who served for several years as editor-in-chief.

Among other topics, The Immanent Frame launched with an extensive discussion of Charles Taylor's A Secular Age (Harvard University Press, 2007). Sociologist Robert Bellah called A Secular Age "one of the most important books to be written in my lifetime." The Immanent Frame's discussion of Taylor's book included original contributions by Robert Bellah, Wendy Brown, Charles Taylor, and several others. The name of the digital forum itself alludes to a central concept in Taylor's book.

In 2008, The Immanent Frame was named an official honoree of the 12th annual Webby Awards and a "favorite new religion site, egghead division" by The Revealer. In September 2011, The Immanent Frame partnered with Killing the Buddha to launch Frequencies, which was later named an official honoree of the 16th annual Webby Awards.

Recent forums at The Immanent Frame include "Nature and normativity: New inquiries into the natural world," "Modernity's resonances: New inquiries into the secular," and "Antiblackness as religion: Black living, Black dying, and Covid-19." In November 2019, Mona Oraby, The Immanent Frame's current editor, worked with Daniel Vaca and others to launch another special project, entitled The Universe of Terms, which asked how scholars might "advance the academic study and public understanding of religion and secularism in a way that meets college students' demand for visual imagery, pithy prose, and compelling narratives."

Contributors to The Immanent Frame have included: Arjun Appadurai, Talal Asad, Rajeev Bhargava, Akeel Bilgrami, José Casanova, Craig Calhoun, Dipesh Chakrabarty, William E. Connolly, Veena Das, Hent de Vries, Wendy Doniger, Simon During, John Esposito, Nilüfer Göle, David Hollinger, Mark Juergensmeyer, Mark Lilla, Kathryn Lofton, Tanya Luhrmann, Saba Mahmood, Martin E. Marty, Tomoko Masuzawa, Russell T. McCutcheon, Birgit Meyer, John Milbank, John Lardas Modern, Tariq Modood, Jean-Claude Monod, Ebrahim Moosa, Samuel Moyn, Robert Orsi, Ann Pellegrini, Elizabeth Povinelli, Vijay Prashad, Robert D. Putnam, Olivier Roy, Joan Wallach Scott, Jonathan Z. Smith, Judith Stacey, Alfred Stepan, Winnifred Fallers Sullivan, Mark C. Taylor, Peter van der Veer, Michael Warner, Nicholas Wolterstorff, Molly Worthen, and many others.

In 2016, The Immanent Frame established its first editorial board. Board members included sociologists Courtney Bender and Ruth Braunstein, political scientist Elizabeth Shakman Hurd, anthropologists Saba Mahmood and Mayanthi Fernando, historian Daniel Vaca, among others. Recent additions to The Immanent Frame's editorial board include Vaughn Booker, Todne Thomas, and Nathan Schneider.
