= Lisa Baldez =

American political scientist

- Education: Princeton University; University of California, San Diego
- Awards: Victoria Schuck Award, APSA
- Scientific career
- Fields: Political science
- Workplaces: Rochester Institute of Technology; University of Rochester; Washington University in St. Louis; Harvard University; Dartmouth College

Lisa Baldez is an American political scientist and scholar of Latin American Studies. She is a professor of Government at Dartmouth College, where she was also Cheheyl Professor and director of the Dartmouth Center for the Advancement of Learning at Dartmouth College from 2015 until 2018. She studies the relationship between political institutions and gender equality, and has written about the United Nations Convention on the Elimination of All Forms of Discrimination Against Women, women's protests in Chile, gender quota laws, and the Equal Rights Amendment.

== Education and early work ==
Baldez attended Princeton University, where she earned a BA in Latin American studies in 1986. She then completed an MA in political science at the University of California, San Diego in 1992, followed by a political science Ph.D. there in 1997. Her dissertation received an honorable mention for the 1998 Best Dissertation Prize from the Women and Politics Section of the American Political Science Association.

In spring of 1997, Baldez worked as an adjunct professor at Rochester Institute of Technology, University of Rochester, and in 1997 she joined the political science faculty at Washington University in St. Louis. From 1999 to 2002, Baldez was a Harbison Faculty Fellow at Washington University in St. Louis. In Spring 2003, she was a visiting professor at Harvard University. In 2003, she became a professor at Dartmouth College.

== Career ==
In 2002, Baldez published the book Why Women Protest: Women's Movements in Chile, in which she studies what causes women to protest, and in what situations they make their gender identity salient as part of their protests. Baldez focuses on the struggle for women's suffrage in Chile, as well as on two major episodes of protests by women in Chile during the 1970s and 1980s: the protests against Salvador Allende and against Augusto Pinochet. In both of these cases women's political mobilization was a major factor in undermining the legitimacy of a regime, even though these movements were in many ways ideologically opposite. Baldez theorizes that women form major social movements when partisan realignment gives them the opportunity to do so, and they are able to frame their exclusion from public life as a reason to protest apart from partisan differences. She tests this idea using archival material and research interviews with activists who were involved in the two movements.

Baldez published a second book, Defying Convention: US Resistance to the UN Treaty on Women's Rights, in 2014. In Defying Convention, Baldez studies why the United States was one of very few countries that had not ratified the United Nations Convention on the Elimination of All Forms of Discrimination Against Women, which pledges to put an end to war and establishes gender equality. Baldez examines this decision in the context of the historical development of a global norm of women's rights, and attributes American non-ratification partly to division among women's groups domestically on how best to achieve gender equality, and partly to United States obstructionism at the UN towards any initiatives by the Soviet Union and its allies. She also studies how the interpretation of the text of the treaty evolved in the years after its drafting, so that the effective meaning of ratifying the treaty might be understood to have changed over time, which complicates the study of why the United States did not ratify the text in different periods. Baldez structures her discussion using historical process tracing, and compares the possibility of America ratifying the Convention on the Elimination of All Forms of Discrimination Against Women to its ratification of the International Convention on the Elimination of All Forms of Racial Discrimination nearly 30 years after that convention's initial drafting. Defying Convention won the 2015 Victoria Schuck Award from the American Political Science Association, which is given each year for "the best book published on women and politics" in the previous year. It also won the 2015 Best Book Award from the Human Rights Section of the American Political Science Association.

In addition to her articles in peer-reviewed academic journals and her chapters in edited books, Baldez was also an editor of the 2008 volume Political Women and American Democracy: Critical Perspectives on Women and Politics Research, together with Christina Wolbrecht and Karen Beckwith. From 2015 until 2018, Baldez was Cheheyl Professor and director of the Dartmouth Center for the Advancement of Learning at Dartmouth College.

Baldez was a founding co-editor of the journal Politics & Gender in 2004. Her work has been cited, or she has been quoted, in news outlets like Vox, KQED-FM, and Bloomberg News.

== Selected works ==
- Why Women Protest: Women's Movements in Chile (2002)
- "Elected Bodies: The Gender Quota Law for Legislative Candidates in Mexico", Legislative Studies Quarterly (2011)
- Defying Convention: US Resistance to the UN Treaty on Women's Rights (2014)

== Selected awards ==
- Victoria Schuck Award, American Political Science Association (2015)
- Best Book Award, Human Rights Section of the American Political Science Association (2015)
