= USBE =

USBE may refer to:

- Umeå School of Business
- United States Bureau of Efficiency
- Utah State Board of Education
