= Christina Wolbrecht =

American political scientist

- Education: Pacific Lutheran University; Washington University in St. Louis
- Awards: Leon Epstein Award, APSA; Victoria Schuck Award, APSA
- Scientific career
- Fields: Political science
- Workplaces: University of Notre Dame

Christina Wolbrecht is an American political scientist. She is a professor of political science at the University of Notre Dame, where she is also Director of the Rooney Center for the Study of American Democracy, and the C. Robert and Margaret Hanley Family Director of the Notre Dame Washington Program. She studies the representation of women in politics, American voting behavior during the 20th century, the effects of women's suffrage, and how women in politics can function as public role models.

== Education and early work ==
Wolbrecht attended Pacific Lutheran University, graduating with a BA in political science in 1992. She then received an MA in political science from Washington University in St. Louis in 1994, and a PhD there in 1997. Wolbrecht's PhD dissertation won the Best Dissertation Award from the Women and Politics Section of the American Political Science Association. After obtaining her PhD, Wolbrecht joined the political science faculty at the University of Notre Dame.

== Career ==
In 2000, Wolbrecht published The Politics of Women's Rights: Parties, Positions, and Change. The book studies why there was a major party issue realignment in the United States from 1952 to 1992, with the two major parties both changing their positions related to women's rights. Wolbrecht attributes the parties' positions to forces which relate to the issue itself, the party coalitions around that issue, and the position of party elites on the issue, and details how these changed with respect to women's rights in America during the second half of the 20th century. The Politics of Women's Rights won the 2001 Leon Epstein Outstanding Book Award from the Political Organizations and Parties section of the American Political Science Association, which "recognizes a book published in the last two calendar years that made an outstanding contribution to research and scholarship on political organizations and parties".

Wolbrecht published her second book in 2017: Counting Women's Ballots: Female Voters from Suffrage through the New Deal, coauthored with J. Kevin Corder. The book studies women's vote choice and turnout during the US presidential elections between 1920 and 1936. Wolbrecht and Corder address the difficulty of determining the impact of American women's votes after women's suffrage was enacted using ecological inference to fill in information about vote choice and turnout that is not available through survey data alone. They demonstrate that, contrary to past analyses, voter turnout was not substantially reduced by women's suffrage, and that while women bolstered the success of the Republican Party immediately after suffrage, by the time of the New Deal many women had switched to the Democratic Party. Counting Women's Ballots won the 2017 Victoria Schuck Award from the American Political Science Association, which is "given annually for the best book published on women and politics".

Corder and Wolbrecht also coauthored the 2020 book A Century of Votes for Women: American Elections Since Suffrage. Additionally, Wolbrecht has edited three books, and has served as co-editor with Susan Franceschet of the journal Politics & Gender.

Wolbrecht has published articles in media outlets including The Washington Post, Vox, and Newsweek. She has discussed the history of women's voting behavior in the US on C-SPAN, and been quoted in outlets like Teen Vogue, Politico, and The Michigan Daily.

== Selected works ==
- The Politics of Women's Rights: Parties, Positions, and Change (2000)
- Counting Women's Ballots: Female Voters from Suffrage through the New Deal (2017)
- A Century of Votes for Women: American Elections Since Suffrage, with J. Kevin Corder (2020)

== Selected awards ==
- Leon Epstein Outstanding Book Award, American Political Science Association (2001)
- Victoria Schuck Award, American Political Science Association (2017)
