= Bibliography of African women =

A Bibliography of books about African women. Entries are ordered by author alphabetically:

== A ==
- Allman, Jean; Geiger, Susan; Musisi, Nakanyike (1 April 2002). Women in African Colonial Histories. Indiana University Press. ISBN 0-253-10887-X.
- Almeida, Irène Assiba d' (1994). Francophone African Women Writers: Destroying the Emptiness of Silence. University Press of Florida. ISBN 978-0-8130-1302-2.
- Amadiume, Ifi (2000). Daughters of the Goddess, Daughters of Imperialism: African Women Struggle for Culture, Power and Democracy. Zed Books. ISBN 978-1856498067.
- Arthur, J. (28 September 2009). African Women Immigrants in the United States: Crossing Transnational Borders. Springer. ISBN 978-0-230-62391-0.

== B ==
- Bennett, Michael; Dickerson, Vanessa D. (2001). Recovering the Black Female Body: Self-representations by African American Women. Rutgers University Press. ISBN 978-0-8135-2839-7.
- Berger, Iris; White, E. Frances (January 1999). Women in Sub-Saharan Africa: Restoring Women to History. Indiana University Press. ISBN 0-253-33476-4.
- Box, Laura Chakravarty (10 February 2005). Strategies of Resistance in the Dramatic Texts of North African Women: A Body of Words. Routledge. p. 50. ISBN 978-1-135-93207-7.
- Busby, Margaret (1992). Daughters of Africa: An International Anthology of Words and Writings by Women of African Descent. Jonathan Cape. ISBN 978-0224035927.
- Buskens, Ineke; Webb, Anne (15 April 2009). African Women and ICTs: Creating New Spaces with Technology. IDRC. ISBN 978-1-84813-192-7.

== C ==
- Clark, Gracia (2010). African Market Women: Seven Life Stories from Ghana. Indiana University Press. ISBN 0-253-22154-4.
- Coquery-Vidrovitch, Catherine (1997). African Women: A Modern History. Westview Press. ISBN 978-0-8133-2361-9.
- Courtney-Clarke, Margaret (1990). African Canvas: The Art of West African Women. Random House Incorporated. ISBN 978-0-8478-1166-3.

== E ==
- Emenyo̲nu, Ernest (2006). New Directions in African Literature: A Review. James Currey Publishers. ISBN 978-0-85255-570-5.

== F ==
- Fuller, L. (27 October 2008). African Women's Unique Vulnerabilities to HIV/AIDS: Communication Perspectives and Promises. Springer. ISBN 978-0-230-61620-2.

== G ==
- Gasa, Nomboniso (2007). Women in South African History: They Remove Boulders and Cross Rivers. HSRC Press. ISBN 978-0-7969-2174-1.
- Gill, LaVerne McCain (2000). Daughters of Dignity: African Women in the Bible and the Virtues of Black Womanhood. Pilgrim Press. ISBN 978-0-8298-1373-9.
- Goetz, Anne-Marie; Hassim, Shireen (18 July 2003). No Shortcuts to Power: African Women in Politics and Policy Making. Zed Books. ISBN 978-1-84277-147-1.

== H ==
- Hafkin, Nancy; Bay, Edna G. (1 June 1976). Women in Africa: Studies in Social and Economic Change. Stanford University Press. ISBN 978-0-8047-6624-1.
- Hay, Margaret Jean (1995). African Women South of the Sahara. Longman Group. ISBN 978-0-582-21241-1.
- Hernandez, Jennifer Browdy de; Dongala, Pauline; Jolaosho, Omotayo (19 August 2010). African Women Writing Resistance: An Anthology of Contemporary Voices. Univ of Wisconsin Press. ISBN 978-0-299-23663-2.
- Hitchcott, Nicki (2000). Women writers in Francophone Africa. Berg. ISBN 978-1-85973-346-2.

== J ==
- James, Adeola (January 1990). In Their Own Voices: African Women Writers Talk. James Currey Publishers. ISBN 978-0-85255-507-1.
- Japtok, Martin (2003). Postcolonial Perspectives on Women Writers from Africa, the Caribbean, and the US. Africa World Press. ISBN 978-1-59221-068-8.

== L ==
- Lee, Rebekah (15 December 2009). African Women and Apartheid: Migration and Settlement in Urban South Africa. I.B. Tauris. ISBN 978-1-84511-819-8.
- Little, Kenneth (1973). African Women in Towns: An Aspect of Africa's Social Revolution. CUP Archive. ISBN 978-0-521-09819-9.

== M ==
- Mukasa, Rosemary Semafumu (2008). The African Women's Protocol: Harnessing a Potential Force for Positive Change. Fanele. ISBN 978-1-920196-08-0.
- Musa, Roselynn; Mohammed, Faiza Jama; Manji, Firoze Madatally (2006). Breathing Life Into the African Union Protocol on Women's Rights in Africa. Solidarity for African Women's Rights. ISBN 978-1-904855-66-8.

== N ==
- Nelson, Nicki (28 October 2013). African Women in the Development Process. Routledge. ISBN 978-1-136-28118-1.
- Newell, Stephanie (1997). Writing African women: gender, popular culture, and literature in West Africa. Zed Books. ISBN 978-1-85649-449-6.
- Nfah-Abbenyi, Juliana Makuchi (1997). Gender in African Women's Writing: Identity, Sexuality, and Difference. Indiana University Press. ISBN 0-253-21149-2.
- Nnaemeka, Obioma (2005). Female Circumcision and the Politics of Knowledge: African Women in Imperialist Discourses. Greenwood Publishing Group. ISBN 978-0-89789-864-5.
- Nyengele, Mpyana Fulgence (2004). African Women's Theology, Gender Relations, and Family Systems Theory: Pastoral Theological Considerations and Guidelines for Care and Counseling. Peter Lang. ISBN 978-0-8204-6777-1.

== O ==
- Oduyoye, Mercy (1 April 2001). Introducing African Women's Theology. A&C Black. ISBN 978-1-84127-143-9.
- Ogundipe-Leslie, Molara (1994). Re-creating Ourselves: African Women & Critical Transformations. Africa World Press. ISBN 978-0-86543-412-7.

== P ==
- Paulme, Denise (5 November 2013). Women of Tropical Africa. Routledge. ISBN 978-1-136-53297-9.
- Perkins, Kathy A. (2009). African Women Playwrights. University of Illinois Press. ISBN 978-0-252-07573-5.
- Perkins, Kathy (16 January 2006). Black South African Women: An Anthology of Plays. Routledge. ISBN 978-1-134-67358-2.

== R ==
- Robertson, Claire C.; Klein, Martin A. (1983). Women and slavery in Africa. Heinemann.
- Robins, Gay (January 1993). Women in Ancient Egypt. Harvard University Press. ISBN 978-0-674-95469-4.
- Rwomire, Apollo (2001). African Women and Children: Crisis and Response. Greenwood Publishing Group. ISBN 978-0-275-96218-0.

== S ==
- Saadawi, Nawal El (1975). Woman at Point Zero. London: Zed Books.
- Sekyiamah, Nana Darkoa (2021). The Sex Lives of African Women. London: Dialogue.
- Sheldon, Kathleen (4 March 2016). Historical Dictionary of Women in Sub-Saharan Africa. Rowman & Littlefield. ISBN 978-1-4422-6293-5.
- Shetler, Jan Bender (5 May 2015). Gendering Ethnicity in African Women’s Lives. University of Wisconsin Pres. ISBN 978-0-299-30394-5.
- Snyder, Margaret C.; Tadesse, Mary; Women, African Training and Research Centre for (1995). African women and development: a history. Witwatersrand University Press. ISBN 978-1-85649-299-7.

== T ==
- Terborg-Penn, Rosalyn (1998). African American Women in the Struggle for the Vote, 1850-1920. Indiana University Press. ISBN 0-253-21176-X.
- Toit, Brian M. du (25 September 1990). Aging and Menopause Among Indian South African Women. SUNY Press. ISBN 978-0-7914-0390-7.
- Turshen, Meredeth (2000). African Women's Health. Africa World Press. ISBN 978-0-86543-812-5.

== U ==
- Uchem, Rose N. (2001). Overcoming Women's Subordination in the Igbo African Culture and in the Catholic Church: Envisioning an Inclusive Theology with Reference to Women. Universal-Publishers. p. 24. ISBN 978-1-58112-133-9.

== V ==
- Veney, Cassandra Rachel (2001). Women in African Studies Scholarly Publishing. Africa World Press. ISBN 978-0-86543-923-8.
- Vera, Yvonne (1999). Opening Spaces: An Anthology of Contemporary African Women's Writing. Heinemann. ISBN 978-0-435-91010-5.

== W ==
- Waithera, Dr (2011). Don't Sleep African Women: Powerlessness and HIV/AIDS Vulnerability Among Kenyan Women. Dorrance Publishing. ISBN 978-1-4349-4505-1.

== See also ==
- Bibliography of Nigerian women
