= Bumiller =

Bumiller is a surname. Notable people with the surname include:

- Elisabeth Bumiller (born 1956), American author and journalist
- Kristin Bumiller, American political scientist

== See also ==
- Bumiller Building, historic building in Los Angeles, California, U.S.
