= Victoria Schuck Award =

Annual book prize conferred by APSA

- Awarded for: Best book on women and politics
- Sponsored by: American Political Science Association
- Presented by: American Political Science Association
- Website: https://www.apsanet.org/PROGRAMS/APSA-Awards/Victoria-Schuck-Award

The Victoria Schuck Award is an annual prize granted by the American Political Science Association to the author of the best book published in the previous year on the topic of women and politics. The award is named in honor of the political scientist Victoria Schuck. Although a number of area-specific sections of the American Political Science Association have dedicated book awards, the Schuck Award is one of only a few awards given directly by the Association rather than by a subsection of it.

== History ==
The prize was established in 1986 by the American Political Science Association's Executive Director Thomas E. Mann, its President Aaron Wildavsky, and its Executive Council, at the urging of Victoria Schuck. It was originally endowed by Schuck at a value of $500 per award, out of a fund that she donated totaling $3000. By 2020 the award carried a prize of $750.

The committee that awards the prize consists of political scientists who are members of the American Political Science Association; the first prize was awarded by Susan J. Carroll, Jean Bethke Elshtain, and Norma Noonan.

== Past winners ==
The past recipients of the prize in each year are as follows:

- 1988 Rebecca E. Klatch, Women of the new right
- 1988 Jane Mansbridge, Why we lost the ERA
- 1989 Zillah R. Eisenstein, The female body and the law
- 1989 Carole Pateman, The sexual contract
- 1990 Susan Moller Okin, Justice, gender and the family
- 1990 Judith Stiehm, Arms and the enlisted woman
- 1991 Jane Sherron De Hart and Donald G. Mathews, Sex, gender, and the politics of ERA : a state and the nation
- 1991 Iris M. Young, Sex, Gender, and the Politics of Sex: A State and a Nation
- 1992 Nancie Caraway, Segregated sisterhood: racism and the politics of American feminism
- 1992 Anne Phillips, Engendering democracy
- 1993 Virginia Sapiro, A vindication of political virtue: the political theory of Mary Wollstonecraft
- 1994 Cynthia R. Daniels, At women's expense: state power and the politics of fetal rights
- 1995 Barbara J. Nelson and Najma Chowdhury, Women and politics worldwide
- 1996 Gwendolyn Mink, The wages of motherhood: inequality in the welfare state, 1917-1942
- 1997 Kristi Andersen, After suffrage: women in partisan and electoral politics before the New Deal
- 1998 Uma Narayan, Dislocating cultures: identities, traditions, and Third-World feminism
- 1999 Mary Fainsod Katzenstein, Faithful and fearless: moving feminist protest inside the church and military
- 2000 Judith A. Baer, Our lives before the law: constructing a feminist jurisprudence
- 2001 Jean Reith Schroedel, Is the fetus a person? A comparison of policies across the fifty states
- 2001 Aili Mari Tripp, Women & politics in Uganda
- 2002 Sidney Verba, Kay Lehman Schlozman, and Nancy Burns, The private roots of public action: gender, equality, and political participation
- 2002 Joshua S. Goldstein, War and gender: how gender shapes the war system and vice versa
- 2003 Louise Chappell, Gendering Government: Feminist Engagement with the State in Australia and Canada
- 2004 Nancy J. Hirschmann, Subject of Liberty: Toward a Feminist Theory of Freedom
- 2005 Saba Mahmood, Politics of Piety: The Islamic Revival and the Feminist Subject
- 2006 Valentine M. Moghadam, Globalizing Women: Transnational Feminist Networks
- 2007 Shireen Hassim, Women's Organizations and Democracy in South Africa: Contesting Authority
- 2007 Kathrin S. Zippel, The Politics of Sexual Harassment: A Comparative Study of the United States, the European Union, and Germany
- 2008 Georgina Waylen, Engendering Transitions: Women’s Mobilization, Institutions, and Gender Outcomes
- 2008 Anna Marie Smith, Welfare Reform and Sexual Regulation
- 2009 Kristin Bumiller, In an Abusive State: How Neoliberalism Appropriated the Feminist Movement Against Sexual Violence
- 2010 Mona Lena Krook, Quotas for Women in Politics: Gender and Candidate Selection Reform Worldwide
- 2011 Torben Iversen and Frances Rosenbluth, Women, Work & Politics: The Political Economy of Gender Inequality
- 2012 S. Laurel Weldon, When Protest Makes Policy: How Social Movements Represent Disadvantages Groups
- 2013 Myra Marx Ferree, Varieties of Feminism: German Gender Politics in Global Perspective
- 2014 Deborah Jordan Brooks, He Runs, She Runs: Why Gender Stereotypes Do Not Harm Women Candidates
- 2015 Lisa Baldez, Defying Convention: U.S. Resistance to the U.N. Treaty on Women's Rights
- 2016 Sarah Deer, The Beginning and End of Rape: Confronting Sexual Violence in Native America
- 2017 J. Kevin Corder and Christina Wolbrecht, Counting Women's Ballots: Female voters from Suffrage to through the New Deal
- 2018 Kara Ellerby, No Shortcut to Change: An Unlikely Path to a More Gender Equitable World
- 2019 Brooke Ackerly, Just Responsibility: A Human Rights Theory of Global Justice
- 2020 Melody Ellis Valdini, The Inclusion Calculation: Why Men Appropriate Women’s Representation
- 2021 Christina Wolbrecht and J. Kevin Corder, A Century of Votes
- 2022 Laurel Elder, The Partisan Gap: Why Democratic Women Get Elected But Republican Women Don’t
- 2023 Ke Li, Marriage Unbound: State Law, Power, and Inequality in Contemporary China
- 2024 Soledad Artiz Prillaman, The Patriarchal Political Order: The Making and Unraveling of the Gendered Participation Gap in India
