= Mary E. Schick =

American librarian

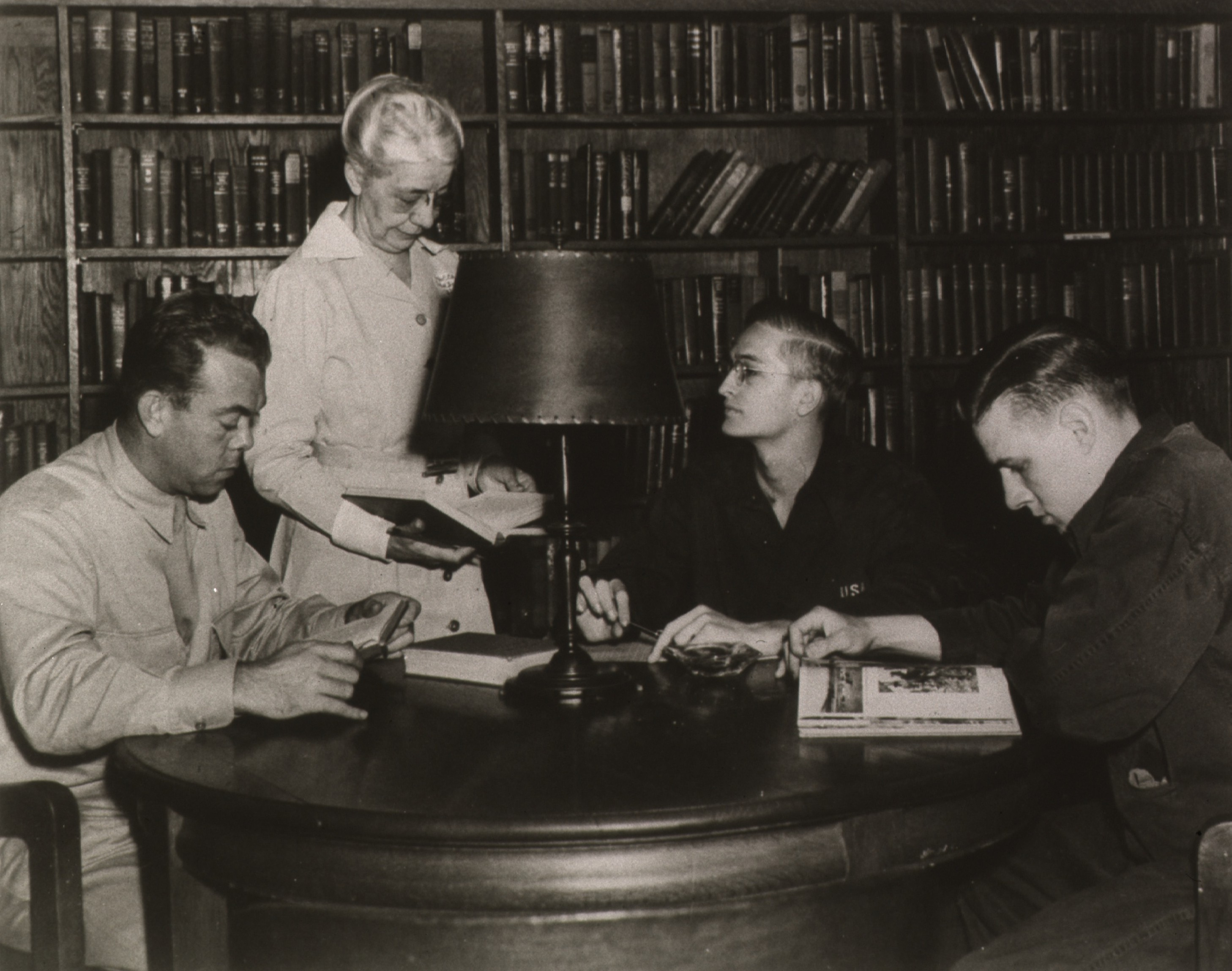
- Schick in the Walter Reed Library in 1951
- Born: July 28, 1885; Meyersdale, Pennsylvania, US
- Died: June 25, 1951 (aged 65)
- Education: Hood College; Drexel University
- Occupation: Librarian
- Years active: 1911–1951
- Known for: Director of the Walter Reed Library

Mary Elizabeth Schick (July 28, 1885 – June 25, 1951) was an American librarian who served as the director and first professional librarian at the Walter Reed Library at the Walter Reed Army Medical Center (WRAMC), where she worked from 1920 to 1951. She compiled the history of the first 40 years of WRAMC. She previously worked at the U.S. Soldier's Home, National Defense Council, and the U.S. Bureau of Efficiency.

== Early life and education ==
Schick was born in Meyersdale, Pennsylvania and moved to Washington, D.C. in 1900. She graduated from Central High School and Hood College, getting her library training at Drexel.

== Career ==
Schick accepted a position at the U.S. Soldier's Home in 1911 where she acted as librarian, moving on to the Information Services of the National Defense Council in 1917 and with a brief period as a special assistant in the U.S. Bureau of Efficiency. In 1919, she accepted a job as director and librarian at Walter Reed Army Medical Center's (WRAMC) library with the promise of being able to build a great hospital library for the medical center. Schick was the first professional librarian at the Walter Reed Library, where she worked from 1920 to 1951. She compiled the history of the first 40 years of the WRAMC which Mary Walker Standlee assembled into a manuscript that wasn't published until 2007.
