= Georgina Waylen =

British political scientist

Georgina Nicola Alexandra Waylen, FBA, FAcSS (born 1959) is a British political scientist, specialising in comparative politics, political economy, and gender and politics. Since April 2012, she has been Professor of Politics at the University of Manchester. She previously taught at the University of Sheffield, the University of Salford and the University of East Anglia. She was a visiting scholar at the Minda de Gunzburg Center for European Studies, Harvard University from 2016 to 2017, and has been a visiting professor in the Department of Gender Studies at the London School of Economics since 2018.

== Education ==
Waylen studied politics and economics at the University of Manchester, graduating with a Bachelor of Arts (BA) degree in 1981. She remained at Manchester to undertake postgraduate studies in political development between 1981 and 1983, graduating with a Master of Arts (MA) degree. She then joined Huddersfield Polytechnic to undertake her Doctor of Philosophy (PhD) degree. Her doctoral thesis was titled "British capital, local capital and the role of the state in the political economy of Jamaica 1920-1940". As Huddersfield Polytechnic did not have degree awarding powers, she was awarded her PhD by the Council for National Academic Awards (CNAA) in 1988.

== Honours ==
Waylen was awarded the 2008 Victoria Schuck Award by the American Political Science Association for her book Engendering Transitions: Women’s Mobilization, Institutions, and Gender Outcomes.

Waylen was elected a Fellow of the Academy of Social Sciences (FAcSS) in 2010. In July 2018, she was elected a Fellow of the British Academy (FBA), the United Kingdom's national academy for the humanities and social sciences.

== Selected works ==
- Waylen, Georgina (1996). Gender in Third World politics. London: Open University Press. ISBN 978-0335157709.
- Waylen, Georgina (2007). Engendering transitions: women's mobilization, institutions, and gender outcomes. Oxford: Oxford University Press. ISBN 978-0199248032.
- Waylen, Georgina; Celis, Karen; Kantola, Johanna; Weldon, Laurel, eds. (2013). The Oxford handbook of gender and politics. Oxford: Oxford University Press. ISBN 978-0199751457.
- Waylen, Georgina, ed. (2017). Gender and informal institutions. Lanham, MD: Rowman & Littlefield International. ISBN 978-1786600028.
