= Nancy Hirschmann =

American political scientist

- Born: April 25, 1956 (age 70)
- Awards: Victoria Schuck Award

Academic background
- Education: A.B., American studies, Smith College; MA, 1982, PhD, political science, 1987, Johns Hopkins University
- Thesis: Political obligation and feminist theory (1988)

Nancy Joan Hirschmann (born April 25, 1956) is an American political scientist. She is the Geraldine R. Segal Professor in American Social Thought at the University of Pennsylvania where she specializes in the history of political thought, analytical philosophy, feminist theory, disability theory, and the intersection of political theory and public policy.

== Early life and education ==
Hirschmann was born on April 25, 1956. She completed her Bachelor of Arts degree at Smith College before enrolling at Johns Hopkins University for her Master's degree and PhD.

== Career ==
Following her PhD, Hirschmann joined Swarthmore College as an assistant professor from 1987 to 1990. She eventually left the college to teach in the Department of Government at Cornell University until 2002 when she joined the Department of Political Science at University of Pennsylvania (UPenn). Upon joining UPenn as an associate professor, Hirschmann received the 2004 Victoria Schuck Award from the American Political Science Association for her book The Subject of Liberty: Toward a Feminist Theory of Freedom. The book examines the traditional Western understanding of freedom in the context of contemporary issues such as domestic violence, welfare reform, and Islamic veiling. Following this, she was also promoted to the rank of Full professor of political science. In this new role, Hirschmann accepted a research fellowship from the National Endowment for the Humanities to support her work A Political Theory of Disability and Illness. She then published two books; an edited volume of Feminist Interpretations of John Locke and Gender, Class, and Freedom in Modern Political Theory. In 2007, Hirschmann was promoted to the rank of R. Jean Brownlee Endowed Term Professor as a faculty member committed to women's studies at Penn.

As the Jean R. Brownlee Endowed Term Professor in political science, Hirschman continued to research and advocate for disability research. In 2011, she co-established a conference at UPenn aimed at "bringing together scholars from various fields to discuss disability and citizenship in U.S. history, disability and sexuality and new directions in the theoretical field." Following this, she was elected vice president of the American Political Science Association for a one year term and delivered an invited lecture at the Sorbonne University in France on "Relational Autonomy, or Relational Freedom? A Return to Psychoanalysis." Prior to the start of the 2014–15 academic year, Hirschman succeeded Christine Poggi as director of the Gender, Sexuality and Women’s Studies Program (GSWS) and Alice Paul Center for Research on Gender, Sexuality, and Women. While serving in this role, she joined the editorial board of The Journal of Politics and Political Research Quarterly.

Throughout her tenure at UPenn, Hirschmann’s work has focused on the history of political thought, analytical philosophy, feminist theory, the intersection of political theory and public policy. In 2017, this accumulated into various fellowships including the American Council of Learned Societies, Center for Advanced Study in the Behavioral Sciences at Stanford University, the National Humanities Center, and the European University Institute. The following year, Hirschmann was appointed the Stanley I. Sheerr Term Professor in the Social Sciences while also continuing to serve as graduate chair and vice chair of the Department of Political Science. Three years later, she received a new appointment as the Geraldine R. Segal Professors in American Social Thought alongside Anthea Butler of Religious Studies.

== Books ==
- The Subject of Liberty: Toward a Feminist Theory of Freedom. 2012. Princeton University Press.
- Feminist Interpretations of Thomas Hobbes, co-edited with Joanne Wright. 2013. Pennsylvania State University Press.
- Gender, Class, and Freedom in Modern Political Theory. 2007. Princeton University Press.
- Feminist Interpretations of John Locke, co-edited with Kirstie M. McClure. 2007. Pennsylvania State University Press.
- The Subject of Liberty: Toward A Feminist Theory of Freedom. 2003. Princeton University Press.
- Women and Welfare: Theory and Practice in the United States and Europe, co-edited with Ulrike Lieber. 2001. Rutgers University Press.
- Revisioning the Political: Feminist Reconstructions of Traditional Concepts in Western Political Theory, co-edited with Christine Di Stefano. 1996. Westview Press.
- Rethinking Obligation: A Feminist Method for Political Theory. 1992. Cornell University Press.
