= Talal Asad =

British-Pakistani anthropologist (born 1932)

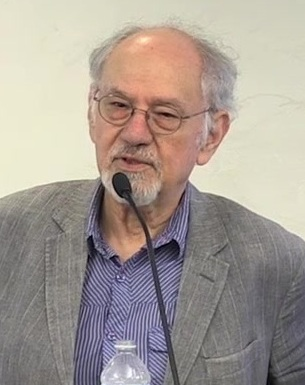
- Talal Asad in 2013
- Born: April 1932 (age 94); Medina, Kingdom of Hejaz and Nejd (present-day Saudi Arabia)
- Citizenship: Saudi Arabian (formerly); Pakistani; British
- Spouse: Tanya Asad
- Father: Muhammad Asad

Academic background
- Education: University of Edinburgh; University of Oxford
- Thesis: The Kababish (1968)
- Doctoral advisor: E. E. Evans-Pritchard
- Influences: Muhammad Asad; Michel Foucault; Friedrich Nietzsche; Ludwig Wittgenstein

Academic work
- Discipline: Anthropology
- Sub-discipline: Anthropology of religion; cultural anthropology; postcolonial studies
- School or tradition: Postcolonialism; poststructuralism
- Institutions: University of Khartoum; University of Hull; New School for Social Research; Johns Hopkins University; CUNY Graduate Center
- Notable works: Formations of the Secular (2003)
- Influenced: Saba Mahmood; Tomoko Masuzawa

Talal Asad (born 1932) is a Saudi-born British cultural anthropologist who is currently Distinguished Professor Emeritus of Anthropology and Middle Eastern Studies at the Graduate Center of the City University of New York. His prolific body of work mainly focuses on religiosity, Middle Eastern studies, postcolonialism, and notions of power, law, and discipline. He is also known for his writing calling for an anthropology of secularism.

His work has had a significant influence beyond his home discipline of anthropology. As Donovan Schaefer writes:

The gravitational field of Asad’s influence has emanated far from his home discipline and reshaped the landscape of other humanistic disciplines around him.

== Biography ==
Talal Asad was born in April 1932 in Medina, Saudi Arabia. His parents are Muhammad Asad, an Austrian diplomat and writer who converted from Judaism to Islam in his twenties, and Munira Hussein Al Shammari, a Saudi Arabian Muslim. Asad was born in Saudi Arabia but when he was eight months old his family moved to British India, where his father was part of the Pakistan Movement. His parents divorced shortly before his father's third marriage. Talal was raised in Pakistan, and attended a Christian-run missionary boarding school. He is an alumnus of the St. Anthony High School in Lahore. Asad moved to the United Kingdom when he was 18 to attend university and studied architecture for two years before discovering anthropology, about which he has said “it was fun, but I was not terribly suited.”

Asad received his undergraduate degree in anthropology from the University of Edinburgh in 1959. He continued to train as a cultural anthropologist, receiving both a Bachelor of Letters and PhD from the University of Oxford, which he completed in 1968. Asad’s mentor while at Oxford was notable social anthropologist E.E. Evans-Pritchard, who Asad has since cited in many of his works. As an undergraduate in the anthropology department at Edinburgh University Talal Asad first met Dr. Tanya Baker, Assistant Professor of Anthropology, and they later married in January 1960, and the two travelled to Oxford where Talal Asad obtained his doctorate.

After his doctoral studies, Asad completed fieldwork in Northern Sudan on the political structures of the Kababish, a nomadic group that formed under British colonial rule. He published The Kababish Arabs: Power, Authority, and Consent in a Nomadic Tribe in 1970. Asad became increasingly interested in religiosity, power, and Orientalism throughout his studies. In the late 1960s, he formed a reading group that focused on material written in the Middle East. He recalls being struck by the bias and “theoretical poverty” of Orientalist writing, the assumptions taken for granted, and the questions that were not answered.

Throughout his career, Asad has been influenced by a broad spectrum of scholars, including notable figures such as Karl Marx, E.E. Evans-Pritchard, R.G. Collingwood, Ludwig Wittgenstein, and Michel Foucault. He has also cited the influence of contemporaries and colleagues such as John Milbank, Stanley Hauerwas, and Alasdair MacIntyre, as well as his former students Saba Mahmood and Charles Hirschkind.

== Career ==
Asad’s first teaching job was at Khartoum University in Sudan, where he spent several years as a lecturer in social anthropology. He returned to the United Kingdom in the early 1970s to lecture at Hull University in Hull, England. He moved to the United States in 1989, and taught at the New School for Social Research in New York City and Johns Hopkins University in Baltimore, before acquiring his current position of Distinguished Professor of Anthropology at the Graduate Center of the City University of New York. Asad has also held visiting professorships at Ain Shams University in Cairo, King Saud University in Riyadh, University of California at Berkeley, and the School for Advanced Studies in the Social Sciences in Paris.

Asad’s writing portfolio is extensive, and he has been involved in a variety of projects throughout his career. His books include Anthropology and the Colonial Encounter, published in 1973, Genealogies of Religion, published in 1993, Formations of the Secular, published in 2003, and On Suicide Bombing, published in 2007 and written in response to the September 11, 2001 attacks. In 1983, he was a co-editor on The Sociology of Developing Societies: The Middle East with economic historian Roger Owen. Asad has said that he wasn’t all that interested in this project and that he did it as a favor to a friend. In 2007 Asad was part of a symposium at the Townsend Center at University of California, Berkeley, at which he spoke on his paper "Is Critique Secular? Blasphemy, Injury, and Free Speech".

Since 2023, Ibn Haldun University has granted the annual Talal Asad Award for the best graduate dissertation in sociology. In 2026, the Society for the Anthropology of Religion (SAR) renamed its graduate student paper competition, which recognizes compelling ethnographies on religion, the Talal Asad Graduate Student Paper Prize.

He was elected a Fellow of the American Academy of Arts and Sciences in 2024. He also received an honorary degree of Doctor of Divinity by Edinburgh University in 2024.

== Contributions ==
Asad’s work generally involves taking an anthropological approach to political history and analysis, specifically with regard to colonial history and religion. Asad identifies himself as an anthropologist but also states that he is critical of allowing disciplines to be defined by particular techniques (such as ethnography or statistics, for example).

He is often critical of progress narratives, believing that “the assumption of social development following a linear path should be problematized.” Another main facet of his work is his public criticism of Orientalism. He has expressed frustration with Orientalist assumptions, particularly about religion, which he has said comes from his multicultural Muslim background. His father considered Islam to be primarily an intellectual idea, while his mother considered it an “embodied, unreflective way of living.” Asad’s own interest in religion was based in an attempt to engage with theoretical explorations and to make sense of political and personal experiences. He is particularly interested in conceptions of religion as an embodied practice and the role that discipline plays in this practice.

In an essay published in 1986, The Idea of an Anthropology of Islam, Talal Asad introduces a concept which has since marked a turning point in the study of Islam – discursive tradition.

Observing the multiplication of anthropological works on ‘Islam’ and ‘Muslims’ in Western anthropology at his time, Asad points at the simultaneous general incapacity to comprehend any of them. Most analyses, Asad notices, conclude on either the theoretical inexistence of Islam; the irreducible multiplicity of its forms; or define it as a total socio-historical structure. While each of these propositions holds some relevance, they remain unsatisfying – if not wrong due to an initial conceptual flaw, which he proposes to discuss, for ‘to conceptualize Islam as the object of an anthropological study is not as simple a matter as some writers would have one suppose.’ The very question to answer indeed, the starting point of any attempt at understanding Islam, is that of its correct defining – a seemingly basic point which nonetheless reveals paradigm-shifting when put into practice.

Asad’s intervention on Islam is nothing less than a critique of established anthropology as an ethnocentric, irreflexive and in that still much colonial discipline, in which paradigms and methods are to be challenged and revised in order for it to properly engage with human forms existing outside of its cultural cradle. He there specifically challenges two of the main anthropologists of religion, Clifford Geertz and Ernest Gellner, who, to him, impose on Islam a Western modern idea of religion, itself the product of a history of progressive separation of the latter from ‘the spheres of real power and reason such as politics, law, and science’. Asad argues for the importance of the historicization of both observer’s positions and analytical categories and their insertion within a certain power-knowledge moment and configuration, a theoretical approach he draws from Foucault. When it comes to understanding Islam, this implies the adoption of an internal perspective, ‘as Muslims do’, that is, ‘from the concept of a discursive tradition that includes and relates itself to the founding texts of the Qur'an and the Hadith.’

Asad defines tradition as a set of prescriptive discourses, taught and transmitted, that draw their legitimacy, power and meaning from history. They thereby found social cohesion through shared practices articulating the past, present and future of the group i.e Muslims. Asad’s discursive tradition, while pursuing the decentering project engaged by decolonial thinkers such as Edward Said, attempts at complexifying the dichotomy that had been constituted by scholars of Islam between Great and little traditions. While the first one was considered as followed by the elite, text-based and urban – and thus orthodox, the latter characterized the diversity of local practices of rural communities and, in opposition, was understood as heterodox. Yet, for Asad, there is no such thing as a clear distinction between texts and practices of Islam. On the contrary, texts, which do not have an agency by themselves, are practiced, that is read, discussed, made sense of and embodied by believers – and, this, within a given social structure, that is power-knowledge configuration. The relationship between Muslims and the texts is what makes Islam, Asad argues, making of orthodoxy ‘not just a body of opinion but a relationship of power’. This allows him to introduce a political economy perspective in the analysis of Islam, which, dismissed by Geertz and Gellner’s focus on dramatization, explains the diversity of its forms in different contexts.

Asad’s discursive tradition concept has been fundamental for a number of later Islam scholars, although diversely interpreted and prolonged, as noted by Ovamir Anjum. He, for instance, considers that Lukens-Bull misunderstands Asad when he talks of an orthodox Islam as based on the Qu’ran and Hadiths. He nonetheless considers that such a confusion reveals the limits of Asad’s proposition, which does not explain the articulation between local and global orthodoxies. Anjum thus argues for an enriching of the discursive tradition approach with world-system analyses applied to Islam.

Following the 2013 coup d’état in Egypt, Asad wrote an essay, "Thinking About Tradition, Religion, and Politics in Egypt Today", in which he engages with Hannah Arendt’s notions of revolution and tradition. Asad argues that the founding of a political tradition is marked by the necessity of violence, and both revolutions and coups use the narrative of necessary violence towards saving and securing the posterity of the nation. The difference, Arendt and Asad both agree on, is that a revolution involves a vision of beginning anew by founding a new tradition, a new system, whereas a coup is meant to replace individuals in power, therefore conserving a living tradition. This is just one of many notable essays Asad has written that deal with concepts of power, discipline, and law.

William E. Connolly attempts to summarize Asad's theoretical contributions on secularism as follows:

1. Secularism is not merely the division between public and private realms that allows religious diversity to flourish in the latter. It can itself be a carrier of harsh exclusions. And it secretes a new definition of "religion" that conceals some of its most problematic practices from itself.
2. In creating its characteristic division between secular public space and religious private space, European secularism sought to interchange ritual and discipline into the private realm. In doing so, however, it loses touch with how embodied practices of conduct help to constitute culture, including European culture.
3. The constitution of modern Europe, as a continent and a secular civilization, makes it incumbent to treat Muslims in its midst on the one hand as abstract citizens and on the other as a distinctive minority to be either tolerated (the liberal orientation) or restricted (the national orientation), depending on the politics of the day.
4. European, modern, secular constitutions of Islam, in cumulative effect, converge upon a series of simple contrasts between themselves and Islamic practices. These terms of contrast falsify the deep grammar of European secularism and contribute to the culture wars that some bearers of these very definitions seek to ameliorate.

== Notable works ==
=== Genealogies of Religion ===
Genealogies of Religion was published in 1993. The intention of this book is to critically examine the cultural hegemony of the West, exploring how Western concepts and religious practices have shaped the way history is written. The book deals with a variety of historical topics ranging from medieval European rites to the sermons of contemporary Arab theologians. What links them all together, according to Asad, is the assumption that Western history has the greatest importance in the modern world and that explorations of Western history should be the main concern of historians and anthropologists.

The book begins by sketching the emergence of religion as a modern historical object in the first two chapters. Following this, Asad discusses two elements of medieval Christianity that are no longer generally accepted by modern religion, those being the productive role of physical pain and the virtue of self-abasement. While he is not arguing for these practices, he is encouraging readers to think critically about how and why modernism and secular morality position these as archaic “uncivilized” conditions. Asad then addresses aspects of “asymmetry” between western and non-western histories, the largest of these being the fact that Western history is considered the “norm” in that non-Westerners feel the need to study Western history, but this does not go both ways. These “asymmetrical desires and indifferences”, Asad argues, have historically constructed opposition between West and non-West. The final two chapters of the books were written at the height of the Rushdie affair in the late 1980s and address angry responses to religious intolerance in the name of liberalism.

=== Formations of the Secular ===
Asad published Formations of the Secular in 2003. The central idea of the book is creating anthropology of the secular and what that would entail. This is done through first defining and deconstructing secularism and some of its various parts. Asad’s definition posits “secular” as an epistemic category, whereas “secularism” refers to a political doctrine. The intention of this definition is to urge the reader to understand secular and secularism as more than the absence of religiosity, but rather a mode of society that has its own forms of cultural mediation. Secularism, as theorized by Asad, is also deeply rooted in narratives of modernity and progress that formed out of the European Enlightenment, meaning that it is not as “tolerant” and “neutral” as it is widely considered to be. On this, Asad writes “A secular state does not guarantee toleration; it puts into play different structures of ambition and fear. The law never seeks to eliminate violence since its object is always to regulate violence.”

After giving a short genealogy of the concept of “the secular”, Asad discusses agency, pain, and cruelty, how they relate to embodiment, and how they are conceptualized in secular society. From here, he goes into an exploration of different ways in which “the human” or the individual is conceptualized and how this informs different understandings of human rights - establishing “human rights” as having a subjective definition rather than being an objective set of rules. Later chapters explore notions and assumptions around “religious minorities” in Europe, and a discussion of whether nationalism is essentially secular or religious in nature. The final few chapters explore transformations in religious authority, law, and ethics in colonial Egypt in order to illuminate aspects of secularization not usually attended to.

The concluding thought of Formations of the Secular is the question of what anthropology can contribute to the clarification of questions about secularism. Asad does not determine a clear answer to this question, but encourages exploring secularism “through its shadows” and advises that anthropology of secularism should start asking how “different sensibilities, attitudes, assumptions, and behaviors come together to either support or undermine the doctrine of secularism?”

=== On Suicide Bombing ===
In response to the September 11 attacks and the rise in anti-Islamic sentiment that followed, Asad published On Suicide Bombing in 2007. This book is intended to confront questions about political violence that are central to our modern society and to deconstruct western notions of Islamic terrorism. The central question of the book is not to ask why someone would become a suicide bomber, but instead to think critically about why suicide bombing generates such horror.

Asad offers several suggestions or potential explanations as to why there is a particular sense of horror when confronted with suicide bombing:

- Suicide bombing represents the epitome of sudden disorder, creating a shocking, very public upsetting of public life. It is a direct violation of the notion of civilian innocence - which, as Asad points out, also happens as a result of U.S. state violence but is “softened” through patriotic rhetoric. This violation is seen as particularly horrifying and unforgivable.
- Suicide bombing is an act of murder that removes the perpetrator beyond the reach of justice. Modern, liberal society places a strong emphasis on bringing criminals to justice, which is not an option in cases of suicide attacks. Crime and punishment become impossible to separate, meaning there is no way to achieve closure for the attack.
- Asad describes in this book the way that modern society is held together by a series of tensions, such as the tension between individual self-determination and collective obedience to the law, between reverence for human life and its justified ending, and between the promise of immortality through political community and the inexorability of death and decay in individual life. These tensions allow the state to act as sovereign representative, guardian, and nurturer of the social body, but this starts to collapse when the state fails to protect the social body from a suicide attack.
- A suicide bombing forces witnesses to confront death and the thought that “the meaning of life is only death and that death itself has no meaning.” When there is nothing to understand about death, no way to redeem it through a comforting story, the death feels particularly tragic and horrifying.

Asad’s hope in writing this book is not to defend suicide bombing, but instead to go beyond some of the commonly held positions surrounding it. In particular, he is critical of the denunciation of religious violence as the very opposite of legitimate, "justified" political violence that the U.S. engages in. His goal is to communicate that if there is no such thing as "justified terrorism", there is no such thing as "justified war" and therefore to turn the readers' attention to a critical examination of killing, of dying, and of letting live and letting die in modern global politics.

== Publications ==
=== Books ===
- The Kababish Arabs: Power, Authority, and Consent in a Nomadic Tribe (1970).
- Genealogies of Religion: Discipline and Reasons of Power in Christianity and Islam (1993) ISBN 0-8018-9593-6.
- Formations of the Secular: Christianity, Islam, Modernity (2003) ISBN 0804747679.
- On Suicide Bombing (2007) ISBN 9780231511971.
- Is critique secular?: blasphemy, injury, and free speech (with Wendy Brown, Judith Butler and Saba Mahmood) (2013) ISBN 0-8232-5286-8.
- Secular Translations. Nation-State, Modern Self, and Calculative Reason (2018) ISBN 9780231548595.
- Tradition critique. Après la rencontre coloniale (2023).

=== Book chapters ===
- Anthropology and the Colonial Encounter. In Gerrit Huizer and Bruce Mannheim (eds.), The Politics of Anthropology From Colonialism and Sexism Toward a View from Below (1979).
- Comments on Conversion. In Peter van der Veer (ed.), Conversion to Modernities (1996).
- Where Are the Margins of the State?. In Veena Das and Deborah Poole (eds.), Anthropology in the Margins of the State (2007).
- Thinking about religion, belief, and politics. In Robert A. Orsi (ed.), The Cambridge Companion to Religious Studies (2011).
- Two European Images of Non-European Rule. In Saul Dubow (ed.), The Rise and Fall of Modern Empires. Volume II: Colonial Knowledges (2013).

== See also ==
- Aziz al-Azmeh
- William T. Cavanaugh
- Alasdair MacIntyre
- Saba Mahmood
- Charles Taylor (philosopher)

=== Works cited ===
- Anjum, Ovamir (2018). "Interview with Talal Asad". American Journal of Islam and Society. 35 (1): 55–90. doi:10.35632/ajis.v35i1.812.
- Asad, Talal (1968). The Kababish (PhD). University of Oxford. OCLC 46544933.
- Asad, Talal. 1993. “Introduction” in Genealogies of Religion: Discipline and Reasons of Power in Christianity and Islam. 1-24. Baltimore: Johns Hopkins University Press.
- Asad, Talal. 2003. “Introduction: Thinking about Secularism” in Formations of the Secular: Christianity, Islam, Modernity. 1-17. Stanford: Stanford University Press.
- Asad, Talal (2007). "On Suicide Bombing". The Arab Studies Journal. 15/16 (2/1): 123–130. JSTOR 27934028.
- Chaghatai, M. Ikram. "Muhammad Asad – the first citizen of Pakistan". Iqbal Academy Pakistan.
- Connolly, William E. (2005). Pluralism. Durham, North Carolina: Duke University Press. ISBN 9780822335672.
- Eilts, John. 2006. "Talal Asad". Stanford Presidential Lectures in the Humanities and Arts. Accessed 7 May 2020.
- Jakobsen, Jonas (2015). "8 Contextualising Religious Pain: Saba Mahmood, Axel Honneth, and the Danish Cartoons.". Recognition and Freedom. Brill. pp. 169–192.
- Kessler, Gary E. (2012). Fifty Key Thinkers on Religion. Abingdon, England: Routledge. ISBN 978-0-203-80747-7.
- Konopinski, Natalie (13 November 2020). "Tanya Asad". Anthropology News.
- Landry, Jean-Michel (2016). "Les territoires de Talal Asad : Pouvoir, sécularité, modernité". L'Homme (in French). p. 77. ISSN 0439-4216.
- Mirsepassi, Ali (2010). Political Islam, Iran, and the Enlightenment: Philosophies of Hope and Despair. Cambridge University Press. ISBN 9780521745901.
- Mozumder, Mohammad Golam Nabi (2011). Interrogating Post-Secularism: Jürgen Habermas, Charles Taylor, and Talal Asad (MA thesis). Pittsburgh, Pennsylvania: University of Pittsburgh.
- Uğurlu, Ali M., 2017. ”Is There a Secular Tradition? On Treason, Government, and Truth.” (Thesis) City University of New York Academic Works.
- Watson, Janell (November 2011). "Modernizing Middle Eastern Studies, Historicizing Religion, Particularizing Human Rights". The Minnesota Review. 2011 (77): 87–100. doi:10.1215/00265667-1422589. S2CID 153512468.
