= Kristi Andersen =

American political scientist

- Education: Smith College; University of Chicago
- Awards: Victoria Schuck Award, APSA; E. E. Schattschneider Award, APSA
- Scientific career
- Fields: Political science
- Workplaces: NORC at the University of Chicago; Ohio State University; Syracuse University

Kristi Andersen is an American political scientist. She is a professor emerita at Syracuse University, and a senior research associate at the Campbell Public Affairs Institute in the Maxwell School of Syracuse University. She studies party system realignment in the United States, women and politics in American political history, and the incorporation of immigrants into American politics. Andersen also serves as an elected member of the Town Board in Cazenovia, New York.

== Early work and education ==
Andersen grew up in Nebraska. As an undergraduate, she attended Smith College, graduating with a BA in 1969. She then attended the University of Chicago, receiving an MA in 1973 and a PhD in 1976. Her PhD dissertation, How Realignments Happen: Mobilization and the Creation of a Democratic Majority, 1928-1936, received the 1977 American Political Science Association's E. E. Schattschneider Award for "the best doctoral dissertation in the field of American government" that year.

From 1973 to 1975, Andersen was associate study director at the National Opinion Research Center at the University of Chicago. She then joined the political science faculty at Ohio State University, where from 1981 to 1984 she was also the director of the Polimetrics Laboratory. In 1984, she moved to the political science department at Syracuse University.

== Career ==
Andersen has written three books: New Immigrant Communities: Finding a Place in Local Politics (2010), After Suffrage: Women in Partisan and Electoral Politics Before the New Deal (1996), and The Creation of a Democratic Majority, 1928-1936 (1979). Her first book, The Creation of a Democratic Majority, presented evidence that party realignments in the United States, like the creation of the New Deal coalition, can be the result of mobilizing non-voters to turn out to vote rather than frequent voters switching parties. William Schneider particularly praised the book's quantitative methodology, writing that the book "should be required reading in all introductory quantitative methods courses in order to convince skeptical students that real knowledge can be gained through careful quantitative work."

Andersen's second book, After Suffrage: Women in Partisan and Electoral Politics Before the New Deal, was published in 1996. The book contradicts the conventional wisdom that Women's suffrage in the United States had a surprisingly small impact on women and citizenship, and that the activist networks that led to suffrage collapsed soon after it. After suffrage earned Andersen the 1997 Victoria Schuck Award from the American Political Science Association, which honors the best book published on the topic of women and politics each year.

Andersen published her third book, New Immigrant Communities: Finding a Place in Local Politics, in 2010. The book studies the incorporation of immigrants into the American political system by focusing on the acquisition of political power by immigrants to the small American cities of Chico, Spokane, Waco, East Lansing, Syracuse, and Fort Collins.

Andersen has held several named professorships at Syracuse University. In 1999, she was named Maxwell Professor of Teaching Excellence. Later, she was a Laura J. and L. Douglas Meredith Professor for Teaching Excellence from 2002 to 2005. The professorship was granted to facilitate the development of a handbook of teaching quality indicators for use in evaluating faculty members' teaching. In 2010, she became the Chapple Family Professor of Citizenship and Democracy, which is an endowed professorship.

Andersen was elected to the Cazenovia Town Board in 2005, and was re-elected in 3 times.

== Selected works ==
- The Creation of a Democratic Majority, 1928-1936 (1979)
- After Suffrage: Women in Partisan and Electoral Politics Before the New Deal (1996)
- New Immigrant Communities: Finding a Place in Local Politics (2010)

== Selected awards ==
- E. E. Schattschneider Award, American Political Science Association
- Victoria Schuck Award, American Political Science Association
