= Anne Phillips (political theorist) =

British political theorist (born 1950)

Anne Phillips FBA
- Born: 2 June 1950 (age 76); Lancaster, England

Academic background
- Academic advisor: Geoffrey Kay
- Influences: Wendy Brown; Carole Pateman; Iris Marion Young

Academic work
- Discipline: Political science; gender studies
- Sub-discipline: Political theory
- School or tradition: Feminism
- Institutions: London School of Economics
- Notable works: Multiculturalism Without Culture (2007)

Anne Phillips FBA (born 2 June 1950) is Emeritus Professor of Political Theory at the London School of Economics (LSE), where she was previously Graham Wallas Professor of Political Science. She was elected a Fellow of the British Academy in 2003.

== Profile ==
Anne Phillips joined the LSE in 1999 as Professor of Gender Theory, and was Director of the Gender Institute until September 2004. She subsequently was appointed to both the Gender Institute and Government Department before moving to Government. Her field is feminist political theory; she writes on issues of democracy and representation, equality, multiculturalism, and difference. Much of her work can be read as challenging the narrowness of contemporary liberal theory.

In 1992, she was co-winner of the American Political Science Association's Victoria Schuck Award for Best Book on Women and Politics published in 1991 (awarded for Engendering Democracy). She was awarded an honorary doctorate from Aalborg University in 1999; was appointed adjunct professor in the political science programme of the Research School of Social Sciences, Australian National University, 2002–6.

== Research projects ==
In 2002–4, she carried out a Nuffield funded research project on tensions between sexual and cultural equality in the British courts.

She later worked with Sawitri Saharso, Vrije Universiteit (Free University), Amsterdam, on a cross European collaboration (also funded by Nuffield) that has explored issues of gender and culture in their specifically European context. This involved two conferences, one in London in 2005 and the other in Amsterdam in 2006, and led to a special issue of the journal Ethnicities (2008).

== Published works ==
=== Books ===
- Phillips, Anne (1995). The politics of presence. Oxford New York: Clarendon Press Oxford University Press. ISBN 9780198294153. Second edition 1998.

Swedish translation Narvarons Politik Studentlitteratur, 2000.
Italian translation of Chapter 2 published in Info/Quaderni VI, n. 7-9, 18 December 2000

- Phillips, Anne (1999). Which equalities matter. Cambridge, UK Malden, Massachusetts: Polity Press Blackwell Publishers. ISBN 9780745621098.
- Phillips, Anne; Bonnie, Honig; Dryzek, John S. (2008). The Oxford handbook of political theory. Oxford: Oxford University Press. ISBN 9780199548439.
- Phillips, Anne (2007). Multiculturalism without culture. Princeton, New Jersey: Princeton University Press. ISBN 9780691141152.; see Multiculturalism without culture
- Phillips, Anne (2013). Our bodies, whose property. Princeton: Princeton University Press. ISBN 9780691150864.
- Phillips, Anne (2015). The Politics of the Human. Cambridge: Cambridge University Press. ISBN 9781316145555.
- Phillips, Anne (2021). Unconditional Equals. Cambridge, Cambridge University Press.

=== Journal articles ===
- Phillips, Anne (July 2003). "When gender means culture: issues of cultural defence in the English courts". Modern Law Review. 66 (4): 510–531. doi:10.1111/1468-2230.6604002. S2CID 56263527.
- Phillips, Anne (March 2004). "Defending equality of outcome". Journal of Political Philosophy. 12 (1): 1–19. doi:10.1111/j.1467-9760.2004.00188.x.
- Phillips, Anne; Dustin, Moira (October 2004). "UK initiatives on forced marriage: regulation, dialogue and exit". Political Studies. 52 (3): 531–551. doi:10.1111/j.1467-9248.2004.00494.x. S2CID 146499526.
- Phillips, Anne (June 2005). "Between norms and practicalities: a response to Sawitri Saharso" (PDF). Ethnicities. 5 (2): 271–274. doi:10.1177/146879680500500207. S2CID 144192246.
- Phillips, Anne (March 2006). ""Really" equal: opportunities and autonomy". Journal of Political Philosophy. 14 (1): 18–32. doi:10.1111/j.1467-9760.2006.00241.x.

=== Other publications ===
- Feminism and Politics, collection of readings with introduction. Oxford Readings in Feminism, series editors Teresa Brennan and Susan James, Oxford University Press, 1998, pp. 471.
- Democracy and Difference, Polity Press and Pennsylvania State University Press, 1993, pp. 175.
- Destabilising Theory: Contemporary Feminist Debates, co-edited with Michele Barrett, Polity Press and Stanford University Press, 1992, pp. 224. Second English edition, 1998; Mexican edition, 1999.
- Engendering Democracy, Polity Press and Pennsylvania State University Press, 1991, pp. 183. (Co-winner of American Political Science Association's Victoria Schuck Award for Best Book on Women and Politics published in 1991).
  - Spanish edition, 1994; German edition 1995; Turkish edition, 1995; Mexican edition, 1996; second English edition, 1997; Croatian edition 2000; Slovenian edition, 2002.
- The Enigma of Colonialism: British Policy in West Africa, Indiana University Press and James Currey, 1989, pp. 184.
- Divided Loyalties: Dilemmas of Sex and Class, Virago Press, 1987, pp. 192.
- Feminism and Equality (edited readings with an introductory essay), Blackwell Publishing and New York University Press, 1987, pp. 202.
- Hidden Hands: Women and Economic Policies, Pluto Press, 1983, pp. 116.

Awards
Preceded by Jane Sherron De Hart	Victoria Schuck Award; 1992; With: Nancie Caraway	Succeeded by Virginia Sapiro
Preceded by Donald G. Mathews	Victoria Schuck Award; 1992; With: Nancie Caraway	Succeeded by Virginia Sapiro
Preceded by Iris Marion Young	Victoria Schuck Award; 1992; With: Nancie Caraway	Succeeded by Virginia Sapiro
