= Barbara J. Nelson =

American political scientist

- Education: Ohio State University; University of Michigan; University of Strathclyde
- Awards: Victoria Schuck Award; Harry Scoville Award
- Scientific career
- Fields: Political science; Public policy
- Institutions: Princeton School of Public and International Affairs; Humphrey School of Public Affairs; Radcliffe College; UCLA Luskin School of Public Affairs

Barbara J. Nelson is an American political scientist and public policy scholar. She is Professor Emerita in the Public Policy Department of the UCLA Luskin School of Public Affairs, where she is also Dean Emerita. She specializes in social policy topics and in the study of strategic multi-stakeholder decision-making.

== Life and career ==
Nelson attended Ohio State University, where she earned a B.A. degree in 1971, an M.A. in 1975, and a PhD in 1976, all in political science. Nelson was elected to the Pi Sigma Alpha political science honor society. She also studied at the University of Michigan and the University of Strathclyde.

In 1976, Nelson joined the faculty of the Princeton School of Public and International Affairs. In 1983, she moved to the Humphrey School of Public Affairs, where from 1984 to 1994 she was the Director of the Center on Women and Public Policy. Nelson then moved to Radcliffe College, where for two years she served as vice president and Distinguished Professor of Public Policy, and was the chief academic officer of the college. In 1996 Nelson became a professor of public policy at the UCLA School of Public Affairs, where she served as Dean from 1996 until 2008.

== Research ==
In 1984, Nelson published the book Making an issue of child abuse: Political agenda setting for social problems. In Making an issue of child abuse, Nelson studied the emergence of child abuse as a public policy issue in the United States, as it became a matter of public debate culminating in the passage of legislation through Congress like the Child Abuse Prevention and Treatment Act. Nelson describes the development of child abuse as a social welfare issue from the 1874 creation of the New York Society for the Prevention of Cruelty to Children to the 1970s, using agenda-setting theory to understand how the issue was elevated by the media, state and local governments, and the United States Children's Bureau. Also in 1984, she published Women in Politics: A Selected Bibliography and Resource Guide, a reference guide of more than 1600 citations to documents relevant to the study of American women and politics.

In 1989, Nelson coauthored Wage justice: Comparable worth and the paradox of technocratic reform with Sara M. Evans. The book focused on the implementation strategy of equal pay for equal work, which often relied on the idea of "comparable worth" to determine whether or not wage discrimination was occurring in a given area; Nelson and Evans argue that this policy paradoxically produces gains for working women while also increasing the power of technocratic evaluators who are tasked with judging comparable worth. Wage justice won the Policy Studies Award for the best book in the field of Public Policy from the Policy Studies Organization. In 1994, she co-edited Women and Politics Worldwide with Najma Chowdhury. In 2003 Nelson published The Concord handbook: How to build social capital across communities with Linda Kaboolian and Kathryn A. Carver, and in 2004 she published Leadership and diversity: A teacher's guide and Leadership and diversity: A case handbook.

Nelson won the 1995 Victoria Schuck Award from the American Political Science Association. In 2004, Nelson won the Harry Scoville Award for academic and leadership accomplishments from the Los Angeles Chapter of the American Society for Public Administration.

== Selected works ==
- American women and politics : a selected bibliography and resource guide. Garland Pub. 1984. ISBN 0824091396.
- Making an issue of child abuse: Political agenda setting for social problems (1984)
- Evans, Sara M.; Nelson (1989). Wage justice: Comparable worth and the paradox of technocratic reform. The University of Chicago Press. ISBN 9780226222608.
- The Concord handbook: How to build social capital across communities, with Linda Kaboolian and Kathryn A. Carver (2003)
- Leadership and diversity: A teacher's guide (2004)
- Leadership and diversity: A case handbook (2004)

== Selected awards ==
- Victoria Schuck Award, American Political Science Association (1995)
- Harry Scoville Award, American Society for Public Administration (2004)
