= Frances McCall Rosenbluth =

American political scientist

- Born: October 22, 1958
- Died: November 20, 2021 (aged 63)
- Education: University of Virginia; Columbia University
- Awards: Fellow, AAAS; Guggenheim Fellow; Victoria Schuck Award, APSA
- Scientific career
- Fields: Political science; Political economy
- Workplaces: Waseda University; University of Virginia; University of California, San Diego; University of California, Los Angeles; Yale University
- Doctoral students: Fan Yun

Frances McCall Rosenbluth (1958 – 2021) was an American political scientist. She was the Damon Wells Professor of Political Science at Yale University. She was a comparative political economist, specializing in the political economy of Japan, the role of gender in political economy, inequality, and party politics. She had previously served as the deputy provost of Yale University, while being an executive board member at Waseda University in Tokyo, Japan. She was also the Vice-President of International Affairs (U.S.) at Waseda's School of Political Science and Economics.

== Education and early career ==
McCall was born in Osaka, Japan in 1958. She graduated from the University of Virginia with a B.A. in government and foreign affairs in 1980. She then attended graduate school at Columbia University, receiving a graduate certificate from the East Asian Institute there in 1982, an M.A. from the school of international and public affairs in 1983, and a Ph.D. in political science in 1988.

For the 1988—1989 academic year, Rosenbluth joined the faculty at the University of Virginia. She then moved to the University of California, San Diego, and then in 1992 became a professor at the University of California, Los Angeles. In 1994, she moved to Yale University and remained as faculty in the department of political science. In 2018, she joined Waseda University as an external executive board member, contributing greatly to the transformation of the institution under president Aiji Tanaka's administration.

== Career ==
In addition to her many peer-reviewed journal articles, Rosenbluth has been the author or co-author of 6 books, and the editor of several more. She was the sole author of her first book, Financial Politics in Contemporary Japan, which was published in 1989. The book examines how Japan regulated a major financial industry, including several of the world's largest banks and securities companies. Stephen J. Anderson called Financial Politics in Contemporary Japan "pioneering", writing that "Rosenbluth gives elegant insights into how politics matters in Japanese finance".

Rosenbluth's article "Bones of Contention: The Political Economy of Height Inequality", published with Carles Boix in the American Political Science Review, was awarded the 2015 Heinz I. Eulau Award for the best article published in that journal each year. The award committee called their paper "innovative and path-breaking in the extreme", since Rosenbluth and Boix were able to extend data far back beyond World War II to study the origins of inequality. Rosenbluth was also a recipient of the 2011 Victoria Schuck Award from the American Political Science Association, which honors the best book published on the topic of women and politics, in recognition for her book Women, Work & Politics: The Political Economy of Gender Inequality co-authored with Torben Iversen. Her final book was Responsible Parties: Saving Democracy From Itself, co-authored with her longtime partner Ian Shapiro.

Rosenbluth has received several other major academic honors. In 2007, she was appointed as a member of the American Academy of Arts and Sciences. Rosenbluth was also a 2010 winner of the Guggenheim Fellowship from the John Simon Guggenheim Memorial Foundation.

Rosenbluth's work has been frequently cited or reviewed in media outlets like the New York Times, The New Yorker, and The Wall Street Journal.

== Selected works ==
- Financial Politics in Contemporary Japan (1989)
- Women, Work & Politics: The Political Economy of Gender Inequality, with Torben Iversen (2010)
- "Bones of Contention: The Political Economy of Height Inequality", American Political Science Review, with Carles Boix (2014)
- Responsible Parties: Saving Democracy From Itself, with Ian Shapiro (2018)

== Selected awards ==
- American Academy of Arts and Sciences Fellow (2007)
- Guggenheim Fellow (2010)
- Victoria Shuck Award, American Political Science Association (2011)
