= Judith A. Baer =

American political scientist

- Awards: Victoria Schuck Award
- Scientific career
- Fields: Political science; Public law; Feminist jurisprudence
- Workplaces: University at Albany, SUNY; California State Polytechnic University, Pomona; Texas A&M University

Judith A. Baer is an American political scientist. She is a professor of political science at Texas A&M University. Her research focuses on public law and feminist jurisprudence.

== Life and career ==
Baer has been a professor at the University at Albany, SUNY, the California State Polytechnic University, Pomona, and Texas A&M University.

In Baer's 1978 book, The chains of protection: The judicial response to women's labor legislation, she explored the implications of and political response to the United States Supreme Court's decision in the 1908 case Muller v. Oregon to limit the working hours of women in a way that had no parallel for men.

She argues that a law which appeared to provide women with less exploitative working conditions was ironically upheld by the court for the wrong reasons, with the justification that women needed extra protections because of their inherent vulnerabilities rather than because they were put at extra risk by material conditions. Baer studies decades of subsequent legislation pertaining to the equality of women, and analyzes the competing perspectives on whether or not it has been helpful to women's rights to extend legal protections to women that are not extended to men, which is often done with the aim of reducing disparities that have advantaged men. She analyzed the historical legal status of women in the United States in her 1991 book Women in American law: The struggle toward equality from the New Deal to the present. In Women in American law, she studied the legal improvements and setbacks in American women's rights from 1933 through the late 1980s.

In 1999, Baer published the book Our lives before the law: Constructing a feminist jurisprudence. This book is an attempt to develop a theory of feminist jurisprudence that would secure both equal rights and equal responsibilities for women and men, in contrast to jurisprudence that secures and supports men's dominance over women. Baer argues that much judicial reasoning which treats men and women differently has focused on differences between men and women that are assumed to be physiological and innate, whereas both the American legal system is both a cause and an effect of men's disproportionate power. Baer suggests a number of approaches to reduce legal gender bias, including shifting notions of personal responsibility away from their disproportionate burden on women and more onto the law and onto men, in order to address legal disparities like burdens of care that affect women's lives.

For Our lives before the law, Baer won the Victoria Schuck Award in 2000 for the best book on women and politics.

In 2013, Baer wrote Ironic freedom: personal choice, public policy, and the paradox of reform. In Ironic freedom, Baer examines a series of potential legal ironies largely occasioned by progressive legal advances that may actually produce regressive results; for example, a volunteer-only army may be largely populated by impoverished people who have less actual choice about whether or not to join the military, and the legalization of same-sex marriage may result in people being materially compelled to marry in certain situations. Baer also coauthored the undergraduate textbook The constitutional and legal rights of women: cases in law and social change with Leslie Goldstein.

== Selected works ==
- 'The chains of protection: The judicial response to women's labor legislation' (1978)
- 'Women in American law: The struggle toward equality from the New Deal to the present' (1991)
- 'Our lives before the law: Constructing a feminist jurisprudence' (1999)
- 'The constitutional and legal rights of women : cases in law and social change', co authored with Leslie Goldstein (2006)
- 'Ironic freedom: Personal choice, public policy, and the Paradox of Reform' (2013)

== Selected awards ==
- Victoria Schuck Award (2000)

== Other works ==
- Equality under the Constitution: Reclaiming the Fourteenth Amendment (1983)
- Historical and Multicultural Encyclopedia of Women's Reproductive Rights in the United States (2002)
- Feminist Post-Liberalism (2020)
