= Bibliography of Nigerian women =

Bibliography

A Bibliography of books about Nigerian women and studies:

== A ==
- Abdu, Hussaini (2001). Women and politics in Nigeria: agenda for political participation. Women in Nigeria, Kaduna Chapter. ISBN 978-978-135-802-9.
- Achebe, Nwando (2011). The Female King of Colonial Nigeria: Ahebi Ugbabe. Indiana University Press. ISBN 0-253-22248-6.
- Adeyokunnu, Tomilayo O.; Women, African Training and Research Centre for (1981). Women and agriculture in Nigeria. United Nations Economic Commission for Africa.
- Afolabi, Abiola Akiyode (2003). Shari'a implementation in Nigeria: issues & challenges on women's rights and access to justice. Women's Aid Collective (WACOL). ISBN 978-978-36242-4-5.
- Akande, Jadesola Olayinka Debo (1990). The Contribution of women to national development in Nigeria. Nigerian Association of University Women. ISBN 978-978-30650-0-0.
- Azikiwe, Uche (1996). Women in Nigeria: an annotated bibliography. Greenwood Press. ISBN 978-0-313-29960-5.

== C ==
- Chuku, Gloria (22 December 2015). Igbo Women and Economic Transformation in Southeastern Nigeria, 1900-1960. Routledge. ISBN 978-1-135-46940-5.

== E ==
- Emerole, S. M. (1991). A New Era for the Rural Women of Nigeria. SUM-CRC Media Services.

== G ==
- Giwa, Nimota Goroso (1990). Nigerian women in the year 2000 AD. Omoniya Ayeni Press.

== H ==
- Hodges, Tony (2001). Children's and women's rights in Nigeria: a wake-up call : situation assessment and analysis, 2001. National Planning Commission.

== I ==
- Ibe, Peter O. Nwankwo & Patrick I. (26 July 2013). CRITICAL ANALYSIS OF WOMEN CONDITIONS IN NIGERIA: VIOLENCE, DISCRIMINATION, AND OTHER MALTREATMENTS. Trafford Publishing. ISBN 978-1-4907-0783-9.

== J ==
- Johnson-Odim, Cheryl; Mba, Nina Emma (1997). For Women and the Nation: Funmilayo Ransome-Kuti of Nigeria. University of Illinois Press. ISBN 978-0-252-06613-9.

== M ==
- Matera, M.; Bastian, M.; Kent, S. Kingsley (27 October 2011). The Women's War of 1929: Gender and Violence in Colonial Nigeria. Palgrave Macmillan UK. ISBN 978-0-230-35606-1.

== N ==
- Nwagwu, Helen Onyemazuwa; Moronkola, Olawale A.; Akintunde, Dorcas Olu (2009). Women issues in Nigeria. Royal People, Nigeria. ISBN 978-978-36668-9-4.

== O ==
- Odejide, Abiola (1996). Women and the media in Nigeria. Women's Research and Documentation Centre.
- Ojewusi, Sola (1996). Speaking for Nigerian women: (a history of the National Council of Women's Societies, Nigeria). All State Publishing and Printing Co. ISBN 978-978-32382-0-6.
- Okeke-Ihejirika, Philomina Ezeagbor (2004). Negotiating Power and Privilege: Igbo Career Women in Contemporary Nigeria. Ohio University Press. ISBN 978-0-89680-241-4.
- Omoruyi, Omo (1992). Women and politics in Nigeria. Malthouse Press for Centre for Democratic Studies. ISBN 978-978-31703-5-3.
- Onolemhemhen, Durrenda Nash (2005). A Social Worker's Investigation of Childbirth Injured Women in Northern Nigeria. University Press of America. ISBN 978-0-7618-3083-2.

== R ==
- Robson, Elsbeth (1993). Women in Nigeria: The First Ten Years. Women in Nigeria.

== S ==
- Sanders, Robin Renee (11 November 2013). The Legendary Uli Women of Nigeria: Their Life Stories in Signs, Symbols, and Motifs. Xlibris Corporation. ISBN 978-1-4836-7923-5.
- Sesay, Amadu; Odebiyi, Adetanwa (1998). Nigerian women in society and development. Dokun Publishing. ISBN 978-978-32878-8-4.

== T ==
- Togunde, Rasheed Oladimeji (1995). The effects of female employment on fertility in urban Nigeria. Cornell University.
- Toyo, Nkoyo (1999). Gender and Political Participation of Women in Nigeria: Which Way?. Justice, Development and Peace Commission, Ijebu-Ode Catholic Diocese.

== Anon ==
- Female Circumcision/female Genital Cutting in Nigeria: Couples' Attitudes, Women's Empowerment, and Acute Obstetric Outcomes. ProQuest. 2009. ISBN 978-1-109-13241-0.
- Women in Nigeria Today. Zed. 1985. ISBN 978-0-86232-447-6.

== See also ==
- Bibliography of African women
