= Aili M. Tripp =

American political scientist

Aili Mari Tripp
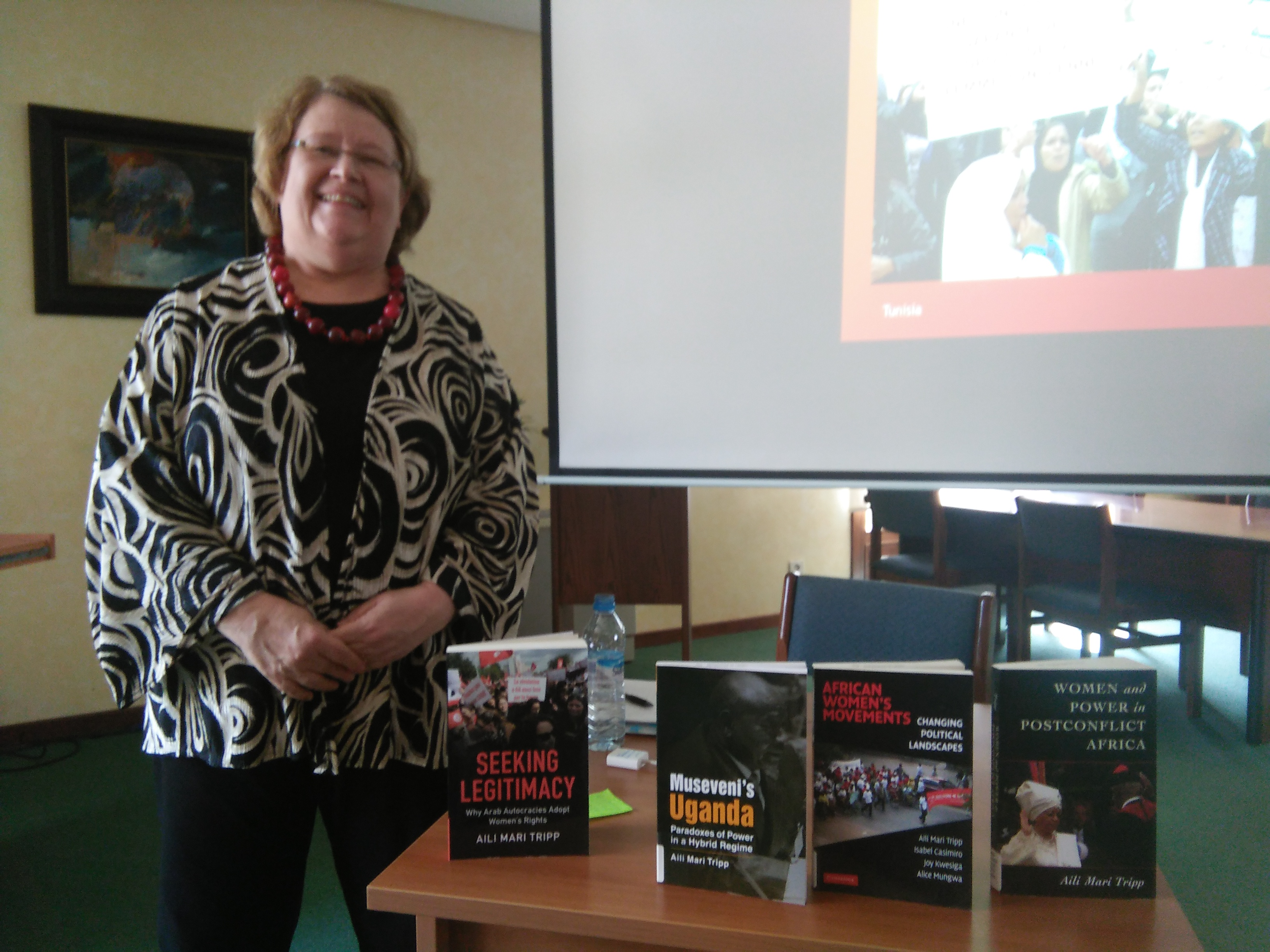
- Tripp in 2019
- Born: 24 May 1958 (age 68)
- Education: Northwestern University; University of Chicago
- Scientific career
- Fields: Political science
- Workplaces: University of Wisconsin-Madison; John D. and Catherine T. MacArthur Foundation

Aili Mari Tripp (born 24 May 1958) is a Finnish and American political scientist, currently the Wangari Maathai Professor of Political Science and Gender and Women's Studies at the University of Wisconsin-Madison.

== Education and early career ==
Tripp is a dual Finnish-U.S. citizen. She was born in the United Kingdom to a Finnish mother and American father, and spent fifteen years of her childhood in Tanzania. In 1983, she graduated with a B.A. in political science from the University of Chicago, earning an MA in Middle East studies form the same institution in 1985. She then received a PhD in political science from Northwestern University in 1990. From 1989 to 1991, Tripp was a research associate with the John D. and Catherine T. MacArthur Foundation from 1989 to 1991.

== Career ==
Tripp has published six books. Her first, Changing the Rules: The Politics of Liberalization and the Urban Informal Economy in Tanzania, was published in 1997, and was based on her PhD dissertation at Northwestern University. Her subsequent books have won several awards. Her second book, published in 2000 and entitled Women and Politics in Uganda, won the 2001 Victoria Schuck Award of the American Political Science Association for the best book in women and politics, as well as a Choice Reviews Outstanding Academic Title Award. Tripp's 2015 book Women and Politics in Postconflict Africa won the Best Book in African Politics award from the African Politics Conference Group, and was a finalist or runner-up for multiple awards from the African Studies Association.

Tripp has held several professional and service positions for major research organisations and journals. After serving as president of the African Studies Association in 2011-2012, Tripp won the 2014 African Studies Association Public Service Award. She was also the vice-president of the American Political Science Association in 2006. Tripp has received research awards and fellowships from bodies such as the American Academy in Berlin, Fulbright, Woodrow Wilson International Center for Scholars, Social Science Research Council, American Association of University Women, John D. and Catherine T. MacArthur Foundation, and the American Council of Learned Societies.

Tripp is a member of the 2020-2024 editorial leadership of American Political Science Review, which is the most selective political science journal.

== Personal life ==
Tripp has lived in Finland, Tanzania, Uganda, United Kingdom, Germany, United States, and Morocco.

== Books ==
- Changing the Rules: The Politics of Liberalization and the Urban Informal Economy in Tanzania. Berkeley and Los Angeles: University of California Press. 1997.
- Women and Politics in Uganda. Madison: University of Wisconsin Press. Oxford: James Currey and Kampala: Fountain Publishers. 2000.
- African Women's Movements: Transforming Political Landscapes. with Isabel Casimiro, Joy Kwesiga, and Alice Mungwa. New York: Cambridge University Press. 2009.
- Museveni's Uganda: Paradoxes of Power in a Hybrid Regime. Boulder: Lynne Rienner. 2010.
- Women and Power in Postconflict Africa. New York: Cambridge University Press. 2015.
- Why African Autocracies Promote Women as Leaders. New York: Oxford University Press. 2026.
