= Multiculturalism Without Culture =

2007 book by Anne Phillips

- Author: Anne Phillips
- Language: English
- Subject: Multiculturalism, feminism, political philosophy
- Genre: Non-fiction
- Publisher: Princeton University Press
- Publication date: May 21, 2007
- Publication place: United Kingdom
- Media type: Hardback
- Pages: 216 pp
- ISBN: 978-0-691-12944-0 (hardback)
- Dewey Decimal: 305.4809182/1 22
- LC Class: HQ1161 .P452 2007

Multiculturalism Without Culture is a book written by Anne Phillips. The topic of multiculturalism is explored by Phillips with reference to such subjects as feminism, anthropology, political theory, law, and philosophy. Her inspiration to write the book stemmed from the contrasting concerns of multiculturalism challenging the rights of women and feminism encroaching upon the well-being of cultures. While Phillips presents many different perspectives on multiculturalism, her general argument in the book can be summed up as: “It is time for elaborating a version of multiculturalism that dispenses with reified notions of culture, engages more ruthlessly with cultural stereotypes, and refuses to subordinate the rights and interests of women to the supposed traditions of their culture.”

== Summary ==
In the book, Phillips elaborates on the idea of a multiculturalism without culture. In this model, the conception of culture as unchanging and domineering (A view that Phillips argues is held by many governments and people alike) is disposed in favour of the idea that culture is fluid and that the individual in the culture, not the culture group itself, has rights and is the most important element. A central part of her theory rests on the idea that people in minority cultures have autonomy. Her discussion weighs many different perspectives on multiculturalism provided by an array of modern writers on the subject. She consistently keeps feminist theory as a primary foundation from which she structures her arguments. The book ends with her vouching for the increasing of consultative services for minority groups and increase of dialogue between them and governments.

== Reception ==
Critical reception has been mostly positive. The Polish Sociological Review gave Multiculturalism Without Culture a favorable review, remarking that it was a "stimulating, well-researched and well-written book". Professor Anna Yeatman of the University of Western Sydney posted on H-Net that the book "goes only so far theoretically" but that it was "an excellent and considered argument for multiculturalism at a time when it has come under attack from all quarters."

== See also ==
- Will Kymlicka
- Bhikhu Parekh
- Islamic dress in Europe
