= Mala Htun =

American political scientist (1969–2025)

- Born: August 23, 1969
- Died: January 24, 2025 (aged 55)
- Education: Stanford University; Harvard University
- Awards: Andrew Carnegie Fellow; Best Dissertation on women and politics, APSA
- Scientific career
- Fields: Political science; Latin American studies; Women's and gender studies
- Workplaces: New School for Social Research; Eugene Lang College; University of New Mexico

Mala Nani Htun (August 23, 1969 – January 24, 2025) was an American political scientist. She was a professor of political science at the University of New Mexico. Htun studied comparative politics, particularly women's rights and the politics of race and ethnicity with a focus on Latin America.

== Background ==
Htun was born on August 23, 1969. She studied International Relations at Stanford University, graduating with an AB in 1991. She then studied political science at Harvard University, obtaining an AM in 1996 and a PhD in 2000. Htun's PhD dissertation, Private Lives, Public Policies: Divorce, Abortion, and Family Equality in Latin America, won the Best Dissertation Prize from the Women and Politics section of the American Political Science Association.

Htun died from cancer on January 24, 2025, at the age of 55.

== Career ==
From 2000 until 2011, Htun was a professor of political science at the New School for Social Research and Eugene Lang College. During this time she was also a 2002-2003 Fellow of the Radcliffe Institute for Advanced Study at Harvard University, a 2004 Fellow at the Kellogg Institute for International Studies at the University of Notre Dame, and a Council on Foreign Relations-Hitachi International Affairs Fellow in 2007. In 2011, Htun joined the faculty in the department of political science at the University of New Mexico.

In addition to a number of publications in journals such as The American Political Science Review and the Latin American Research Review, Htun has also written three books: Sex and the State: Abortion, Divorce, and the Family under Latin American Dictatorships and Democracies (2003), Inclusion without Representation: Gender Quotas and Ethnic Reservations in Latin America (2016), and The Logics of Gender Justice: State Action on Women's Rights Around the World (2018).

In a review of Sex and the State, Patricia Hipsher wrote that, by seeking "to answer the question of how and why states make particular policy decisions on gender-related issues", Htun wrote one of the first comparative studies of gender-related public policy reform in Latin America. According to Courtney Jung in a review of Htun's second book, Inclusion without Representation is a study of institutions that "are designed to ensure that members of historically excluded groups are elected to political office" inspired by the work of Arend Lijphart and Merwin Crawford Young.

In 2015, Htun was named an Andrew Carnegie Fellow, for her work to "explore the ways that laws and public policies shape women's economic agency, and how economic empowerment affects gender relations and social norms".

Htun's 2018 book, The Logics of Gender Justice: State Action on Women's Rights Around the World, was coauthored with S. Laurel Weldon. Htun and Weldon studied the evolution of women's rights issues such as family law, abortion, paid parental leave, and contraception from 1975 to 2005. For The Logics of Gender Justice, Htun and Weldon received the Human Rights Best Book Award for 2019 from the International Studies Association.

Htun worked in several capacities on the advancement of traditionally underrepresented groups in political science. She was a Special Advisor for Inclusion and Climate in the School of Engineering at the University of New Mexico, and the deputy director for Advance, a program that aims to promote the success and inclusion of faculty who are white women or minorities. Htun also coordinated inclusion efforts in the American Political Science Association.

Htun's work has been mentioned in media such as The New York Times, The Washington Post, and the Stanford Social Innovation Review.

== Selected works ==
- Sex and the State: Abortion, Divorce, and the Family under Latin American Dictatorships and Democracies (2003)
- Inclusion without Representation: Gender Quotas and Ethnic Reservations in Latin America (2016)
- The Logics of Gender Justice: State Action on Women’s Rights Around the World (2018)

== Selected awards ==
- Best dissertation on women and politics, American Political Science Association (2000)
- Andrew Carnegie Fellowship (2015)
