= S. Laurel Weldon =

Canadian political scientist

- Born: 1967 or 1968 (age 57–58)
- Education: Simon Fraser University; University of British Columbia; University of Pittsburgh
- Awards: Victoria Schuck Award, APSA; Human Rights Best Book Award, ISA
- Scientific career
- Fields: Political science
- Workplaces: Simon Fraser University; Purdue University; University of Pittsburgh
- Doctoral advisor: Iris Marion Young

S. Laurel Weldon FRSC is a Canadian and American political scientist, currently a Distinguished Professor of Political Science at Simon Fraser University. She is a democratic and feminist theorist, known for studies of the cross-national evolution of women's rights, policies on the prevention of violence against women, and the inclusion of women in political decision-making. Weldon's work has been noted for contributing to both substantive political theory and empirical methods.

== Education ==
Weldon's mother, Sirje Weldon, was the Atlantic regional director for the Canadian Bankers Association, and her father, K. Laurence Weldon, was a professor of mathematics and statistics at Simon Fraser University.

Weldon attended Simon Fraser University, graduating in 1991 with a BA in political science and sociology and a minor in philosophy. She then completed an MA in political science at the University of British Columbia in 1992, and a PhD in political science at the University of Pittsburgh in 1999, where she was advised by Iris Marion Young.

== Career ==
After graduating with a PhD from the University of Pittsburgh, Weldon moved to Purdue University in 1999. She soon published the 2002 book Protest, Policy and the Problem of Violence Against Women, as well as a series of widely cited cross-national studies on violence against women and women's political participation.

In 2011, Weldon published the book When Protest Makes Policy: How Social Movements Represent Disadvantaged Groups, which studied the role of social movements in democracy through several case studies on American social movements. This work provided evidence that social movements can be an effective means for systematically disadvantaged groups to promote their collective aims, and that in some cases strong social movements can provide more effective safeguards against negative political outcomes than the official inclusion of group members in formal institutions like legislatures. The book won the American Political Science Association's 2012 Victoria Schuck Award for the best book published on women and politics. In 2013, Weldon was a co-editor of the first Oxford Handbook on Politics and Gender.

Weldon's third book was coauthored with Mala Htun and published in 2018; in The Logics of Gender Justice: State Action on Women’s Rights Around the World, Weldon and Htun studied the evolution of women's rights issues such as family law, abortion, paid parental leave, and contraception from 1975 to 2005. Weldon and Htun received the Human Rights Best Book Award for 2019 from the International Studies Association.

Weldon has been a consultant for international organisations including the United Nations and the World Bank. She has also been a lead reviewer for selective political science journals: she is part of the 2020-2024 editorial leadership of the American Political Science Review, and was a founding co-editor of the Western Political Science Association journal Politics, Groups, and Identities.

Weldon's work has been noted for contributing to diverse subfields, particularly for developing political theory while also contributing new ideas in how to study political phenomena with rigorous empirical methods. In 2018, Weldon moved to Simon Fraser University from Purdue University, where she had been a Distinguished Professor and the Director of the Purdue Policy Research Institution.

In 2020, Weldon was inducted in the Royal Society of Canada.

== Books ==
- Protest, Policy and the Problem of Violence Against Women (2002)
- When Protest Makes Policy: How Social Movements Represent Disadvantaged Groups (2011)
- The Logics of Gender Justice: State Action on Women’s Rights Around the World, with Mala Htun (2018)

== Awards ==
- Victoria Schuck Award, American Political Science Association (2012)
- Human Rights Best Book Award, International Studies Association (2019)
- Fellow, Royal Society of Canada (2020)
