= Susan Franceschet =

Canadian political scientist

- Education: University of Manitoba; Carleton University
- Scientific career
- Fields: Political science
- Workplaces: Acadia University; University of Calgary

Susan Franceschet is a Canadian political scientist. She is a professor of political science and gender studies at The University of Calgary. She studies the representation of women both in legislatures and government cabinets, gender quotas for the minimum representation of women in government, and the interaction of gender and public policy. She has written about women's participation in the politics of Chile.

== Education and positions ==
Franceschet attended the University of Manitoba, where she graduated with a BA degree in history in 1994. She then attended Carleton University, earning an MA in political science in 1997 and a PhD in political science in 2001.

In 2001, Franceschet joined the political science faculty at Acadia University. In 2006, she moved to the department of political science at the University of Calgary. In 2011 she also became a Senior Fellow in the Latin American Research Centre there.

== Research ==
In 2005, Franceschet published the book Women and Politics in Chile. In Women and Politics in Chile, Franceschet studies the obstacles to gender equality in the party politics of Chile, investigating gender divisions in civic participation throughout the rise of the Chilean welfare state and expansion of democracy from 1932 to 1973, the authoritarian regime from 1973 to 1990, and the subsequent reintroduction of democracy. The book addresses a puzzle in Chile's recent political history: despite the very high activity of the feminist movement during the Pinochet regime, and the election around the time of the book's publication of Michelle Bachelet as the first woman to be president of Chile, nevertheless women remain starkly underrepresented in Chile's governing institutions. Franceschet identifies a tension within feminist activist movements in Chile between a pro-autonomy position that emphasizes distance from the state, and a double militancy position of being both a member of the feminist movement and working within the state, and she traces this tension back to the first wave of feminist activism in Chile in the early 20th century. She also studies why Chile does not have gender quotas for women in government. In addition to historical analysis, Franceschet conducted more than 50 interviews with Chilean women.

In 2012, Franceschet co-edited the book The Impact of Gender Quotas with Mona Lena Krook and Jennifer M. Piscopo, and she edited Comparative Public Policy in Latin America with Jordi Díez. In 2018, she co-edited the Palgrave Handbook of Women's Political Rights with Mona Lena Krook and Netina Tan. Franceschet was a coauthor of the 2019 book Cabinets, Ministers, and Gender with Claire Annesley and Karen Beckwith.

Franceschet has been a member of the editorial board of the journals Politics & Gender and Journal of Women, Politics & Policy.

Franceschet has written articles in outlets like The Washington Post and The Conversation. She has also been interviewed, or her work has been cited, in media outlets including The Washington Post, The Toronto Star, L'Express, BBC, The Sydney Morning Herald, and Bloomberg News.

== Selected works ==
- Women and Politics in Chile (2005)
- Cabinets, Ministers, and Gender, with Claire Annesley and Karen Beckwith (2019)
