= Politics & Gender =

- Discipline: Political science, gender studies
- Language: English
- Edited by: Susan Franceschet; Christina Wolbrecht

Publication details
- History: 2005–present
- Publisher: Cambridge Journals for the Women and Politics Research Section of APSA (United States)
- Frequency: Quarterly
- Impact factor: .779 (2018)

Standard abbreviations
- ISO 4: Politics Gend.

Indexing
- ISSN: 1743-923X (print); 1743-9248 (web)
- LCCN: 2008236563
- OCLC no.: 62558448

Links
- Journal homepage; Online access; Online archive

Politics & Gender is a political science journal that publishes scholarship on gender and politics and on women and politics. It aims to represent the full range of questions, issues, and approaches on gender and women across the major subfields of political science, including comparative politics, international relations, political theory, and U.S. politics. It seeks to publish studies that address fundamental questions in politics and political science from the perspective of gender difference, as well as those that interrogate and challenge standard analytical categories and conventional methodologies. The journal is edited by Susan Franceschet and Christina Wolbrecht and its book reviews are edited by Meryl Kenney.

== Abstracting and indexing ==
- CSA Worldwide Political Science Abstracts
- Environmental Sciences and Pollution Management
- European Reference Index for the Humanities and Social Sciences (ERIH PLUS)
- International Bibliography of the Social Sciences
- Current Abstracts
- SocINDEX
- SocINDEX with Full Text
- TOC Premier (Table of Contents)
- SCOPUS
- Feminist Periodicals Online
- International Political Science Abstracts
- Article First
- Electronic Collections Online
- Environmental and Pollution Management
- Sociological Abstracts
- GenderWatch Online

According to the Journal Citation Reports, the journal has a 2018 impact factor of .779, ranking it 29 out of 44 journals in the category "Women's Studies" and 136 out of 176 journals in the category "Political Science".

== See also ==
- List of political science journals
- List of women's studies journals
