= Leon Epstein =

American political scientist

Leon David Epstein (May 29, 1919 – August 1, 2006) was an American political scientist.

== Life and career ==
He was born in Milwaukee on May 29, 1919, and raised in Beaver Dam, Wisconsin. He enrolled at the University of Wisconsin–Madison in 1936 to study economics, earning his bachelor's and master's degree in 1940 and 1941, respectively. While serving in the military, Epstein was stationed in the United Kingdom and took classes at the University of Oxford. He subsequently completed a doctorate at the University of Chicago in 1948. Epstein began teaching at the University of Oregon in 1947, and accepted a faculty position at his alma mater, UW–Madison, in 1949. Two years later, Epstein was promoted to associate professor, followed by full professor status in 1958. He chaired the political science department from 1960 to 1963, and was dean of the College of Letters and Sciences between 1965 and 1969. Epstein led the Midwest Political Science Association in 1972, and served as president of the American Political Science Association from 1977 to 1978. He received a Guggenheim Fellowship in 1979. Epstein retired from teaching in 1988, and became the Hilldale Professor of Political Science, Emeritus. He died at home in Madison on August 1, 2006, of injuries from a fall.

The Leon Epstein Outstanding Book Award given by the American Political Science Association is named for Esptein. He was married to Shirley Golewitz from 1948 to her death in 2001.
