= Shireen Hassim =

South African political scientist

- Education: York University
- Awards: Victoria Schuck Award
- Scientific career
- Fields: Political science; History; Gender studies; African studies
- Workplaces: University of the Witwatersrand; Radcliffe Institute at Harvard University; Carleton University

Shireen Hassim is a South African political scientist, historian, and scholar of gender studies and African studies. She is a Professor in the Department of Political Studies at the University of the Witwatersrand, where she is also affiliated with the Institute for Social and Economic Research. In 2019 she became a Canada 150 Research Chair in Gender and African Politics, beginning a seven-year term in the Institute for African Studies at Carleton University. Hassim was the first woman of colour full professor of political science in South Africa.

== Career ==
Hassim holds a PhD from York University in Toronto.

In 2006, Hassim published the book Women's organizations and democracy in South Africa: Contesting authority, in which she uses archival research, interviews, and observational studies to analyse the role of women in the South African liberation movements of the 1980s and 1990s. Hassim particularly focuses on the tension between the ideologies of feminism and nationalism as motivators for the women's movement in the last several years of Apartheid and the first few years of democratic governance. Part of this tension stemmed from the perception that issues important to women specifically were distractions from the goal of dismantling the racist political system, even though women were a key constituency in the fight to build a new political regime. Hassim incorporates feminist scholarship from Africa, Latin America, Europe and the United States to demonstrate that the women's organizations she studies were not just feminist or nationalist but rather were both at the same time. Hassim also builds on work by Maxine Molyneux to study the autonomy of the women's movements in South African liberation activism, and particularly to understand the potential for women's activism to be co-opted by one of the other ideologies it followed or employed rhetoric from. Women's organizations and democracy in South Africa won the 2007 Victoria Schuck Award from the American Political Science Association, which is an annual prize granted to the author of the best book published in the previous year on the topic of on women and politics.

Hassim was a co-editor of the book No Shortcuts to Power: African Women in Politics and Policy Making (2003) with Anne Marie Goetz, and the co-editor with Eric Worby and Tawana Kupe of Go Home Or Die Here: Violence, Xenophobia and the Reinvention of Difference in South Africa (2008).

During the 2017–2018 school year, Hassim was the Matina S. Horner Distinguished Visiting Professor at The Radcliffe Institute for Advanced Study at Harvard University. At Radcliffe she worked on Fatima Meer: Voices of liberation, which she published in 2019. Fatima Meer: Voices of liberation was included on the Mail & Guardian's Humanities Awards 2020 Long List Collection among the best Non-Fiction Monographs.

In 2019, Hassim was named a Canada 150 Research Chair, which came with a 7-year appointment to the Institute for African Studies at Carleton University in Ottawa. This made her one of two faculty to have a full appointment in that institute, which is mostly interdisciplinary.

Hassim has been quoted, or her work has been cited, in media outlets including The Mail & Guardian, Independent Online, The Times, DW News, France 24, and in publications by The Carnegie Endowment for International Peace. Hassim was a steering committee member of the Women's Living History Monument in South Africa, a project to develop the first museum of women's history in Africa.

== Selected works ==
- Women's organizations and democracy in South Africa: Contesting authority (2006)
- "Fragile Stability: State and Society in Democratic South Africa", Journal of Southern African Studies, with Jo Beall and Stephen Gelb (2006)
- Fatima Meer: Voices of liberation (2019)

== Selected awards ==
- Victoria Schuck Award, American Political Science Association (2007)
- Canada 150 Research Chair at Carleton University (2019)
