= Victoria Schuck =

American political scientist

- Born: March 16, 1909; Oklahoma City, Oklahoma
- Died: February 15, 1999 (aged 89); Chevy Chase, Maryland
- Education: Stanford University
- Awards: Namesake for Victoria Schuck Award, APSA; Namesake for Victoria Schuck Chair, Stanford
- Scientific career
- Fields: Political science
- Workplaces: Florida State University; US Office of Price Administration; Mount Holyoke College; Mount Vernon College; Smith College; Stanford University; Brookings Institution

Victoria Schuck (1909–1999) was an American political scientist who was the president of Mount Vernon College from 1977 to 1983. As an expert on the political participation of women and women as political candidates, she contributed to the development of the study of women and politics as a subfield of political science. She also specialized in the state politics of New England, and the politics of South Vietnam. As one of the first 80 women to earn a PhD in political science, Schuck published extensively on the status of women in the profession. In total she published more than 80 articles or monographs, and co-edited several academic books. Schuck spent most of her career at Mount Holyoke College, where she was a Professor of Political Science from 1940 until 1977, and prior to that she was a professor at Florida State University.

== Early life and education ==
Schuck was born on February 15, 1909, in Oklahoma City, Oklahoma, to Anthony B. Schuck and Anna Prieb Schuck. She was raised in San Marino, California. She attended Stanford University, where she earned a BA degree in 1930, an MA in 1931, and a PhD in 1937, all in political science. In 2003, a publication by George Washington University estimated that this made her "one of the first 80 or so women to earn a Ph.D. in political science".

== Career ==
Schuck was a professor of political science at Florida State University (then Florida State College for Women) from 1937 until 1940, when she joined the faculty at Mount Holyoke College. During World War II, Schuck worked as a principal program analyst at the Office of Price Administration in the Office for Emergency Management of the Federal government of the United States. In 1977, she left Mount Holyoke to become president of Mount Vernon College, where she remained until 1983. Mount Vernon College which was purchased in 1999 by George Washington University, and became the Mount Vernon Campus of The George Washington University. Schuck was also a visiting professor at Smith College during the 1948–1949 school year, a visiting professor at Stanford University in 1952, and a visiting scholar at the Brookings Institution during 1967–1968.

Schuck was an early researcher in the topic of women and politics. Her studies of women and politics included research on women who were politicians, as well as on women's political participation as citizens. Schuck also published papers regarding the situation for women in political science during the second half of the 20th century.

Schuck specialized particularly in the state politics of New England, especially Massachusetts. She also conducted comparative politics work on elections and political participation. Notably, she received funding in 1996 and 1971 to observe elections in South Vietnam. As part of that project, she also researched the Constitution of South Vietnam. Following the Watergate scandal, Schuck wrote a review of scholarly works on the topic.

In addition to her scholarly articles, Schuck was an editor of the 1979 book Women Organizing: An Anthology, and the 1980 book New England Politics. During the 1970s, she was a political science book reviewer for the Key Reporter magazine of the Phi Beta Kappa honor society.

From 1978 to 1980, Schuck was a member of the D.C. Commission on Post-Secondary Education. She also served on the House Commission on Administrative Review of the United States House of Representatives, on the United States Presidential Commission on Registration and Voter Participation formed by John F. Kennedy, and as a United States representative to the conference of the United Nations Decade for Women in Nairobi. Schuck was also a nongovernmental representative to the United Nations Commission on the Status of Women.

== Recognition ==
Schuck was involved in the development of women and politics as a subfield of political science, including close involvement with the founding of the Women's Caucus of the American Political Science Association in 1969 and membership on the Association's 1971 Committee on the Status of Women.

Schuck is the namesake of the American Political Science Association's Victoria Schuck Award, an annual award that is granted each year to the author or authors of the best book published in the previous year on the topic of women and politics. This award is one of the few awards that is granted directly by the American Political Science Association and not by one of its area-specific sections. The prize was established in 1986, after Schuck advocated for the establishment of a book prize for women and politics scholarship. Schuck endowed it with an initial fund of $3000, to be given in increments of $500 per annual award, and to be funded thereafter by the Association through contributions. By 2020 the award carried a prize of $750.

Stanford University endows a Victoria Schuck Faculty Scholar Chair in Political Science, funded through the Victoria Schuck Faculty Scholar Fund.

In 2003, a portrait of Schuck was hung at the Mount Vernon Campus of George Washington University to commemorate her years as president of Mount Vernon College.

== Selected works ==
- "Women in Political Science: Some Preliminary Observations", PS: Political Science & Politics (1969)
- "In search of political woman", Social Science Quarterly, with Mary L. Shanley (1974)
- Women Organizing: An Anthology, co-editor (1979)
- New England Politics, co-editor (1980)
