= Kristin Bumiller =

American political scientist

- Education: Northwestern University; University of Wisconsin–Madison
- Awards: Victoria Schuck Award
- Scientific career
- Fields: Political science; Political philosophy
- Workplaces: Amherst College

Kristin Bumiller is an American political scientist. She is the George Daniel Olds Professor in Economic and Social Institutions at Amherst College. She has published work on the structure of anti-discrimination law and the legal responses to rape and domestic violence.

== Career ==
Bumiller attended Northwestern University, obtaining a BA degree and an MA degree in political science in 1979. In 1984, she graduated from the University of Wisconsin–Madison with a PhD in political science. Amherst College granted her an honorary AM degree in 2001.

In 1988, Bumiller published The Civil Rights Society. Using interviews with victims of race, gender, and age discrimination and studying changes in the two decades following the Civil Rights Act, she argues that the type of legal protection that forms the basis of civil rights law prevents victims of structural oppression from liberating themselves. Many anti-discrimination laws assume that victims will report offenses that have been perpetrated against them and will willingly participate in the process of remedying those offenses, but Bumiller shows that this assumption is often not justified. Worse, Bumiller argues that legal remediation is designed in such a way that it often results in misinterpretations and misrepresentations of the victim, so that remedies which are supposedly designed to right injustices instead encourage victims to passively accept discrimination. A victim who does not pursue legal actions that they justifiably feel might harm them can be more easily portrayed as tacitly accepting the abuse that they are subjected to, so these systems can actually worsen discrimination. By criticizing the foundations of anti-discrimination laws, Bumiller questions the efficacy of civil rights legislation that does not alter the structure of legal remedies for discriminatory abuses.

Bumiller published another book in 2008, called In an Abusive State: How Neoliberalism Appropriated the Feminist Movement against Sexual Violence. In In an Abusive State, Bumiller studies the relationship between American feminist efforts in the 1970s to protect women who were victims of rape and abuse and the simultaneous movement towards criminalization and increased state punishment. She argues that the criminal justice movement co-opted the movement to fight violence against women, using it as a pretense to increase the apparatus of the state to control crime and allowing the state to do more violence. Bumiller does not blame the feminist movement for this co-optation, but rather argues that the expansion of repressive state power and the narrative of a universal female victim ironically resulted in re-victimizing the victims of sexual violence. Analyzing two prominent gang rape trials, the New Beford gang rape case and the Central Park jogger case, Bumiller argues that these highly publicized efforts by criminal justice allowed the state to portray itself as a force that helps keep sexual violence contained, in a mechanism called expressive justice, and that these efforts helped develop the harmful idea of a good victim. Bumiller notes that criminal justice efforts directed at suspected perpetrators of sexual violence have taken government money and resources away from grassroots work that aims to support victims. Bumiller connects this trend to a consistent process of privatization in neoliberalism, and notes that many of the state powers that were expanded in response to activism that seeks to reduce violence against women were ironically parts of the government that have been historically criticized by feminist activists. Bumiller offers alternative proposals to reduce violence against women, such as nonviolent preventative measures. The name of In an Abusive State is a double entendre, referring both to the circumstances of women who have had abuse done to them, and to the situation of existing under a state that can abuse its citizens. In an Abusive State won the 2009 Victoria Schuck Award, an annual award that is granted by the American Political Science Association to the author of the best book published in the previous year on the topic of women and politics.

== Selected works ==
- The Civil Rights Society (1988)
- In an Abusive State: How Neoliberalism Appropriated the Feminist Movement against Sexual Violence (2007)
- "Quirky citizens: Autism, gender, and reimagining disability", Signs: Journal of Women in Culture and Society (2008)

== Selected awards ==
- Victoria Schuck Award (2009)
