= Christine Poggi =

American art historian

- Occupations: Professor of History and Art

Academic work
- Institutions: University of Pennsylvania
- Notable works: In Defiance of Painting: Cubism, Futurism, and the Invention of Collage
- Website: https://arth.sas.upenn.edu/people/christine-poggi

Christine Poggi is an American art historian and author. She was professor of modern and contemporary art and criticism in the History of Art Department and in the Italian Section of Romance Languages at University of Pennsylvania until 2017. Since September 2017 she has been the Judy and Michael Steinhardt Director of the Institute of Fine Arts at New York University.

== Education ==
Christine Poggi earned her Bachelor of Arts degree from the University of California, Santa Cruz. She earned a master’s degree from the University of Chicago and a Ph.D. from Yale University.

== Books ==
- In Defiance of Painting: Cubist, Futurism, and the Invention of Collage (Yale University Press; 1992) ISBN 978-0-300-05109-4
- Inventing Futurism: The Art and Politics of Artificial Optimism (Princeton University Press; 2008) ISBN 978-0-691-13370-6. This book won the Dedalus Foundation's 2003 senior fellowship book award, which was then a book project named Modernity as Trauma: The Cultural Politics of Italian Futurism, however when it was published by Princeton its name was changed.
- Picasso: Seven Decades of Drawing, with Olivier Berggruen (Rizzoli; 2022) ISBN 978-0-8478-7180-3

== Awards ==
Poggi has earned fellowships from various institutions, including the Fulbright Commission, the Whitney Humanities Center at Yale University, the National Endowment for the Humanities, the American Association of University Women, the Dedalus Foundation, and the Metropolitan Museum of Art. She received the Ira H. Abrams Memorial Award for Distinguished Teaching from the School of Arts and Sciences in 2009.
