= Elizabeth Shakman Hurd =

American political scientist (born 1970)

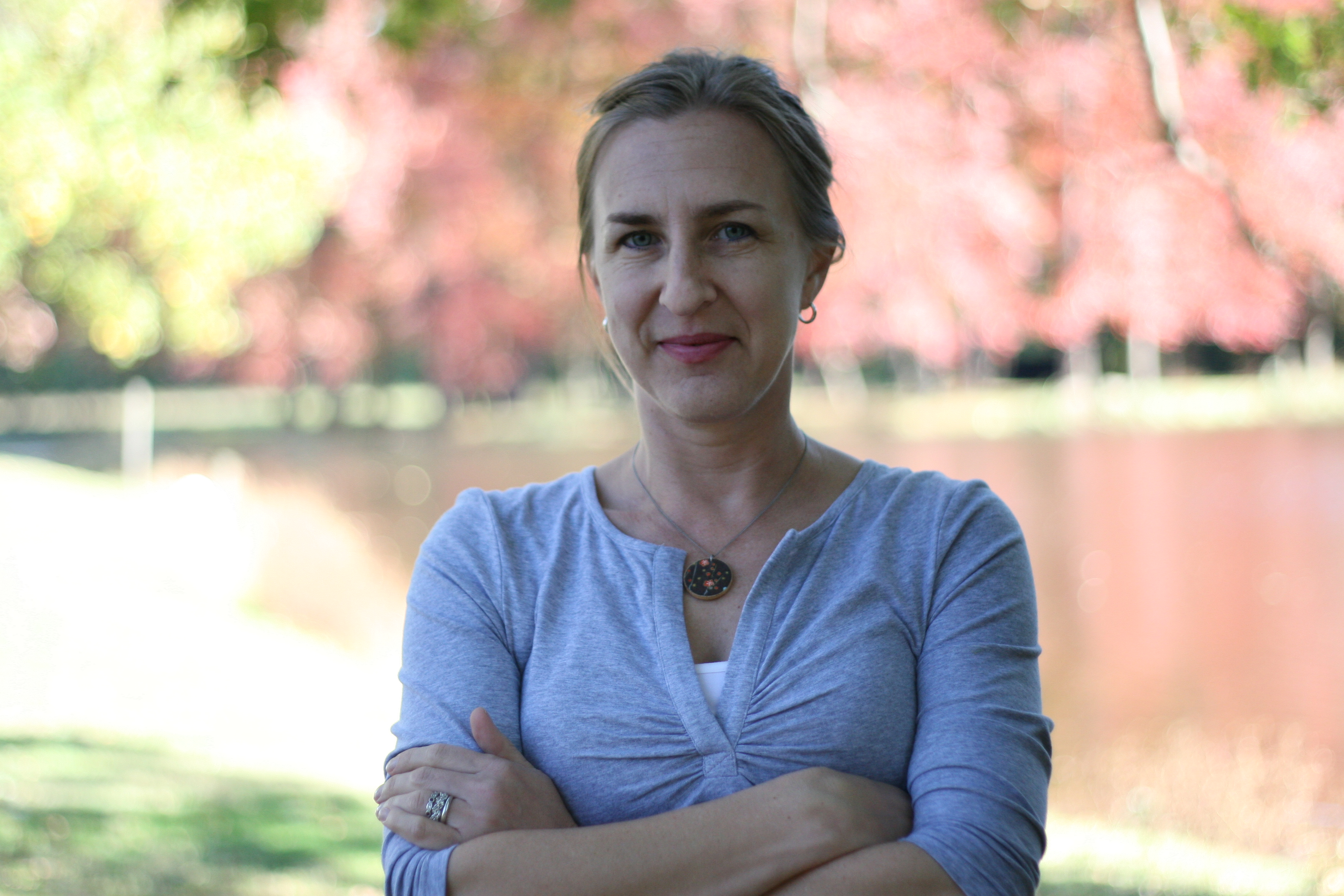
- Elizabeth Shakman Hurd
- Born: 1970 (age 55–56)
- Occupations: scholar of religion and politics

Elizabeth Shakman Hurd (born 1970) is an American scholar and author who studies religion and politics globally. She is professor of political science and religious studies at Northwestern University in Evanston, Illinois.

== Academic career ==
Hurd was educated at Wesleyan University (B.A.), Yale University (M.A.), and Johns Hopkins University (Ph.D). She has taught at Northwestern University since 2002. Hurd is known for her work on Religion and politics in the United States, religion and Foreign policy of the United States, and religion and international relations. She also studies relations between the United States, Europe, and the Middle East, particularly Turkey and Iran. Her writings have appeared in Boston Review, Public Culture, The Atlantic, Chicago Tribune, Foreign Policy, and The Washington Post. Her research has been supported by the Henry Luce Foundation and the American Council of Learned Societies/Luce Program in Religion, Journalism and International Affairs. She is a core faculty member of the Program in Middle East and North African Studies at Northwestern University. and co-director of the Global Religion & Politics Research Group.

== Selected publications ==
- Heaven Has a Wall: Religion, Borders, and the Global United States (University of Chicago Press, 2025).
- Beyond Religious Freedom: The New Global Politics of Religion (Princeton University Press, 2015)
- The Politics of Secularism in International Relations (Princeton University Press, 2008)
- Theologies of American Exceptionalism (open access, co-edited, Indiana University Press, 2020)
- Politics of Religious Freedom (co-edited, University of Chicago, 2015)
- Comparative Secularisms in a Global Age (co-edited, Palgrave Macmillan, 2010)
