= Valentine Moghadam =

Iranian feminist scholar and sociologist

Valentine Moghadam (Persian: والنتین مقدم; born 1952) is a feminist scholar, sociologist, activist, and author whose work focuses on women in development, globalization, feminist networks, and female employment in the Middle East.

She has taught and performed research at various institutions of higher education, most recently as professor of sociology and director of international affairs at Northeastern University. Previously she held the position of director of the Women's Studies Program at Purdue University, where she was also a professor of sociology. Prior to that appointment, Moghadam worked for the United Nations Educational, Scientific and Cultural Organization as the chief of gender equality and development.

Her publication Globalizing Women: Transnational Feminist Networks examines globalization as a gendered process and looks closely at Transnational Feminist Networks (TFNs). In her preface, Moghadam writes, "'globalization-from-above' has engendered 'globalization-from-below,' producing a dynamic and transnational women's movement that has been confronting neoliberal capitalism and patriarchal fundamentalism".

== Early life ==
Valentine Moghadam was born to an Assyrian family in Tehran, Iran to an "urban, elite family" in 1952. After attaining her secondary education at an international school, she spent her first two years in the work force employed at a major daily newspaper, Kayhan. Following her time at the newspaper, Moghadam taught English at the Imperial Air Force Language School. After these initial work experiences, Valentine Moghadam, with the support of her parents, sought a college education in the west.

== Education ==
Valentine Moghadam first studied at the University of Waterloo (Ontario, Canada), where she "joined the Iranian student movement and became a left-wing activist". As an undergraduate, she majored in history and political science and earned her bachelor's degree in 1978. Moghadam earned her M.A. (1983) and Ph.D. (1986) in sociology at American University in Washington, D.C.

== Career ==
As a visiting assistant professor in the department of sociology at New York University, from 1985 to 1988, Moghadam taught several courses about sociology, women, and development. In the following year, under the Pembroke Center for Teaching and Research on Women at Brown University, Moghadam completed research as a postdoctoral fellow. In the fall of 1989 she also taught as a visiting assistant professor in the Program in Middle East Studies at Rutgers University. As a visiting lecturer in the fall of 1990 and a visiting senior lecturer in the fall of 1992, Moghadam taught at the University of Helsinki. Then, from 1990 to 1995, she completed research in Helsinki, Finland, at the WIDER Institute of the United Nations University as the senior researcher and coordinator of the Research Program on Women and Development. From May 2004 to December 2006, Moghadam worked in Paris, France, as the Chief of the Section for Gender Equality and Development in the Social and Human Services Sector of UNESCO. In January 2007, Moghadam was appointed director of the College of Liberal Arts' Women's Studies Program at Purdue University, where she is also a professor in the sociology department. Most recently, she has accepted a position to become a professor of sociology and the director of the department of international affairs at Northeastern University.

== Memberships and accomplishments ==
Moghadam is a member of a variety of professional and feminist organizations. She belongs to the American Sociological Association and the International Sociological Association and serves on its executive committee. In March 1995, she was a member of the United Nations University delegation to the World Summit on Social Development in Copenhagen. Later that year, in September, she also participated in the Fourth World Conference on Women in Beijing. She has also aided in the establishment of the Palestinian Women's Research and Documentation Center, located in Ramallah. Her book Modernizing Women: Gender and Social Change in the Middle East was recognized as a Choice Outstanding Academic Book for the 1993 to 1994 academic year.

She is a member of the Editorial Board for Journal of World-Systems Research.

== Research, influence and ideology ==
Currently, Valentine Moghadam's areas of research include "globalization, transnational feminist networks, civil society and citizenship, and women's employment in the Middle East". Her experiences growing up in Iran influenced her political views, which became more defined in her university education. The Iranian Revolution of 1979 and the continued Islamization in Iran following the revolution made an imprint on Moghadam's ideology. This situation in Iran, and the situation for Iranian women that resulted, sparked her interest in gender politics. Following the conferral of her Ph.D., Moghadam turned her attention to women-in-development, and her identification as a feminist strengthened. Today, the global issues that most concern Moghadam are "the adverse effects of economic globalization, militarism," and the fight for "women's rights everywhere, but especially in Iran, Iraq, and Afghanistan".

== Authored works ==
- Moghadam, Valentine (2020). Globalization and Social Movements: The Populist Challenge and Democratic Alternatives (Third ed.). Lanham: Rowman & Littlefield Publishers.
- Moghadam, Valentine (2005). Globalizing Women: Transnational Feminist Networks. Baltimore: Johns Hopkins University Press.
- Moghadam, Valentine (1994). Identity Politics and Women: Cultural Reassertions and Feminisms in International Perspective. Boulder: Westview Press.
- Moghadam, Valentine (1993). Modernizing Women: Gender and Social Change in the Middle East. Boulder: Lynne Rienner Publishers.
- Moghadam, Valentine (1998). Women, Work, and Economic Reform in the Middle East and North Africa. Boulder: Lynne Rienner Publishers.
