= Tomoko Masuzawa =

American philosopher (born 1979)

Philosophical work
- Era: Contemporary philosophy
- Region: Western philosophy
- Institutions: University of Michigan; Department of Comparative Literature; Department of History
- Main interests: Religious studies; hermeneutics; psychoanalysis

Tomoko Masuzawa (fl. 1979 - present) is professor emerita of Comparative Literature and History at the University of Michigan. In 1979, she received her MA in religious studies at Yale University. Masuzawa received her PhD in Religious Studies from University of California Santa Barbara in 1985. European intellectual history (19th century), discourses on religion, history of religion, and psychoanalysis are Masuzawa's fields of study.

== Bibliography ==
- In Search of Dreamtime: The Quest for the Origin of Religion (1993)
- "Culture" in Mark C. Taylor (ed.), Critical Terms for Religious Studies (1998)
- "Origin" in Willi Braun and Russell T. McCutcheon (eds.), Guide to the Study of Religion (1999)
- "From Empire to Utopia: Effacement of Colonial Markings in Lost Horizon" in Positions: East Asia Cultural Critique (1999)
- The Invention of World Religions or, How European Universalism was Preserved in the Language of Pluralism (2005)
