= United States Bureau of Efficiency =

US government bureau from 1916 to 1933

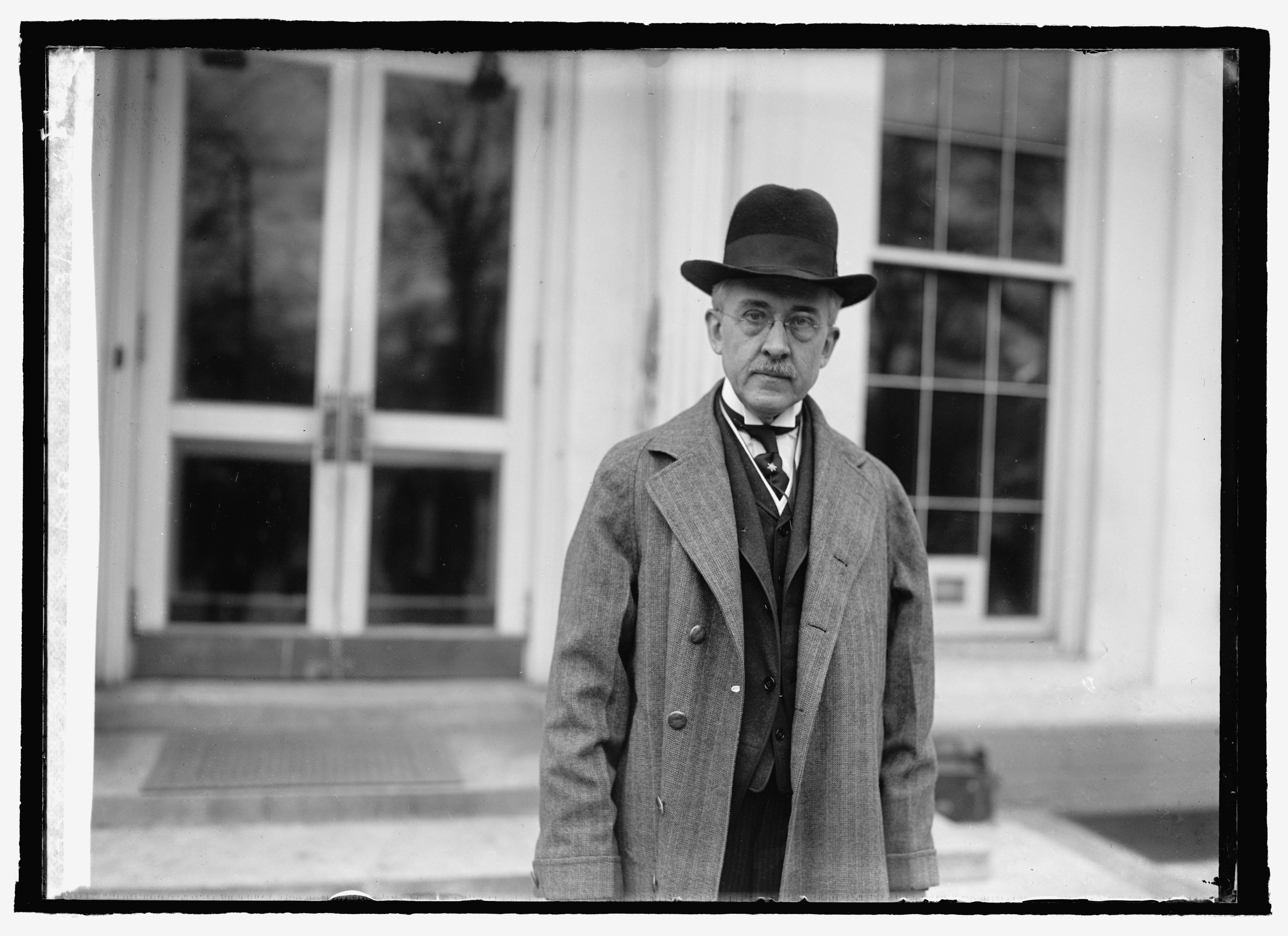
Brown in March 1922

The United States Bureau of Efficiency was a bureau under the United States federal government from 1916 to 1933. The Woodrow Wilson administration established this bureau for creating efficiency ratings "for the classified service in the several executive departments in the District of Columbia". Prior to 1916, its efforts had been organized under the Division of Efficiency within the United States Civil Service Commission. The bureau was discontinued by the newly inaugurated Franklin D. Roosevelt early in his presidency in 1933.

In 1915, Woodrow Wilson, then president of the United States, appointed Herbert D. Brown to head the bureau.
