= List of botanical gardens in Slovakia =

Botanical gardens in Slovakia have collections consisting entirely of Slovakia native and endemic species; most have a collection that include plants from around the world. There are botanical gardens and arboreta in all states and territories of Slovakia, most are administered by local governments, some are privately owned.

- Botanical Garden of the Comenius University
- Botanická zahrada (Banská Štiavnica)
- Botanická záhrada Univerzity P.J. Šafárika (Košice)
- Botanická záhrada pri SPU v Nitre
- Lesnícke arborétum Kysihýbel, Banská Štiavnica
- Arboretum Mlyňany, Tesárske Mlyňany
- Arborétum Borová hora, Zvolen, miestna časť Borová hora
- Arborétum Liptovský Hrádok, Liptovský Hrádok
