= Vitaly Khonik =

Russian physicist (born 1955)

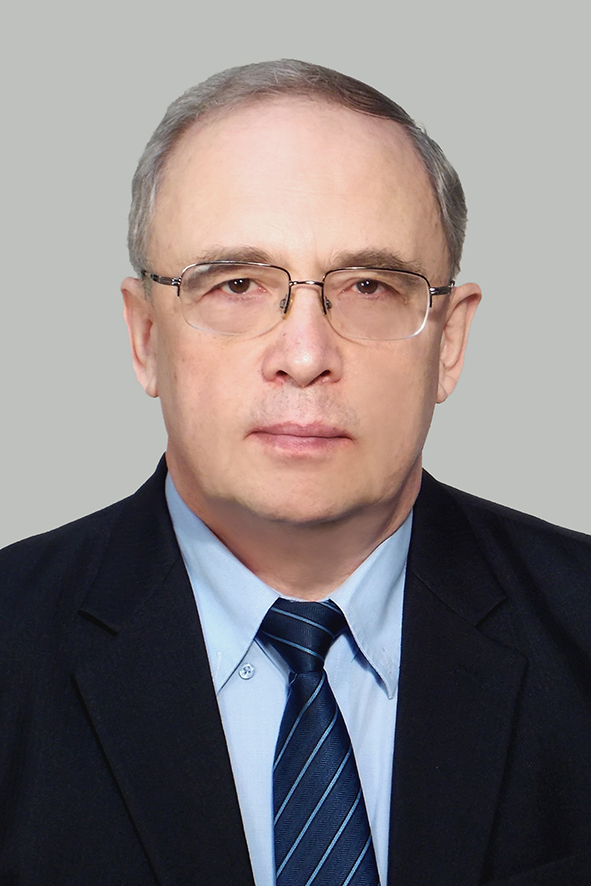
- Born: 17 December 1955 (age 70)
- Citizenship: Russian Federation
- Education: Doctor of Science (physics and mathematics)
- Alma mater: Voronezh State Technical University (VSTU)
- Awards: Honored Worker in Higher Professional Education
- Scientific career
- Institutions: Voronezh State Pedagogical University
- Website: hosting.vspu.ac.ru/~khonik

Khonik Vitaly Alexandrovich (Russian: Хоник Виталий Александрович; born 17 December 1955) is a Russian physicist, doctor of physics and mathematics, professor, head of a laboratory researching the physics of non-crystalline materials, and head of the Department of General Physics at Voronezh State Pedagogical University (VSPU). He was born in Kemerovo, USSR.

His laboratory collaborates with the Institute of Solid State Physics of the Russian Academy of Sciences, the Institute of Physics of the Slovak Academy of Sciences, the Institut für Materialphysik in Germany and the School of Mechanics and Civil Architecture of Northwestern Polytechical University in China.

== Education, academic degrees and titles ==
- 1994 - Professor
- 1992 - Doctor of Science (physics & mathematics), focusing on solid state physics
- 1991 - Senior researcher in solid state physics
- 1983 - Candidate for a doctoral degree in solid state physics
- 1978 - Graduated from Voronezh Polytechnic Institute (VPI), majoring in solid state physics

== Employment history ==
- 2010 to present - Head of the Department of General Physics at VSPU
- 1992 to 2010 - Professor at VSPU
- 1992 - Associate professor at VSPU
- 1991-1992 - Associate professor at VPI
- 1985-1991 - Senior researcher at VPI
- 1984-1985 - Junior researcher at VPI
- 1981-1983 - Doctoral student at VPI
- 1978-1981 - Engineer and physicist at VPI

== Academic awards ==
- Awarded the title "Soros Professor" in 1997, 1998 and 1999.
- Honored Worker in Higher Professional Education (2011).

== International experience ==
- July 2019 - Visiting professor at Northwestern Polytechical University, Xi'an, China
- July 2018 - Visiting professor at Northwestern Polytechical University, Xi'an, China
- October 2016 - Visiting professor at the Institute of Physics, Chinese Academy of Sciences, Beijing, China
- August 2012 - Visiting professor at the department of physics, University of Illinois at Urbana-Champaign, USA
- May 2009 - Guest professor at the school of materials science, Harbin Institute of Technology, China
- April 2007 – Guest professor at Roskilde University, Denmark
- January 2007 to February 2007 – Visiting scholar at the physics department, University of Illinois at Urbana-Champaign, USA
- January 2006 to March 2006 – Scholar of the Japanese Society for the Promotion of Science (JSPS) at the graduate school of natural science and technology of Kanazawa University, Japan
- January 2005 to February 2005 – Visiting scholar at the physics department, University of Illinois at Urbana-Champaign, USA
- April 2003 to August 2003 – Visiting scholar at the physics department, University of Illinois at Urbana-Champaign, USA
- October 2002 to December 2002 – Scholar of the German Service for Academic Exchanges (DAAD), Technical University Carolo-Wilhelmina, Braunschweig, Germany
- May 1999 to April 2000 – Associate professor of the mechanical system engineering department, Kanazawa University, Kanazawa, Japan
- Visiting professor at the Institute of Experimental Physics, Slovak Academy of Sciences, Kosice, Slovakia (two to four week visits in 1996, 1998 and 2001)

== International conferences and workshops ==
- Internal Friction and Ultrasonic Attenuation (ICIFUAS, Italy 1993, France 1996, Spain 2002)
- Mechanical Spectroscopy (Poland 2000)
- Structure of Non-Crystalline Solids (Czech Republic 1996)
- 18th International Congress on Glass (USA 1998)
- Physics of Amorphous Solids: Mechanical Properties and Plasticity (France, Les Houches, March 2010 )
- ACAM Workshop on Multiscale Modelling of Amorphous Materials: from Structure to Mechanical Properties (Dublin, Ireland, July 2011)
- 8th International Discussion Meeting on Relaxations in Complex Systems (Wisla, Poland, July 2017).

== Major scientific projects ==
- Ministry of Education and Science of the Russian Federation, No 3.114.2014/К, "Nature of relaxation phenomena in non-crystalline metallic materials - new theoretical concepts and experiments", 2014–2016.
- Ministry of Education and Science of the Russian Federation, No 3.1310.2017/4.6, "Shear elasticity relaxation as a fundamental basis for the description and prediction of the physical properties of amorphous alloys", 2017–2019.
- Russian Science Foundation, No 20-62-46003, "Amorphous alloys: a new approach to the understanding of the defect structure and its influence on physical properties", 2020 – present.
