= Juraj Marušiak =

Slavic academic

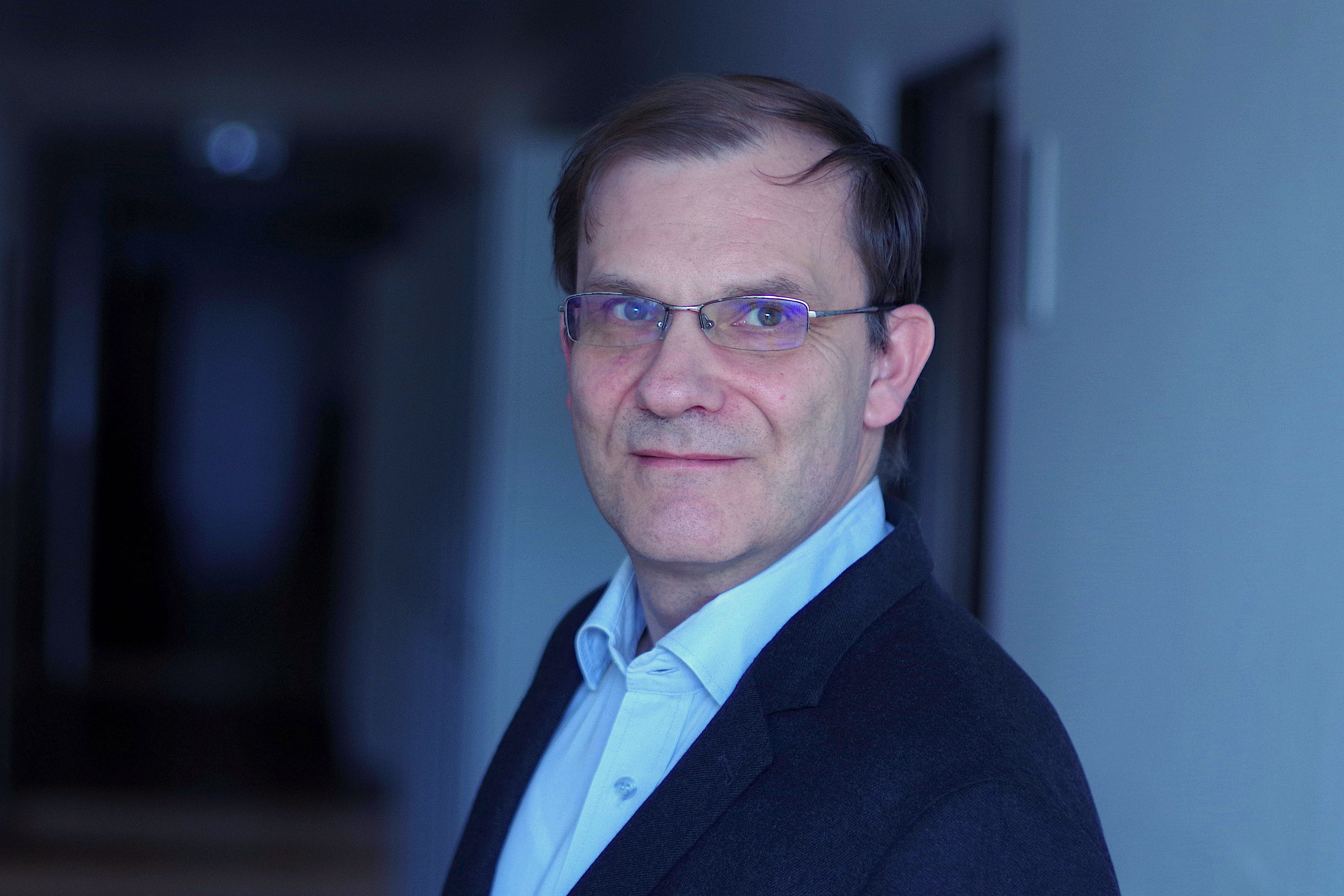
Juraj Marušiak

Juraj Marusiak PhD. (in Slovak: Juraj Marušiak; born 10 July 1970, in Bratislava) is a Slovak political scientist, historian, journalist and translator of a mixed Slovak-Polish descent. He represents a moderate social-democratic stream in Slovak political thinking.

== Life ==
Marušiak graduated from the Faculty of Arts of Comenius University in Bratislava (1994). Since 1996 he has been employed at the Institute of Political Science of SAS (the Slovak Academy of Science), where he obtained his PhD in 2003. From 2000 until 2009 he served as a Scientific Secretary of this Institute and since 2009 he has been head of the Scientific Board. From 2004 to 2010 he was chairman of the Society for Central and Eastern Europe. In 2013-2021 he was a member of the Presidium of Slovak Academy of Sciences.

== Publications ==
Slovenská literatúra a moc v druhej polovici 50 rokov (Slovak Literature and Political Power in the 1950s), Brno, 2001, 181 pp.

His professional articles are mostly about problems of Central and Eastern Europe in 20th and 21st centuries.
