= Arboretum Mlyňany =

Arboretum in Mlyňany

Arboretum Mlynany
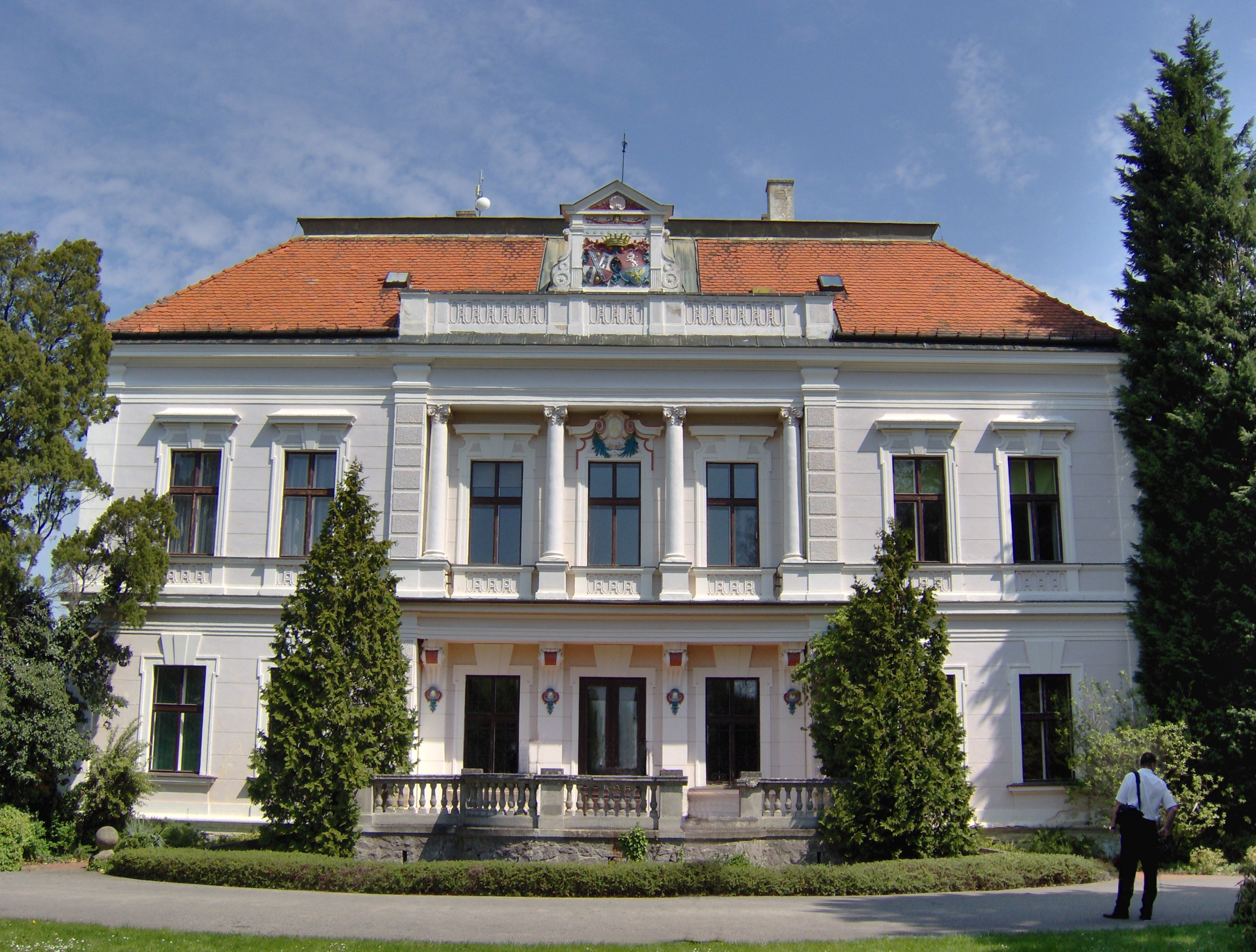
- Manor in the Arboretum
- Interactive map of Arboretum Mlynany
- Location: Tesárske Mlyňany, Slovakia
- Coordinates: 48.31972°N 18.36889°E
- Area: 67 ha (170 acres)

The Mlyňany Arboretum of the Slovak Academy of Sciences, commonly referred to as simply Arboretum Mlyňany, is a protected area near the villages of Tesárske Mlyňany and Vieska nad Žitavou in the Zlaté Moravce district of Slovakia. It covers an area of 67 ha and was declared a protected area in 1951. Currently, the arboretum is a scientific institution of the Slovak Academy of Sciences. It is open to the public year-round, with the exception of some holidays.

It is the most important dendrological facility in Slovakia and one of the biggest in Central Europe, with collections containing more than 2,300 species of trees from the Mediterranean, America, Africa and Asia.

== History ==
The Mlyňany Arboretum was founded in 1892 by the Hungarian nobleman Dr. Štefan Ambrózy-Migazzi. Štefan Ambrózy acquired a large estate by marrying Antónia Migazzi, to which he added an oak-hornbeam grove in Vieska nad Žitavou. In 1894, the main feature of the arboretum - Ambrózy's mansion - was completed, and in 1905 a characteristic tower was added to the mansion. The impetus for building the arboretum was Ambrózy's frequent visits and stays amidst the vegetation of southern Italy. Along with Ambrózy, the professional gardener Jozef Mišák also participated in the construction from the beginning.

== Expositions ==
The Mlyňany Arboretum of the Slovak Academy of Sciences currently covers an area of 67 ha. Its oldest part is the Ambrozy Park, which forms the core of the park. Other parts were gradually added. The main sightseeing route is 4.5 km long and leads through the Ambrozy Park, the North American and East Asian areas to the east of the park. The main sections are:

- Ambrozy Park – The area of the Ambrozy Park is 40 ha. It was founded in the original oak-hornbeam forest. The original growth was gradually cut down and noble trees were planted. The marginal parts of the original growth have been preserved to this day. The park contains a unique collection of evergreen deciduous trees and conifers. This part houses a mansion.
- East Asian area – The pagoda by the Chinese pond, which no longer exists, is the area of the East Asian area. The area of the East Asian area is 14 ha. It began to be built in 1960.
- North American Area – The area of the North American Area is 7.5 ha. It was founded in 1974.
- Korean Area – The area of the Korean Area is 5.5 ha. It is the newest part of the park. A separate sightseeing circuit runs through it. It was founded in 1985.
- Slovak Area – The area of the Slovak Area is 5 ha. It is the newest part of the park, construction began in 1992. An educational trail, marked in blue, runs through it

== Gallery ==
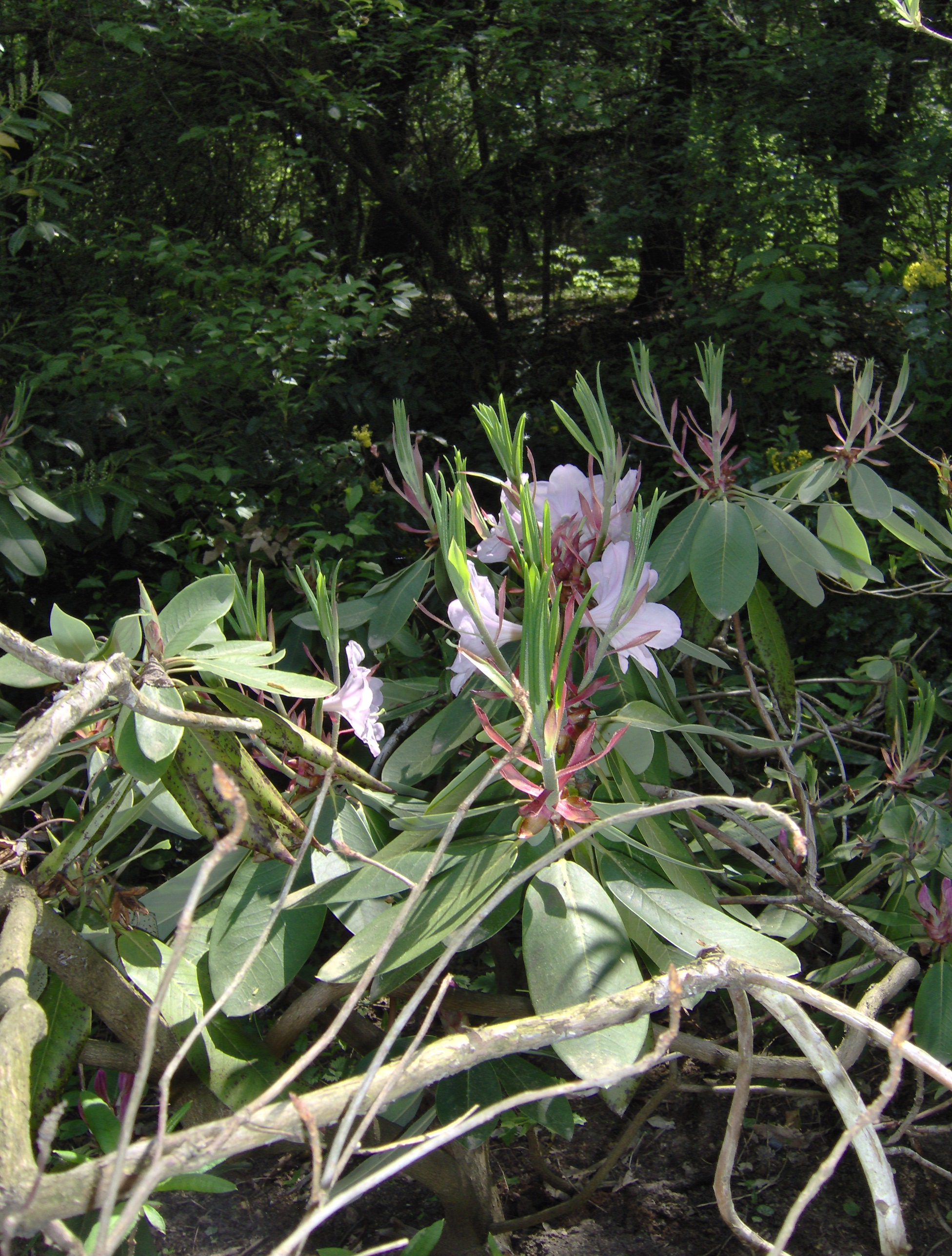

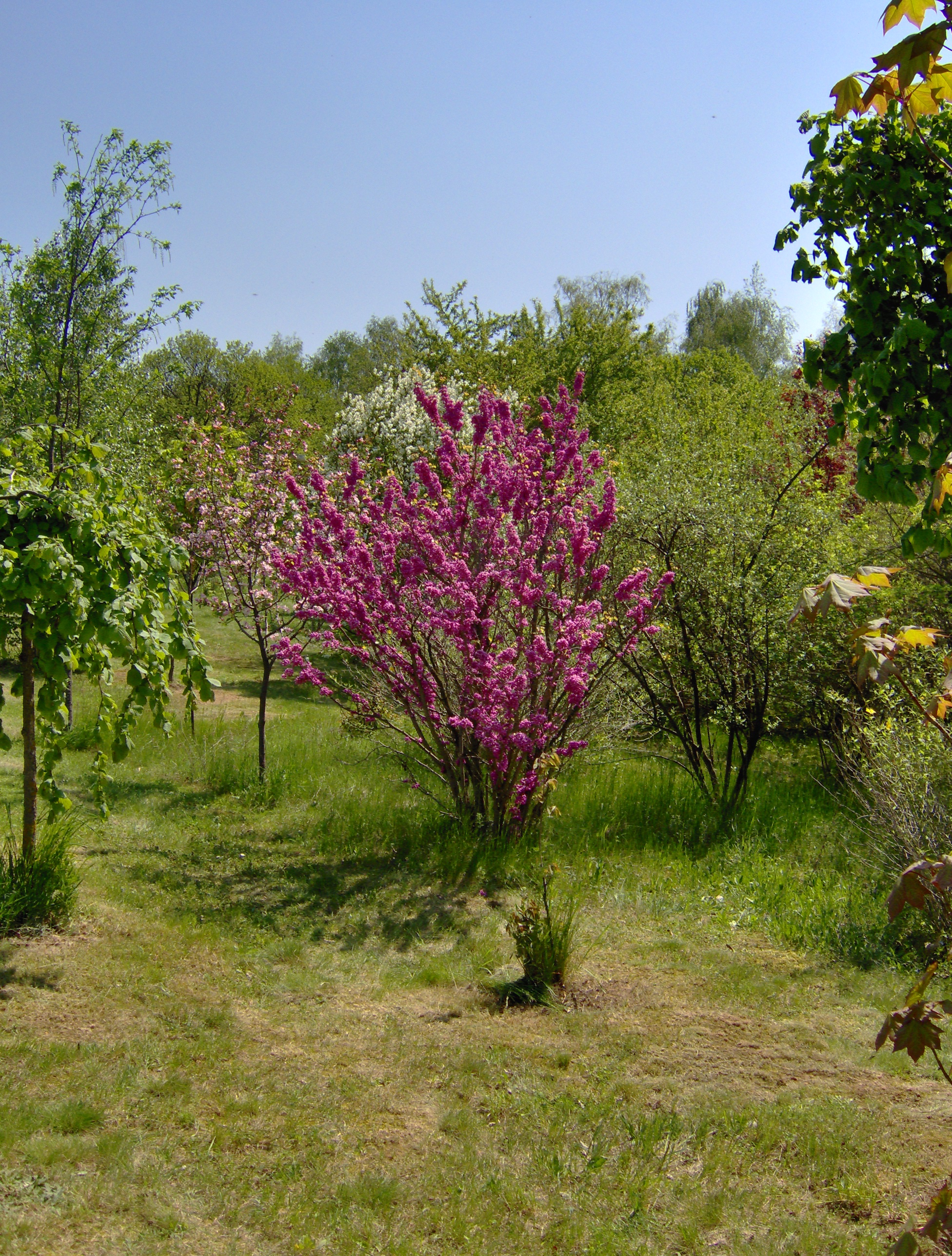

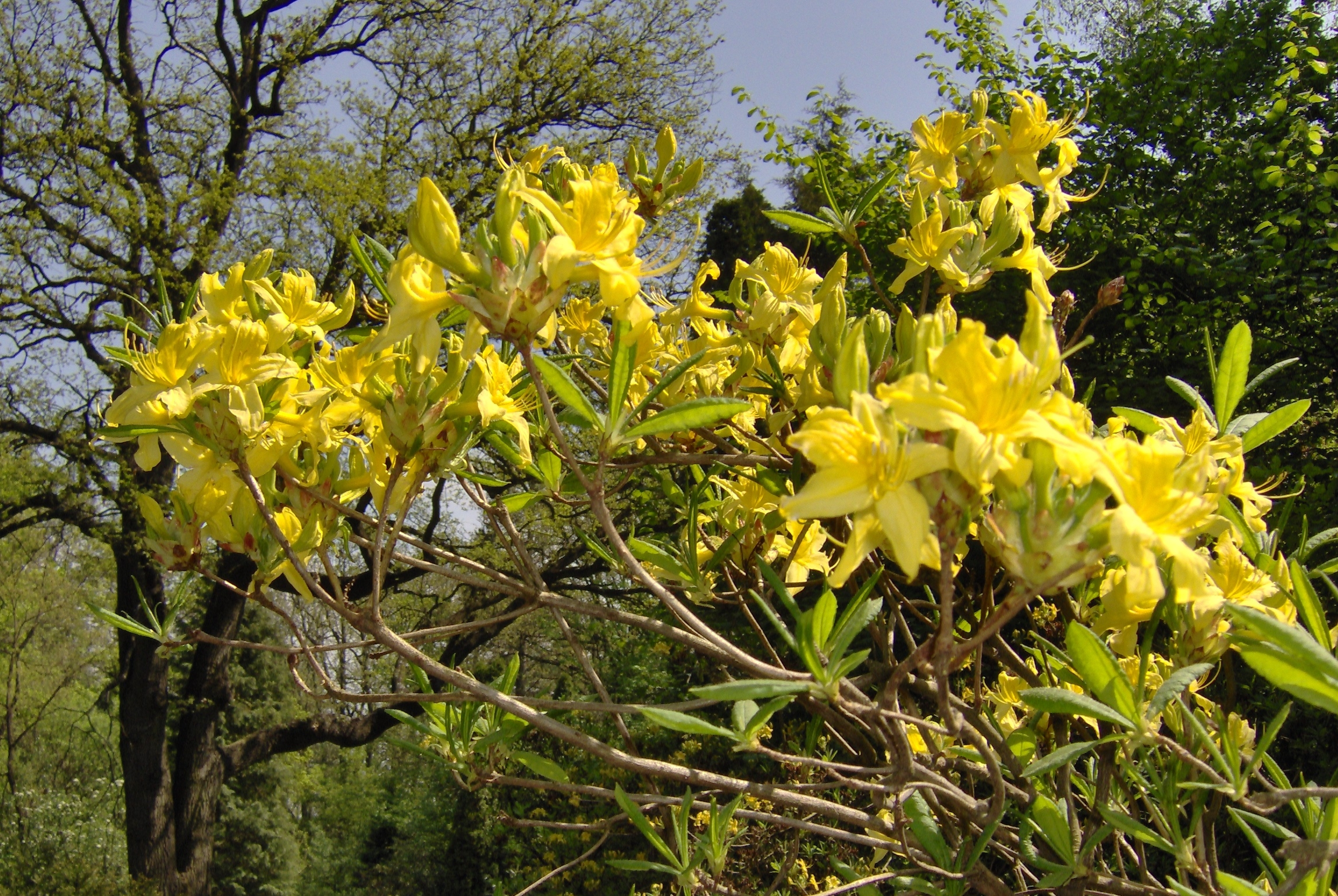

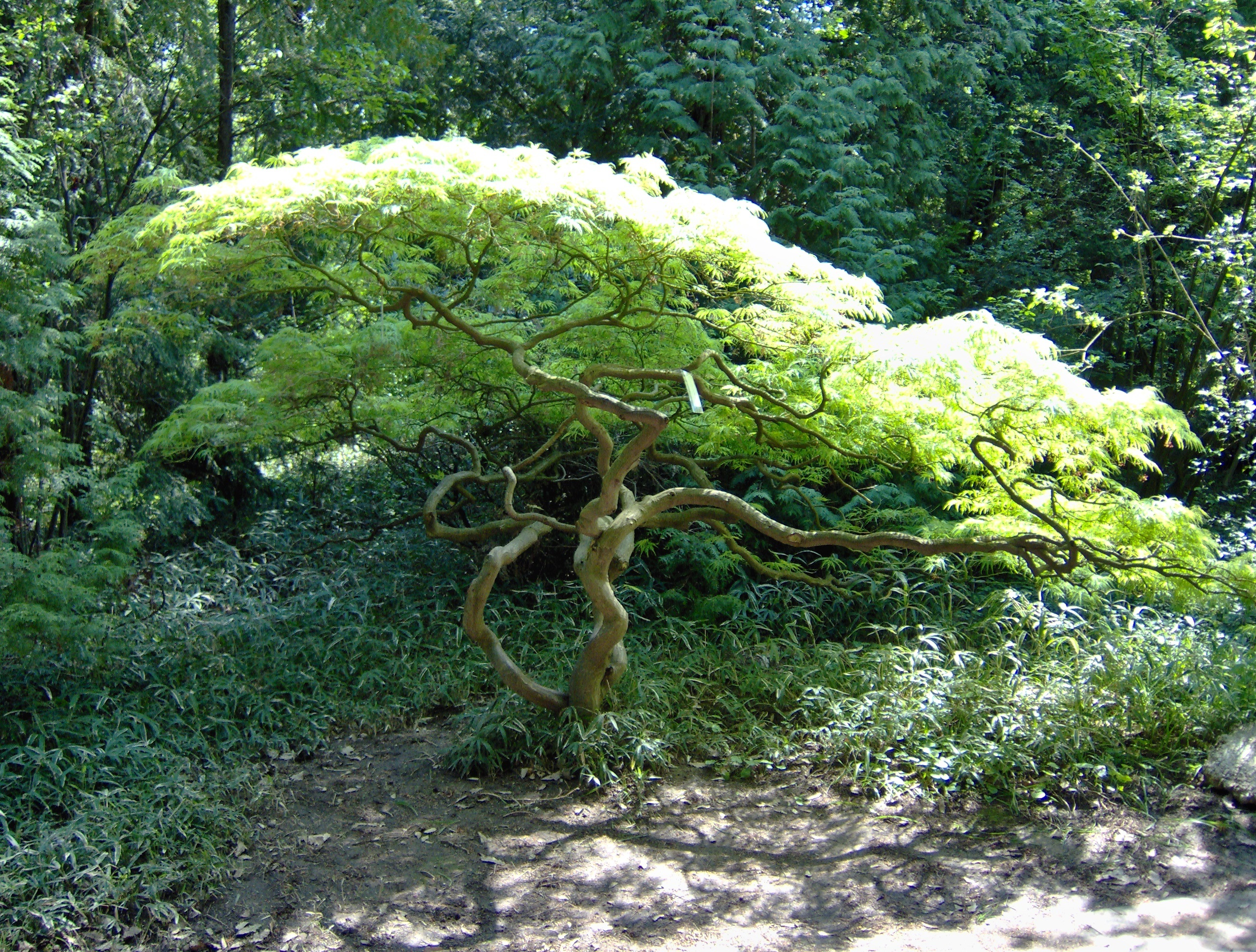

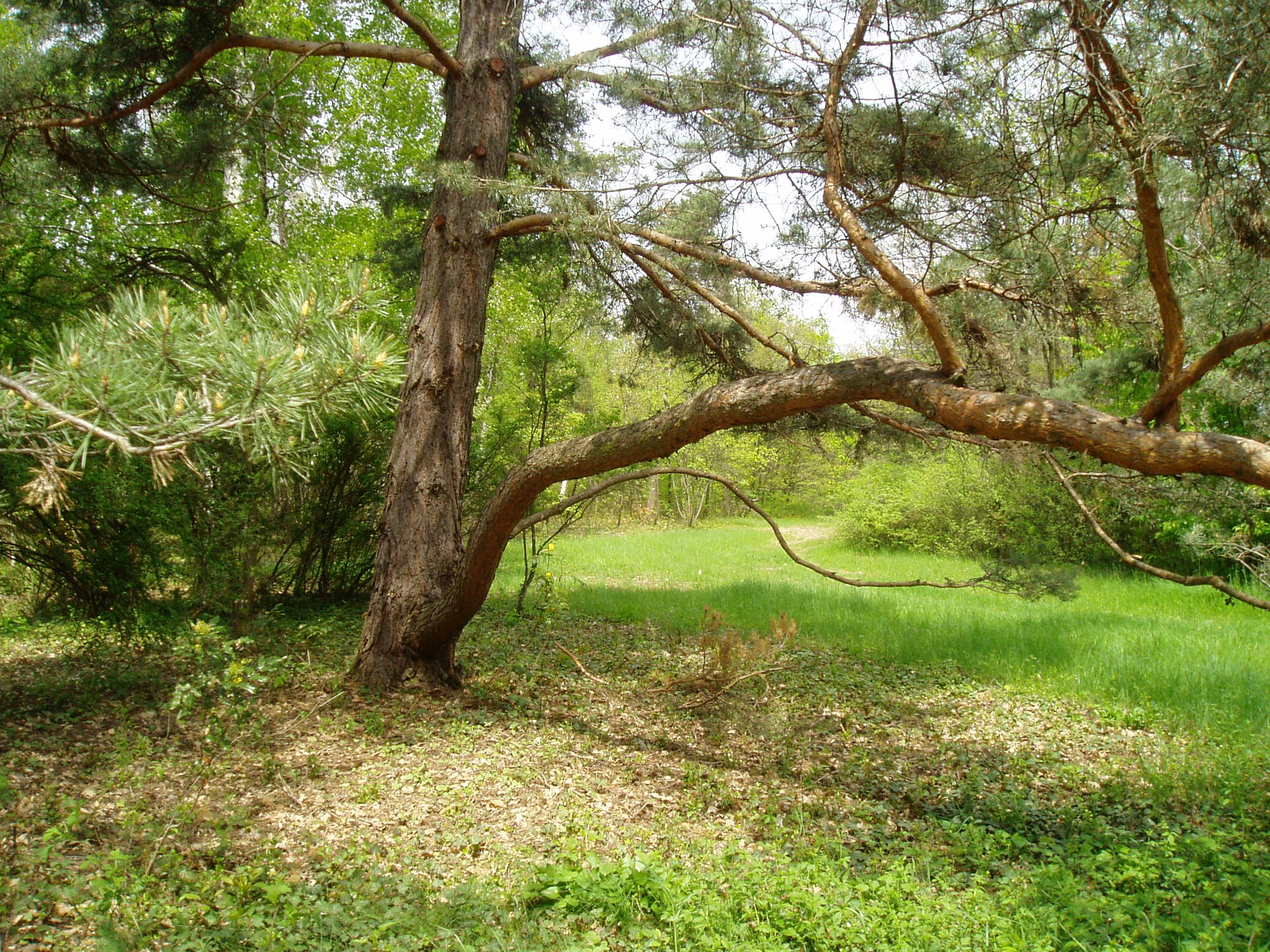

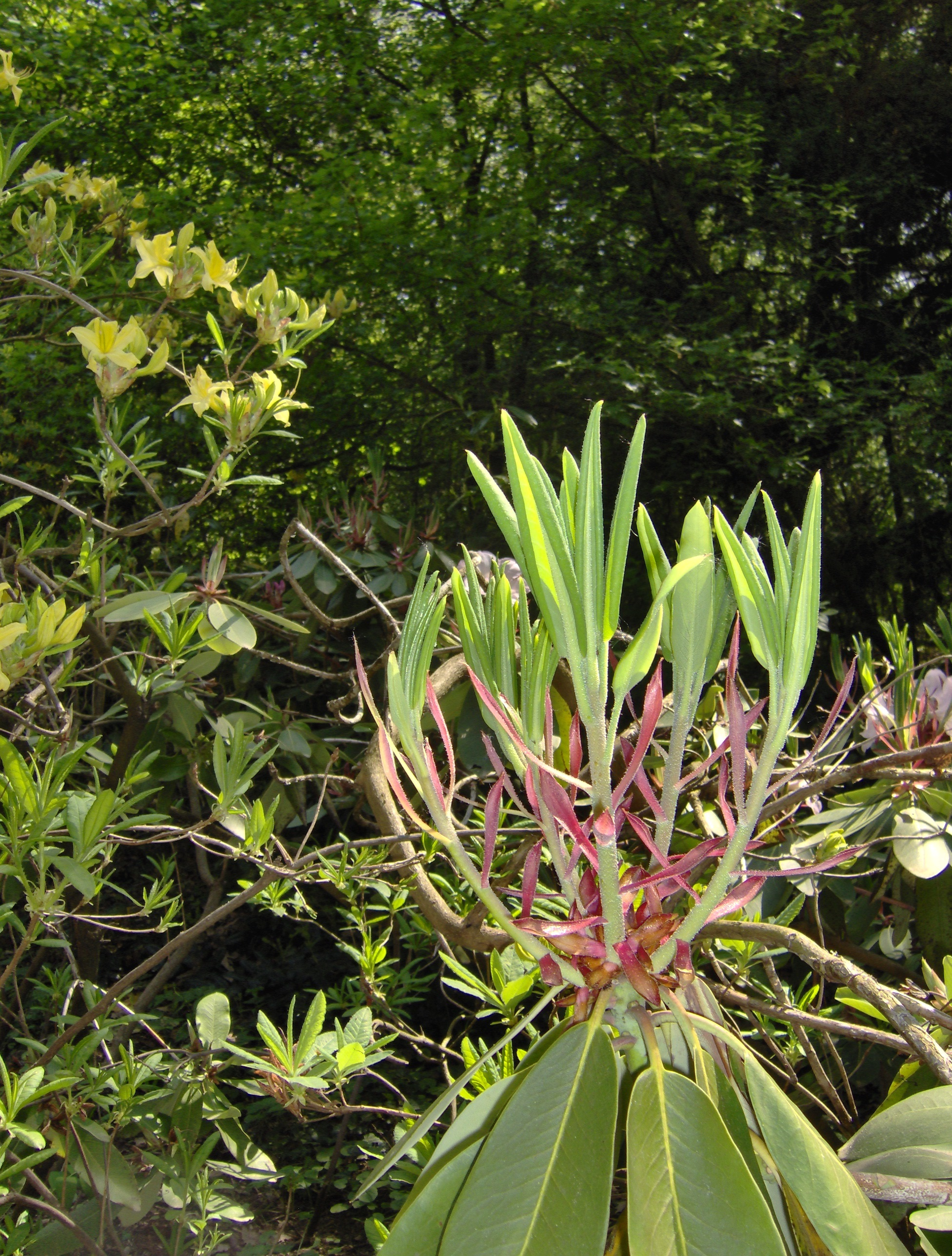

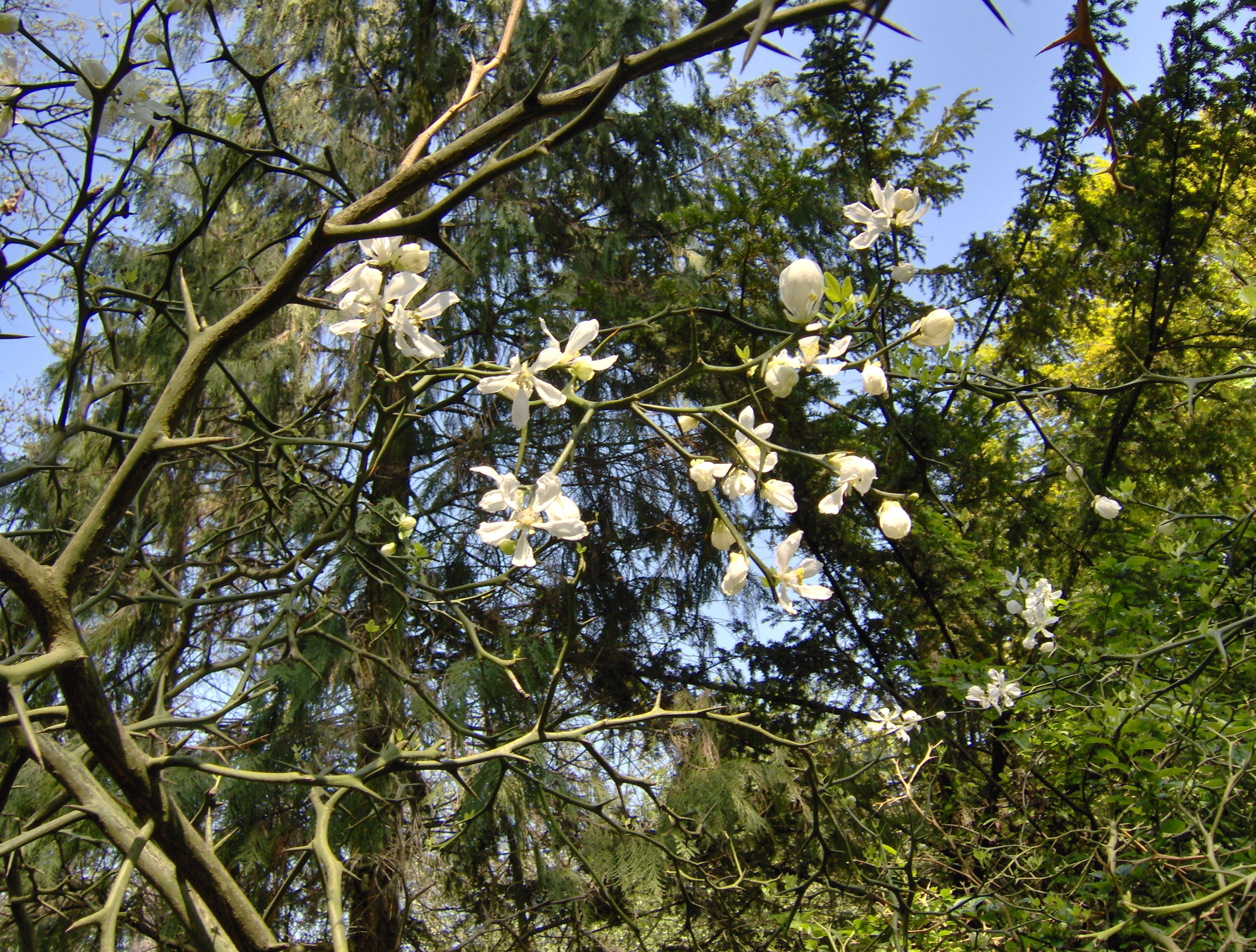

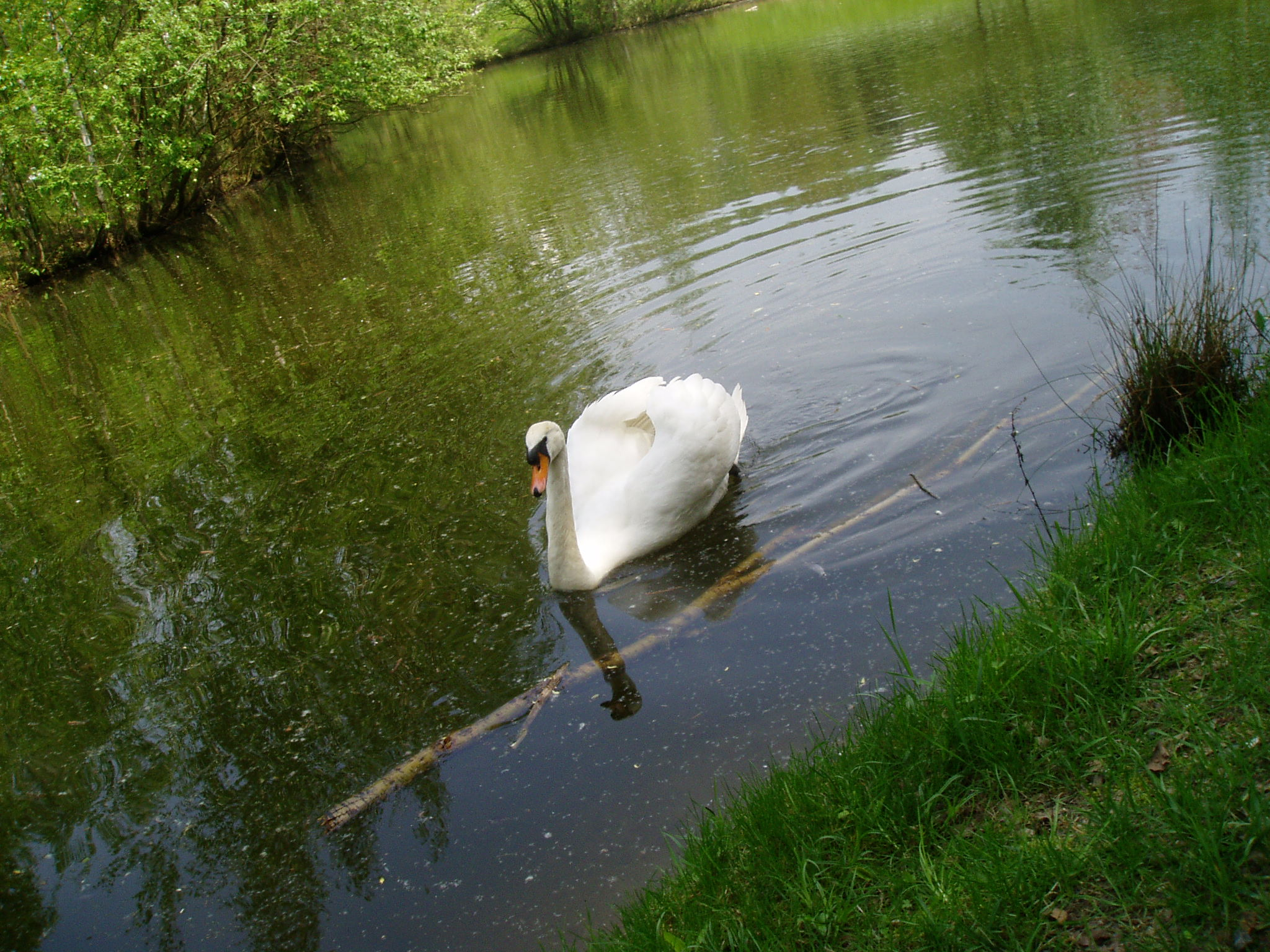

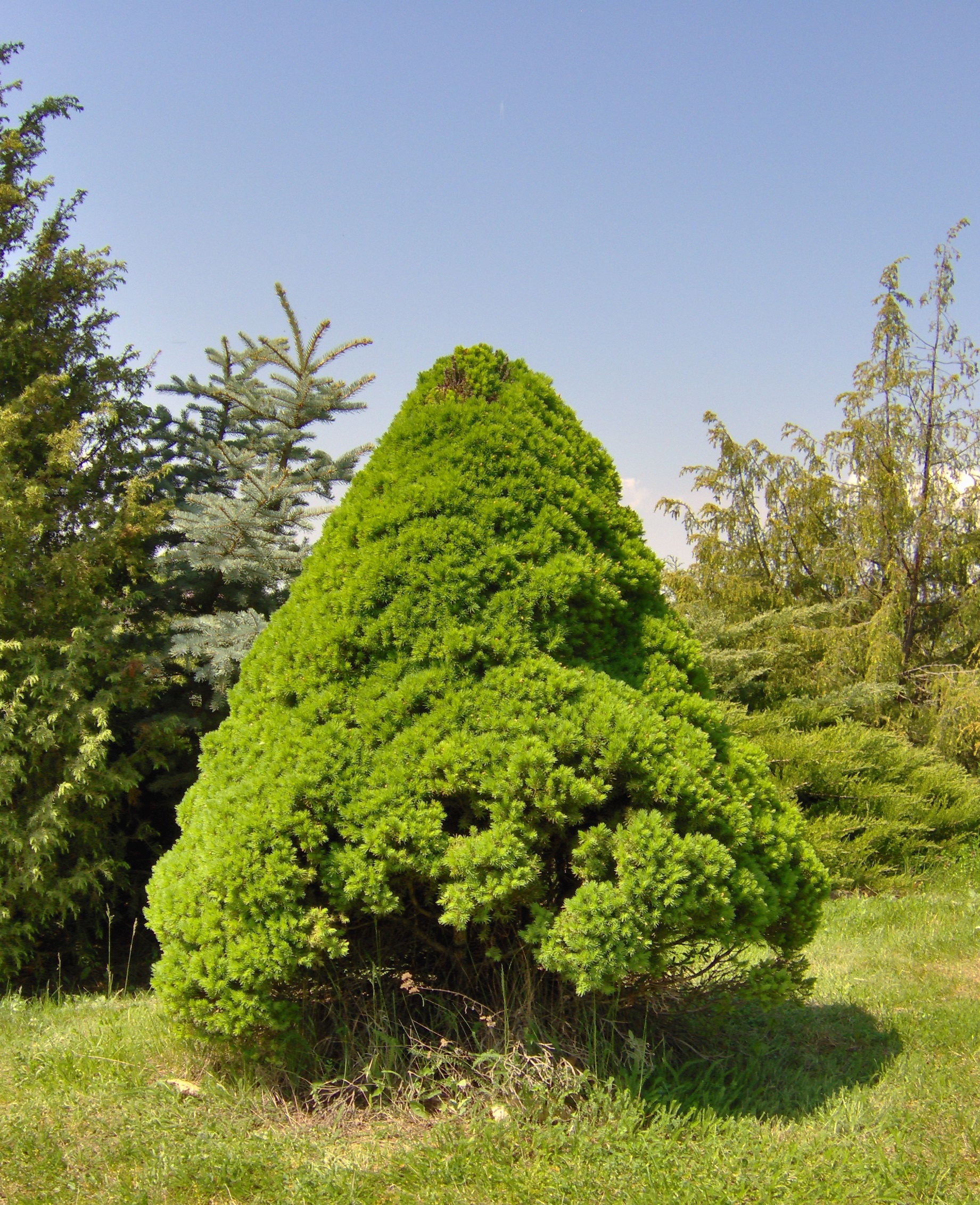

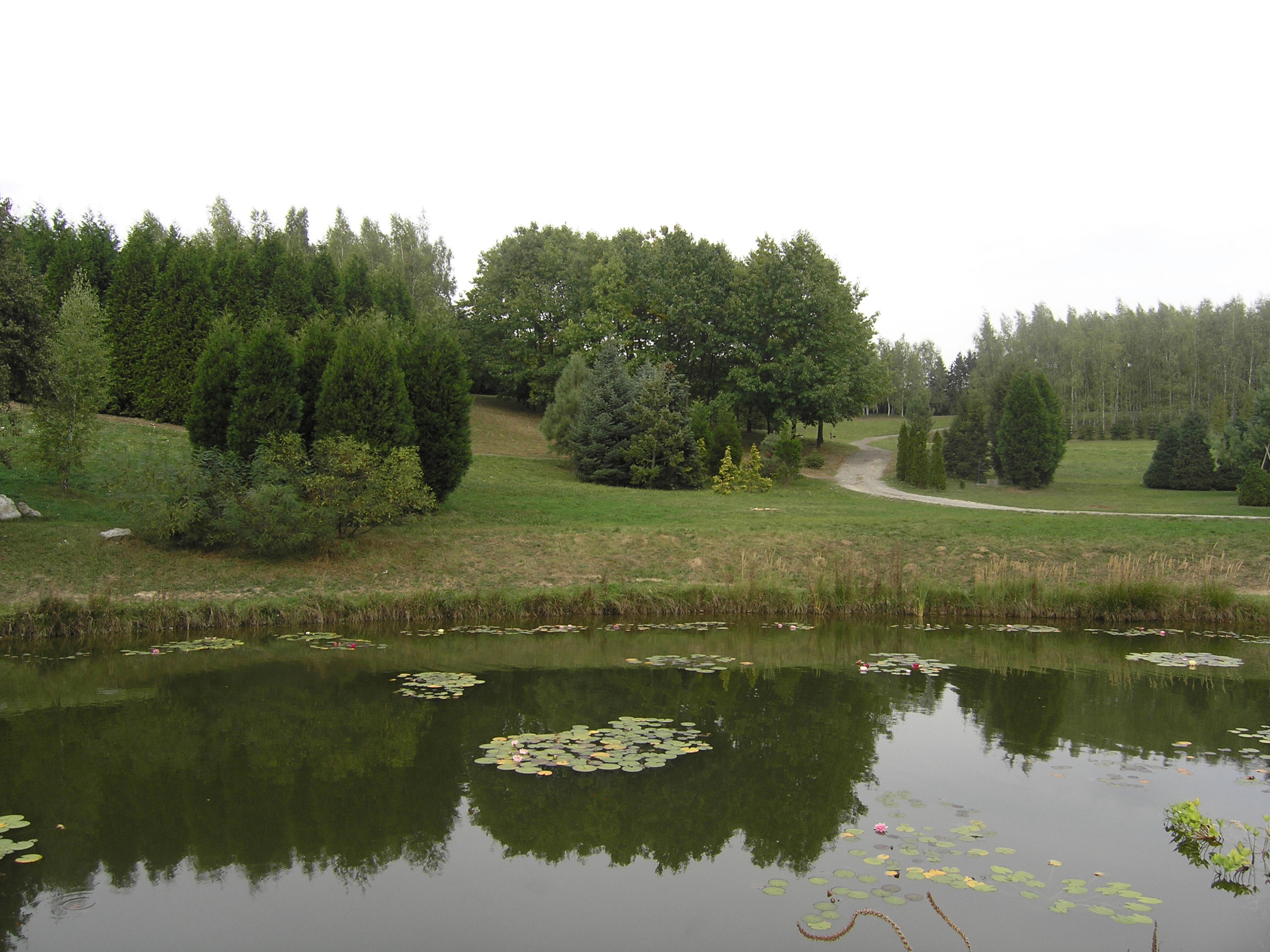

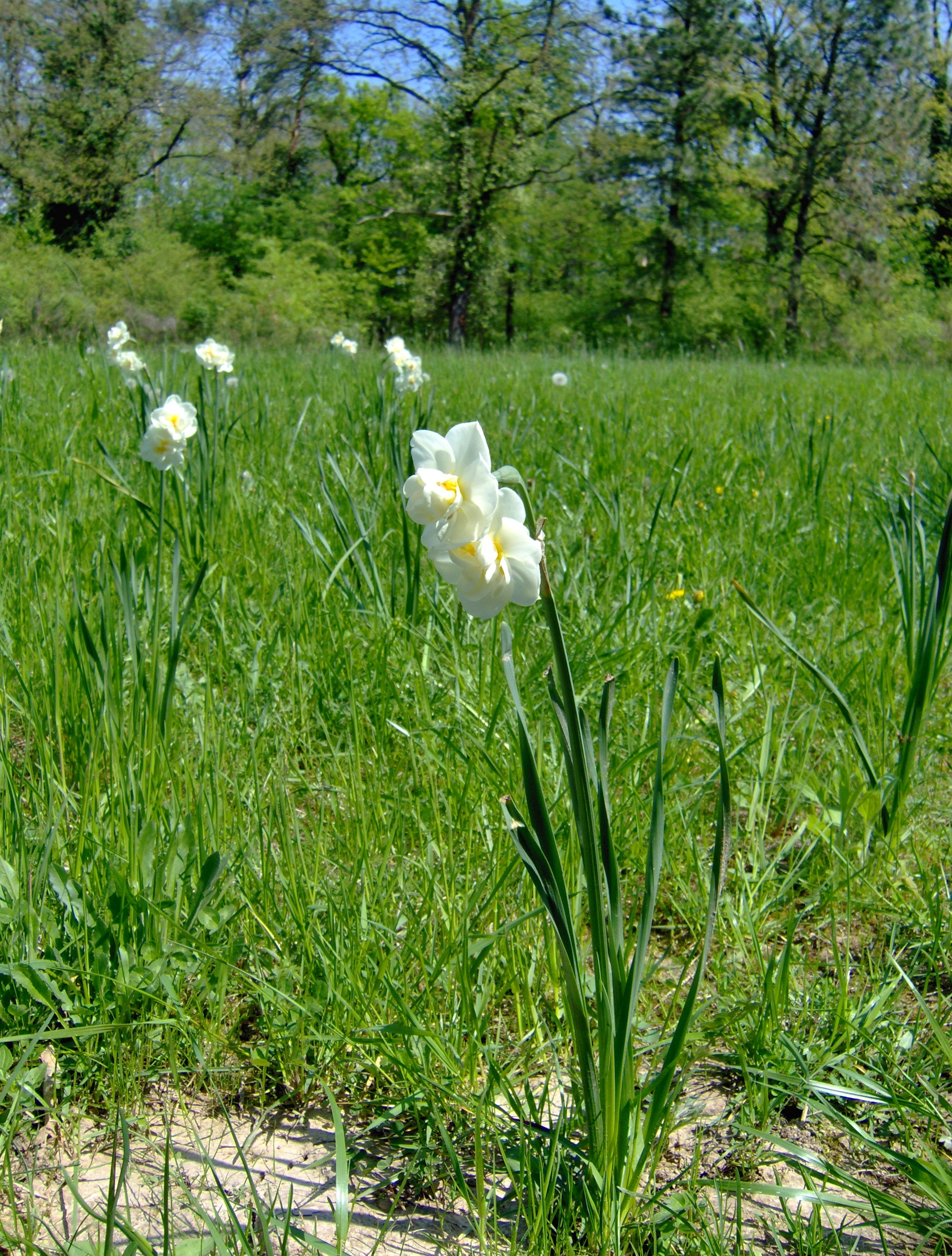

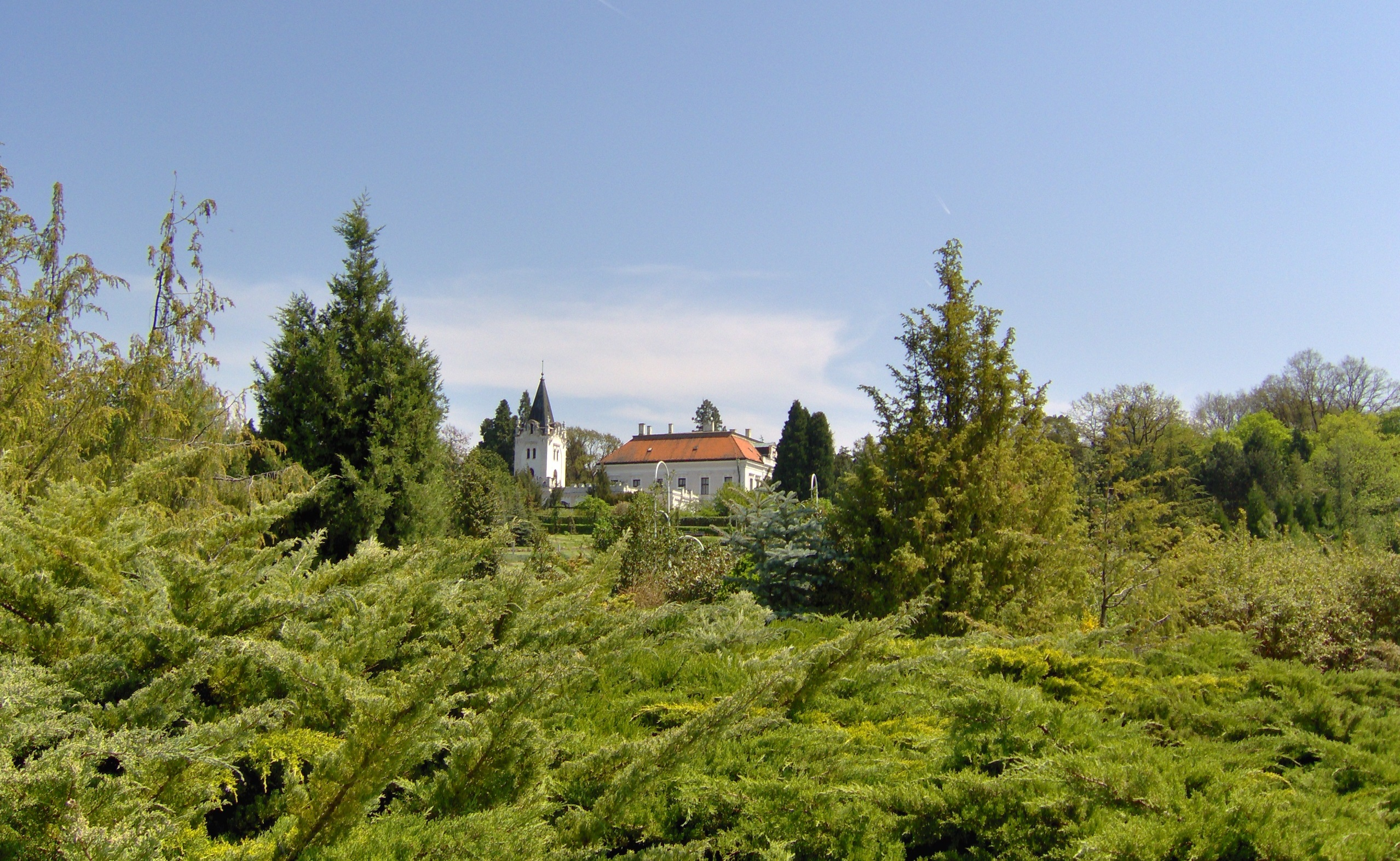

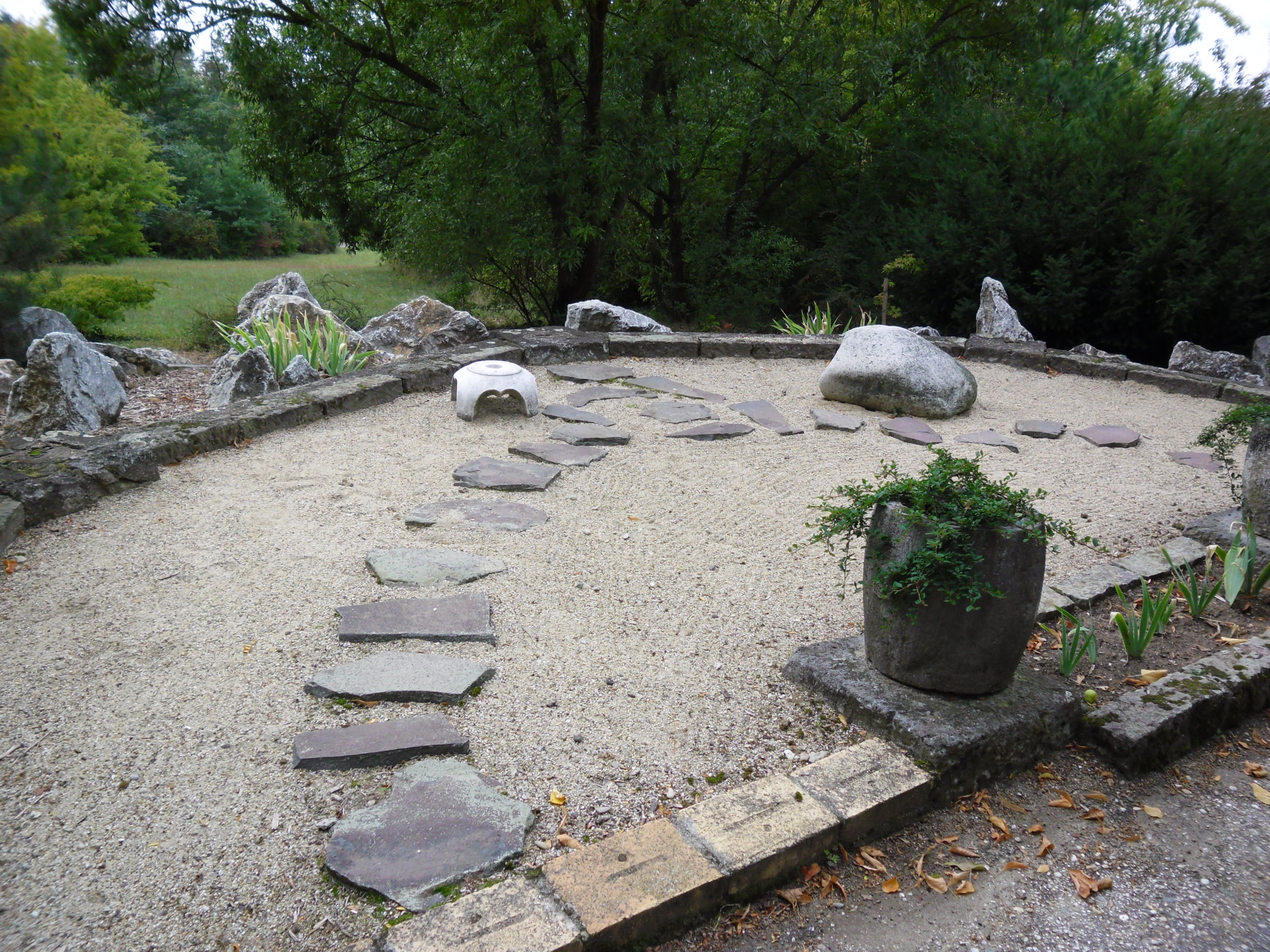

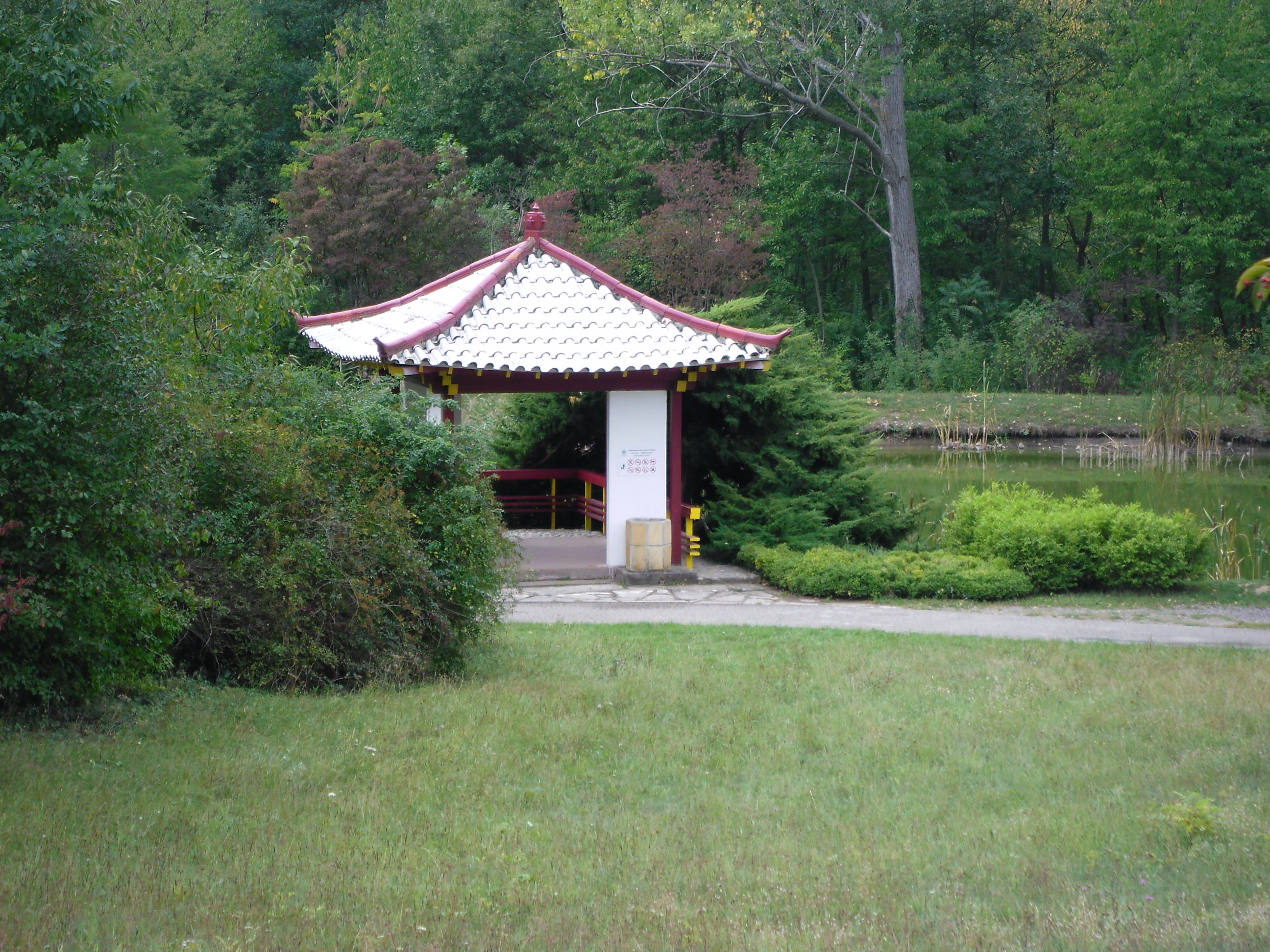

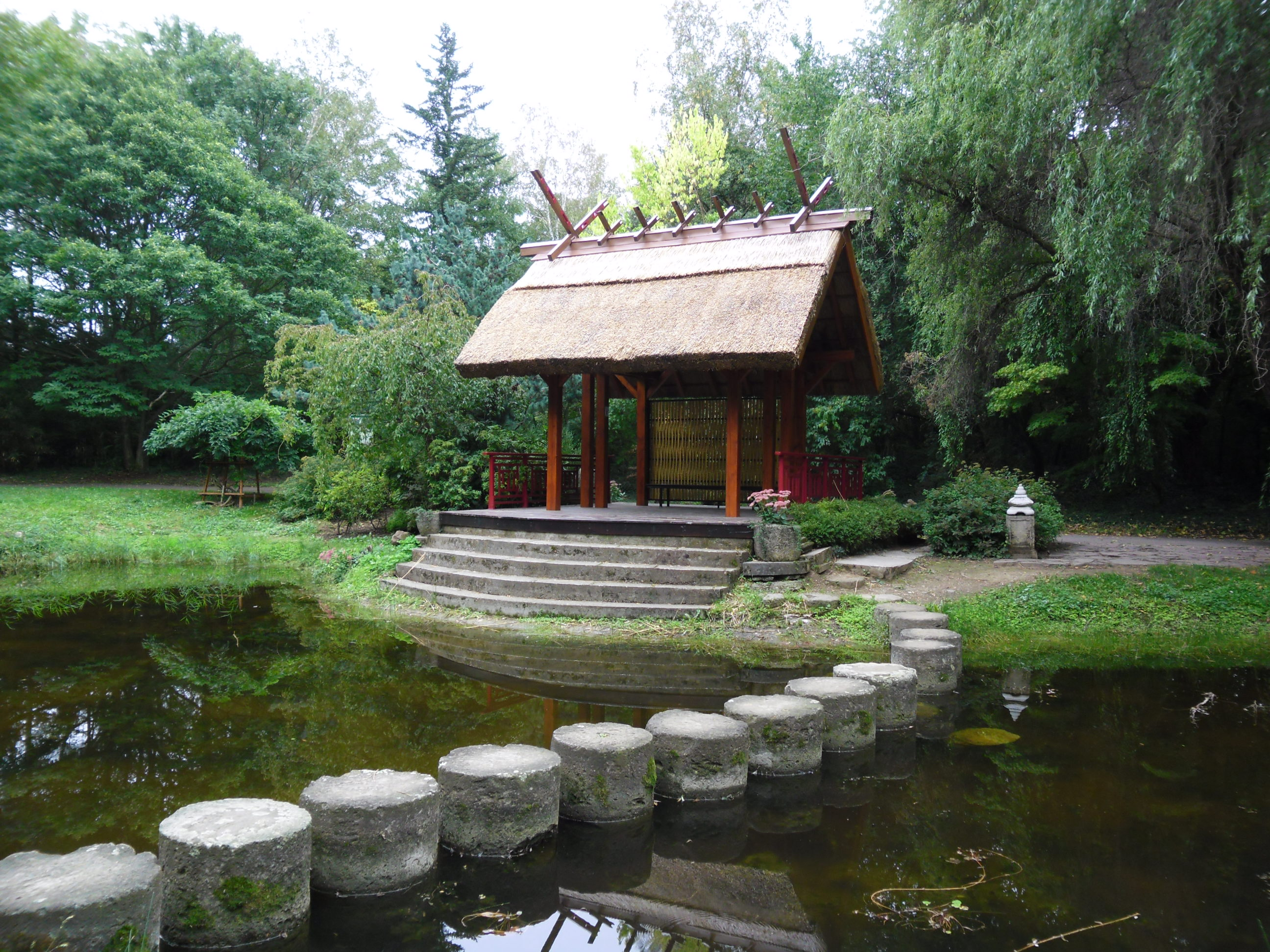

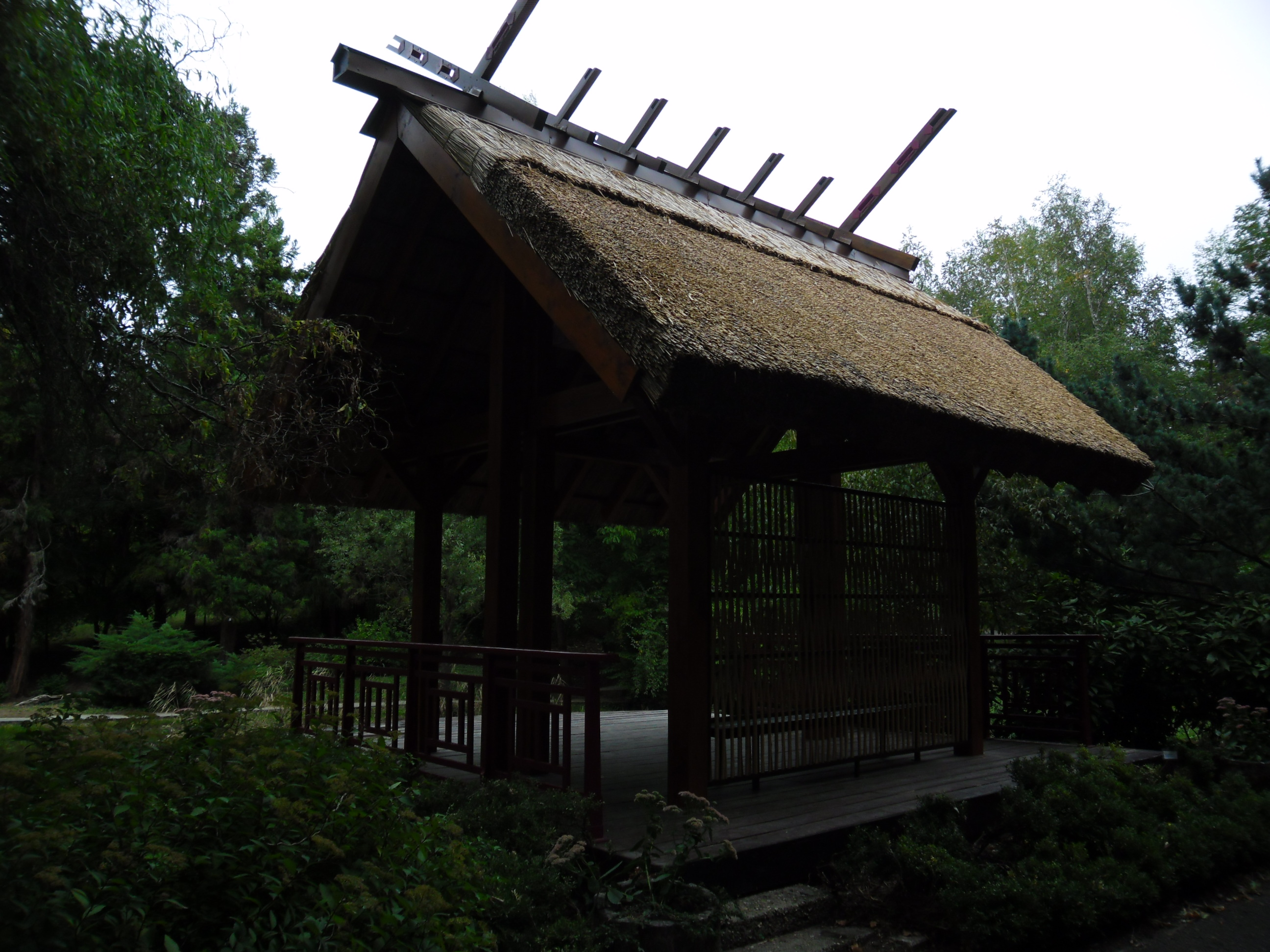

== See also ==
- List of botanical gardens in Slovakia
