= Institute of Political Science of SAS =

Institute of Political Science of the Slovak Academy of Sciences (In Slovak: Ústav politických vied Slovenskej akadémie vied, ÚPV SAV) is a research institute of the Slovak Academy of Sciences.

== History ==
The institute was established in 2002 as a result of transformation of the Institute of Politology of the Slovak Academy of Sciences. Its Director since 1998 has been PhDr. Miroslav Pekník CSc. (born 1950). The actual address of the institute is: Dúbravská cesta 9, Bratislava, Slovakia

== Activity ==
The mission of the institute is a basic research of domestic politics, international relations and recent Slovak political history.

It edited about 50 book publications. The best contactact on an international level it has with partners from Poland and Czech Republic.

The staff of the Institute represents several prominent Slovak and Czech political scientists, historians and lawyers (e.g. Miroslav Peknik, Norbert Kmet, Peter Dinus, Jozef Jablonicky, Jozef Kiss, Oskar Krejci, Daniel Šmihula, Eva Jassova, Juraj Marusiak).
