= Pavol Šajgalík =

Slovak scientist (born 1955)

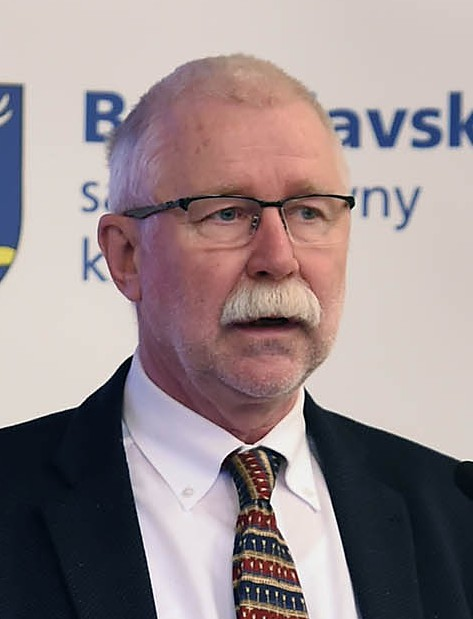
- Šajgalík in 2015
- Born: June 30, 1955 (age 71); Bratislava, Czechoslovakia
- Education: Comenius University
- Children: 2
- Awards: Ľudovít Štúr Order, 3rd class (2015)
- Scientific career
- Fields: Materials science
- Workplaces: Slovak Academy of Sciences

Pavol Šajgalík (born 30 June 1955) is a Slovak physicist, specialized in materials science. He has served as the president of the Slovak Academy of Sciences from 2015 to 2025.

== Biography ==
Pavol Šajgalík was born on 30 June 1955 in Bratislava. He studied physics at the Comenius University, graduating in 1979. Šajgalík was awarded the candidate degree by the Slovak Academy of Sciences in 1987. Since graduation, he has worked at the Institute of Inorganic Chemistry of the Slovak Academy of Sciences. Between 1999 and 2013 he was the director of the institute.

== Awards ==
In 2015, he was awarded the Ľudovít Štúr Order, 3rd class by the president of Slovakia Andrej Kiska.

== Personal life ==
Šajgalík is married and has two daughters.
