= Martin Venhart =

Slovak scientist

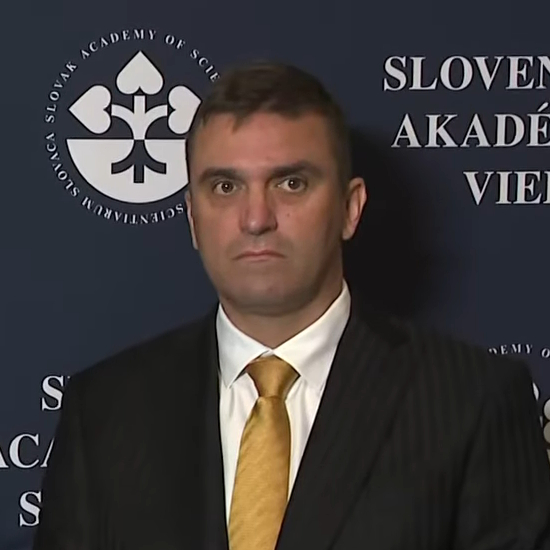
- Venhart in 2026
- Born: Trnava, Czechoslovakia
- Education: Comenius University
- Scientific career
- Fields: Nuclear Physics
- Workplaces: Slovak Academy of Sciences

Martin Venhart is a Slovak nuclear physicist. He specializes in the study of atomic nucleus shapes. Since 2025 he has served as the President of the Slovak Academy of Sciences

== Biography ==
Martin Venhart was born in Trnava. His father worked in the nearby Bohunice Nuclear Power Plant. Although he disliked physics as a subject in primary school, his father persuaded him to pursue studied on nuclear physics, because the specialization opens up good job opportunities at the power plant.

Venhart earned his PhD in Experimental nuclear physics from the Comenius University in 2008. After a two year post-doc at the KU Leuven, he joined the Institute of Physics at the Slovak Academy of Sciences. In 2013, he became the head of the department of Nuclear Physics. In 2017, he was elected a member of the Presidium of the Academy.

In 2011 Venhart designed the first Slovak experiment at the ISOLDE facility at CERN. Venhart is a member of the supervisory board of the University of Trnava.

Following the Russian invasion of Ukraine, Venhart criticized the Slovak nuclear physicist who did not cease their cooperation with the Russian Institute for Nuclear Research. In spite of his physics background, Venhart considers social sciences the most important scientific disciplines in the 21st century because he consider overcoming social polarisation the most crucial challenge for the humankind.

== Awards ==
Venhart was awarded the Eset Science Award in 2024.
