= Institute of Chemistry, Slovak Academy of Sciences =

Research institute in Bratislava, Slovakia

The Institute of Chemistry, Slovak Academy of Sciences (Slovak: Chemický ústav Slovenskej akadémie vied) is a research institute in Bratislava, Slovakia, and part of the Slovak Academy of Sciences. Its work is centered on the chemistry and biochemistry of saccharides, including glycobiology, carbohydrate synthesis, glycan analysis, and yeast research. Since 2022 it has operated as a public research institution.

== History ==
The institute celebrated its 70th anniversary in 2023. It is housed at Dúbravská cesta 9 in the Bratislava campus of the Slovak Academy of Sciences. The present building was designed in 1960 by architect Karol Palus and completed in 1962; according to the Register of modern architecture in Slovakia, it was among the first buildings erected in the academy complex and was restored in 2008.

One of the chemists most closely associated with the institute was Vojtech Bílik, who worked there from 1961 to 1992. A 2025 review in Chemical Papers linked his institute research to the development of the Mo(VI)-catalyzed aldose epimerization known as the Bílik reaction and described the process as one of the institute's most important routes for producing rare aldoses for research and commercial use.

== Research ==
According to the academy's information page, the institute's research is focused on the chemistry and biochemistry of saccharides. Its stated fields include the synthesis and structural study of mono- and oligosaccharides, polysaccharide chemistry, the mechanism of glycanases, physicochemical methods for carbohydrate analysis, glycobiotechnology, and the ecology, taxonomy and phylogeny of yeasts and yeast-like fungi.

The institute's 2023 annual report also described work on glycomic biomarkers, lectin-based microarrays, biosensors, plant biochemistry and carbohydrate-based diagnostics. The same report recorded two Slovak patent applications filed in 2023, one for a lectin-panel method for detecting congenital disorders of glycosylation and another for a screen-printed carbon electrochemical sensor developed with partner institutions. The peer-reviewed journal Chemical Papers is published on behalf of the institute.

== Collections and conferences ==
The institute maintains the Culture Collection of Yeasts (CCY 333), which is registered in the world catalogue of cultures, belongs to the World Federation for Culture Collections and the European Culture Collections' Organisation, and serves as an international depository for patent strains. In 2023 the collection held about 4,000 yeast and yeast-like microbial strains, including about 340 type cultures and patent-protected strains.

Through its yeast research group, the institute is one of the organizers of the Annual Conference on Yeasts, a series that grew out of the Czechoslovak Commission on Yeasts founded in 1964 and is described by its organizers as one of the oldest scientific events in Slovakia and Europe. It also organizes the Bratislava Symposium on Saccharides, an international meeting that has been held regularly since 1978 at Smolenice Castle.
