= Institute of Inorganic Chemistry Slovak Academy of Sciences =

Institute of the Slovak Academy of Sciences

- Ústav anorganickej chémie Slovenskej akadémie vied
- Established: 1953
- Director: Ing. Peter Tatarko, PhD.
- Administrative staff: 75
- Doctoral students: 13
- Location: (Slovakia) Bratislava, Slovakia; 48.1688741°N 17.0700497°E
- Website: www.uach.sav.sk/

Institute of Inorganic Chemistry Slovak Academy of Sciences (IIC SAS; Ústav anorganickej chémie Slovenskej akadémie vied) belongs to Scientific Section 2, Biological and Chemical Sciences of Slovak Academy of Sciences.

== History ==
Institute of Inorganic Chemistry was founded in November 1952 as Commission of Inorganic chemistry by Board of Commissioners. Later, on 30 November 1953, the name was changed to Laboratory of Inorganic chemistry. The laboratory became a part of Institute of Chemical technology of Organic Compounds on 1 January 1955. Independent Institute of Inorganic Chemistry was founded on 1 January 1960 by the decision of the presidium of SAS. The institute became member of Scientific Collegium of Chemistry SAS and Scientific Collegium of Organic Chemistry and Biochemistry CSAS from 1 January 1962 until 31 March 1990. The institute has become an independent part of Slovak Academy of Sciencies since 1 April 1990.

The number of employees has grown considerably over the years: from 7 in 1953, through 36 in 1958, 1965 – 70, 1970 – 100 and in 1980 103 employees worked for the institute. The number decreased slightly to 95 in 2014.

== Research ==
Initially, the research was focused on industrial demands, mainly on the aluminium production and the processing of raw inorganic materials; i. e. bentonites, refractory materials, cements, etc.

The research is currently concentrated on studying:

- relations between composition, properties, and structure of inorganic materials, e. g. progressive ceramics, molten systems, and clay minerals and its modified forms
- the thermodynamics of multicomponent systems
- the chemical reactions occurring in inorganic systems, including the phase boundaries
- the development and application of theoretical and experimental methods for structure determination and properties of matter.

== Departments ==
The institute is divided into 5 research departments.

=== Department of Ceramics ===
- Head: doc. Ing. Miroslav Hnatko, PhD.
- research is focused on the relations between mechanical properties and microstructure of oxide or non-oxide ceramic nanocomposites, etc.
- preparation of new types of composites (ceramic composites with high electrical and/or thermal conductivity, corrosion and oxidation resistant materials, luminescent materials, etc.).

=== Department of Hydrosilicates ===
- Head: Ing. Helena Pálková, PhD.
- the studies of the properties, mineralogical and chemical composition of the fine fractions of raw materials – bentonites – the clays containing dominantly montmorillonite or other minerals of the smectite group
- chemical modifications and partial dissolution of montmorillonites have been studied by mainly spectroscopic methods
- novel hybrid materials based on cationic dyes and clay minerals exhibit many interesting properties, such as excitation energy transfer, photosensitization, changes of the energy of absorbed and emitted light, optical anisotropy, etc.

=== Department of Molten Systems ===
- Head: Ing. František Šimko, PhD.
- the research is aimed to physico-chemical properties of molten salts systems
- in order to understand better the relations between the properties, the composition, and the structure of inorganic melts, several parameters are studied, i. e. density, viscosity, electric conductivity, phase equilibria, and surface tension
- applied research is focused on solar energy accumulation, optimization of conditions for aluminium electrochemical production; then transport of heat where molten salts act as cooling media (nuclear power plants), etc.

=== Department of Theoretical Chemistry ===
- Head: Mgr. Stanislav Komorovský, PhD.
- research based on the development of computational methods for treating electron correlation in molecules and solids
- computational studies of NMR and EPR parameters of organometallic, biologically and catalytically active substances
- the most importantly, combining of experimental methods (vibrational spectroscopy, neutron and X-ray structure analysis) with precise DFT calculations in the solid state.

=== Vitrum Laugaricio (Joint Glass Center) ===
- Head: prof. Ing. Dušan Galusek, DrSc.
- the research covers mostly the study of processing, microstructure, and properties of polycrystalline ceramic materials and the relation between structure, composition, and properties of oxide glasses
- the development and optimalisation of new glasses for industrial applications, and corrosion of glasses by aqueous media; then polycrystalline alumina-based materials, especially liquid phase sintered (LPS) aluminas, etc.

== List of directors ==
- 1953 – 1963: Mikuláš Gregor
- 1963 – 1970: František Hanic
- 1970 – 1982: Edmund Kanclíř
- 1982 – 1990: Miroslav Zikmund
- 1990 – 1991: Blahoslav Čičel
- 1991 – 1995: Vladimír Daněk
- 1995 – 1999: Jozef Noga
- 1999 – 2013: Pavol Šajgalík
- 2013 – 2026: Miroslav Boča
- since 2026: Peter Tatarko
