= Tesárske Mlyňany =

Tesárske Mlyňany Taszármalonya
- Municipality
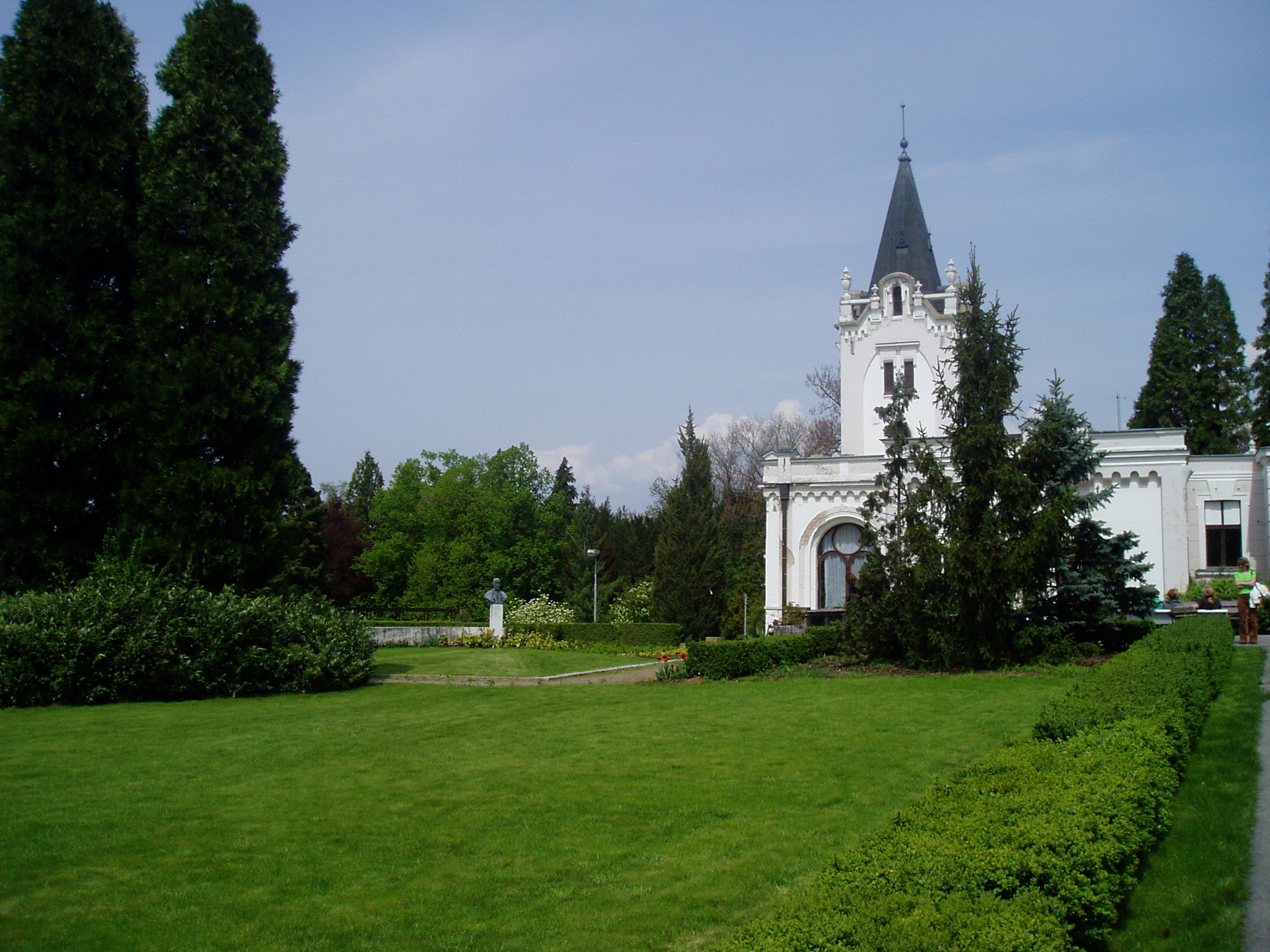
- Arboretum Mlyňany

- Flag

- Location of Tesárske Mlyňany in the Nitra Region Location of Tesárske Mlyňany in Slovakia
- Coordinates: 48.35°N 18.36°E
- Country: Slovakia
- Region: Nitra Region
- District: Zlaté Moravce District
- First mentioned: 1075

Area
  - Total: 18.00 km^{2} (6.95 sq mi)
- Elevation: 168 m (551 ft)

Population (2025)
  - Total: 1,780
- Time zone: UTC+1 (CET)
  - Summer (DST): UTC+2 (CEST)
- Postal code: 951 76
- Area code: +421 37
- Vehicle registration plate (until 2022): ZM
- Website: www.tesarskemlynany.sk

Tesárske Mlyňany (Hungarian: Taszármalonya) is a village and municipality in Zlaté Moravce District of the Nitra Region, in western-central Slovakia.

== History ==
The town was originally formed by association of two previously separate villages, Tesáre nad Žitavou and Mlynany. Tesárske means Carpenter and so its name means Carpenter over the Zittau River and is among the oldest settlements in the region, first recorded as a settlement of Tazzari in 1075AD although Archaeological findings show settlement since the 9th century. Mlynany is first recorded as Malonian in 1209AD. Both names come from craft focus of its inhabitants.

== Geography ==
The village lies in the Zittau upland, on both banks of the Zittau river, about 4 km south of the town of Zlaté Moravce. Nitra is the nearest large town. The village is accessed by the R1 expressway and I/65 road, leading north-south. The area size us 18 km² The municipality lies at an altitude of 168 metres (551 ft) and covers an area of 18.00 km^{2} (6.95 sq mi) (2025).

== Population ==
Population statistic (10 years)
Year	1995	2005	2015	2025
Count	1671	1666	1783	1780
Difference		−0.29%	+7.02%	−0.16%

Population statistic
Year	2024	2025
Count	1798	1780
Difference		−1.00%

It has a population of 1780 people (31 December 2025).

=== Ethnicity ===
Census 2021 (1+ %)
Ethnicity	Number	Fraction
Slovak	1618	91.87%
Not found out	134	7.6%
Total	1761	

In year 2021 was 1761 people by ethnicity 1618 as Slovak, 134 as Not found out, 10 as Czech, 7 as Russian, 6 as Hungarian, 5 as Other, 2 as Rusyn, 2 as Austrian, 1 as Jewish, 1 as Turkish, 1 as Romani and 1 as Romanian.

Note on population: The difference values of population numbers in the table "Population statistic" and in the sections "Ethnicity" & "Religion" is caused by the use of various statistical methods.

=== Religion ===
Census 2021 (1+ %)
Religion	Number	Fraction
Roman Catholic Church	1338	75.98%
None	239	13.57%
Not found out	141	8.01%
Total	1761	

In year 2021 was 1761 people by religion 1338 from Roman Catholic Church, 239 from None, 141 from Not found out, 10 from Other and not ascertained christian church, 10 from Christian Congregations in Slovakia, 6 from Greek Catholic Church, 5 from Evangelical Church, 4 from Other, 2 from Eastern Orthodox Church, 2 from Islam, 1 from Old Catholic Church, 1 from Paganism and natural spirituality, 1 from Jehovah's Witnesses and 1 from Ad hoc movements.

== Sister Cities ==
- (Czech Republic) Zborovice, Czechia
- Kétsoprony, Hungary

== Culture and attractions ==
- Arboretum Mlyňany Slovak Academy of Sciences
- Roman Catholic Church of the Annunciation from 1763.
- Chapel of the Exaltation. Crisis of 1841.
- Granary - church Aniel
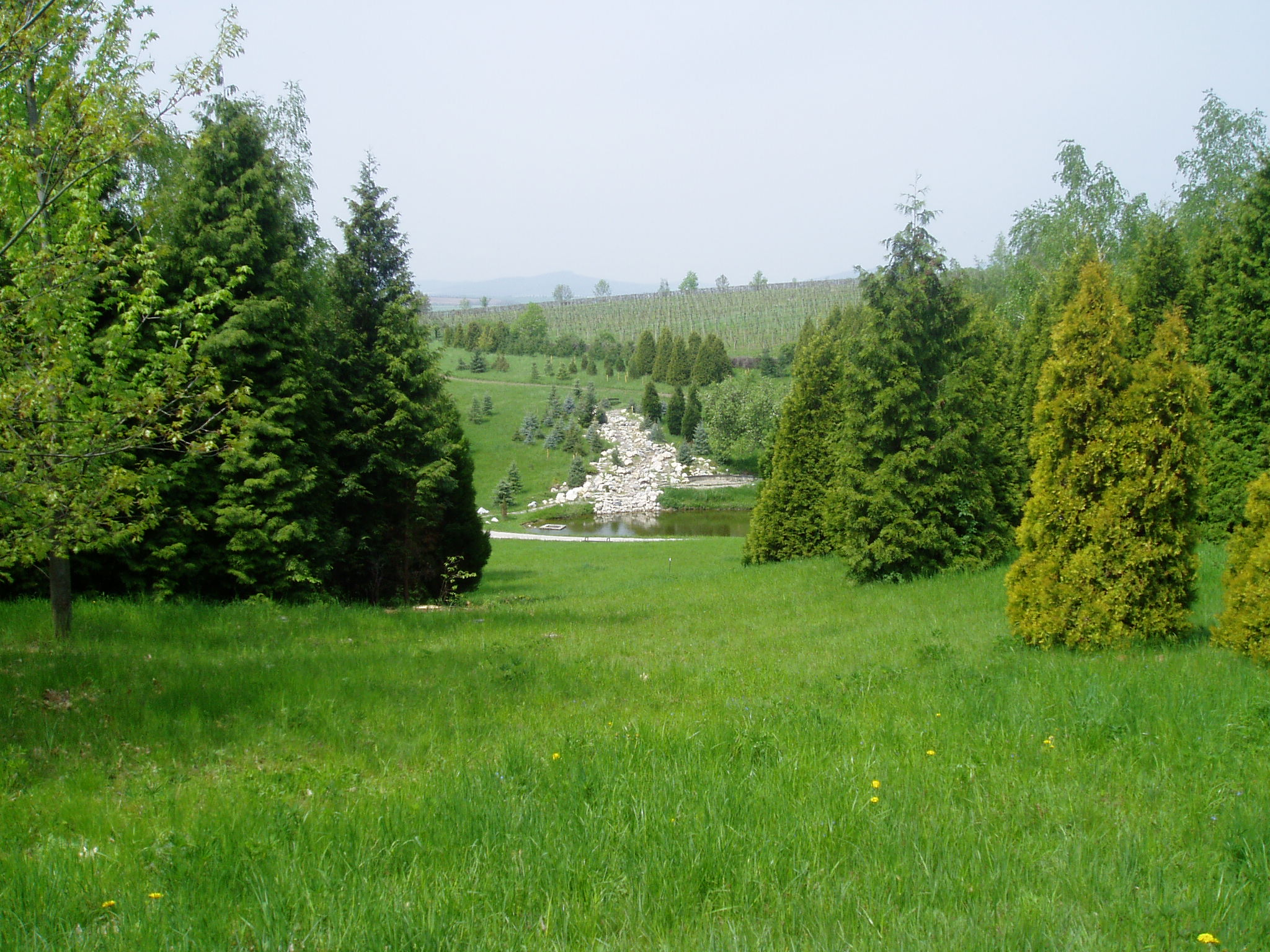
Arboretum

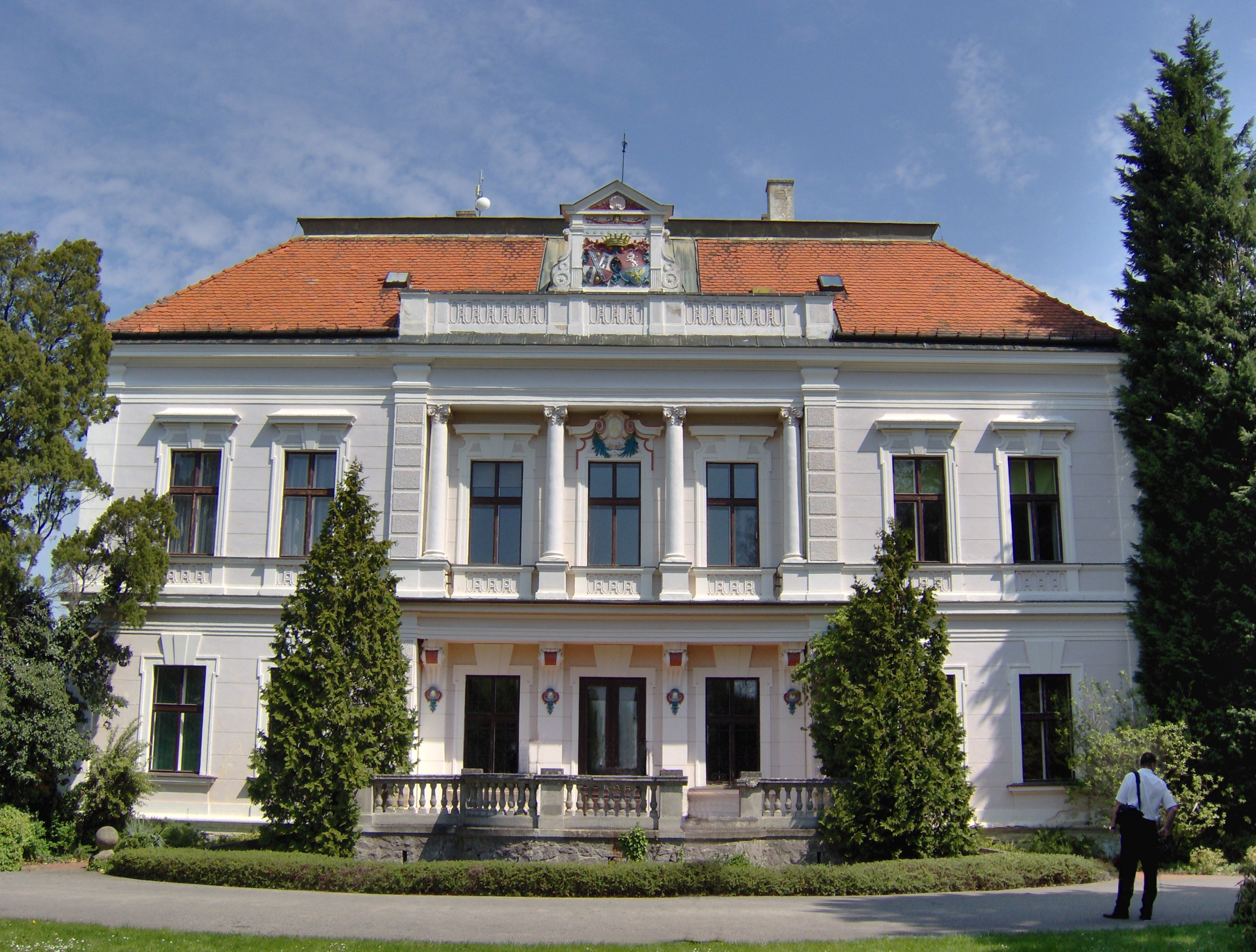
Ambrózy manor

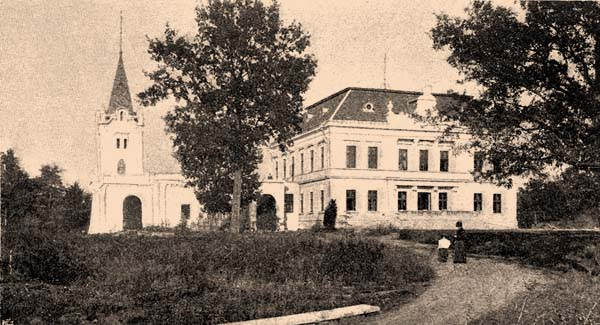
Malonya-Migazzi.jpg
