= Oskar Krejčí =

Czech political scientist and author

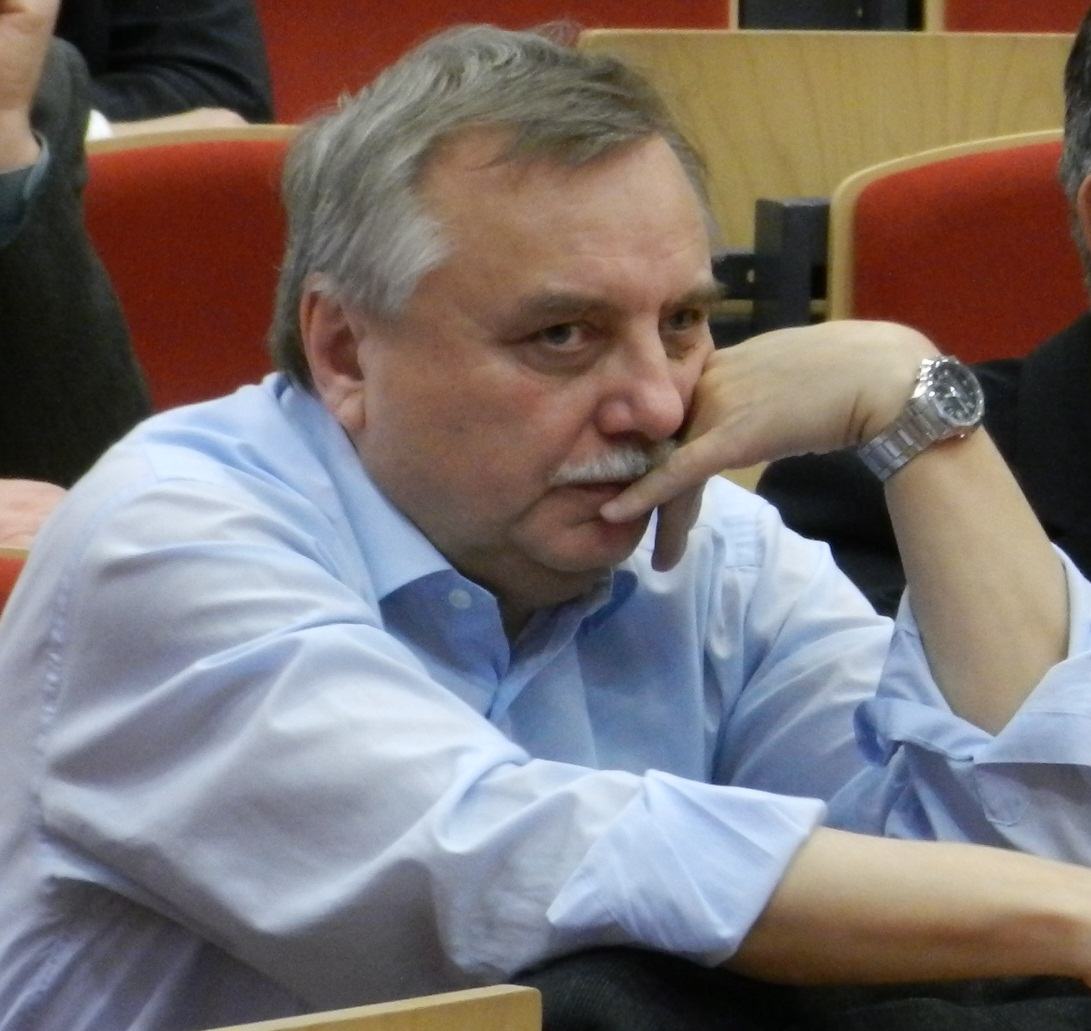
Oskar Krejčí on the international symposium about Problems of the Intelligence Services in an Open Society (Bratislava, 2011)

Oskar Krejčí (born 13 July 1948 in Prague) is a Czech political scientist, who is the author of approximately thirty books and more than thousand articles in the area of political science.

Krejčí is a director of the Institute of the Global Studies of The Jan Amos Komensky University Prague, Czech Republic.

In 1967 he was convicted for an attempt illegal crossing Czechoslovak-Austrian border to a suspended sentence of 14 months. In 1968 Krejčí entered the Communist Party of Czechoslovakia. Since 1975 until the end of communist regime he was a secret agent of the StB, the Czechoslovak secret service. In this position he also supervised other agents.

Before and during the Velvet Revolution he was an adviser to two last Communist Prime Ministers of Czechoslovakia – Ladislav Adamec and Marián Čalfa. He is author of the address of the Prime Minister in whereby was in the Federal Assembly of ČSSR designed on president Václav Havel and author of the program of the federal government of the national understanding.

He is a vocal critic of the plans of the Bush administration to install a national missile defense system on the territory of the Czech Republic and Poland.

== Books ==
- KREJČÍ, Oskar: Vybrané komentáře. Díl 5. Praha: Argument OVIA z.s., 2026. 321 s. ISBN 978-80-907365-9-7
- KREJČÍ, Oskar: Geopolitika střední Evropy. Pohled z Prahy a Bratislavy. Praha: Professional Publishing, s.r.o., 2025. 496 s. ISBN 978-80-88260-81-3
- KREJČÍ, Oskar: Komentáře a rozhovory. Díl 4. Praha: Argument OVIA z.s., 2023. 307 s. ISBN 978-80-907365-8-0
- KREJČÍ, Oskar: War (Válka). Třetí, aktualizované a rozšířené vydání. Praha: Professional Publishing, 2022. 190 s. ISBN 978-80-88260-61-5
- KREJČÍ, Oskar: Geopolitics of the China. (Geopolitika Číny.) Praha: Professional Publishing, s.r.o., 2021. 492 s. ISBN 978-80-88260-51-6
- KREJČÍ, Oskar: International Politics (Mezinárodní politika.) 6. upravené vydání. Praha: Ekopress, 2021. 804 s. ISBN 978-80-87865-63-7
- KREJČÍ, Oskar: Comments and interviews Tom 3. (Komentáře a rozhovory. Díl 3.). Praha: Argument OVIA z.s., 2020. 222 s. ISBN 978-80-907365-5-9 – Elektronická verze knihy
- KREJČÍ, Oskar: Comments and interviews Tom 2. (Komentáře a rozhovory. Díl 2.). Praha: Argument OVIA z.s., 2019. 226 s. ISBN 978-80-907365-3-5 – Electronic version
- Velvet Revolution. (Sametová revoluce). Druhé vydání. Praha: Professional Publishing, 2019. 160 s. ISBN 978-80-88260-37-0
- KREJČÍ, Oskar: Comments and interviews Tom 1. (Komentáře a rozhovory. Díl 1.). Praha: Argument OVIA z.s., 2018. 115 s. ISBN 978-80-907365-0-4 – Electronic version
- KREJČÍ, Oskar: Geopolitics of the Russia. (Geopolitika Ruska.) Praha: Professional Publishing, s.r.o., 2017. 534 pp. ISBN 978-80-906594-9-0
- KREJČÍ, Oskar: Geopolitics of the Central European Region. The view from Prague and Bratislava (Geopolitika středoevropského prostoru. Pohled z Prahy a Bratislavy.) 5. upravené vydání. Prague: Professional Publishing, 2016. 426 pp. ISBN 978-80-7431-161-1
- KREJČÍ, Oskar: International Politics (Mezinárodní politika.) 5. upravené vydání. Praha: Ekopress, 2014. 804 pp. ISBN 978-80-87865-07-1
- KREJČÍ, Oskar: Velvet Revolution. (Sametová revoluce). Praha: Professional Publishing, 2014. 160 p. ISBN 978-80-7431-138-3
- KREJČÍ, Oskar: Human Rights. (Lidská práva). Praha: Professional Publishing, 2011. 175 s. ISBN 978-80-7431-056-0
- KREJČÍ, Oskar: War. (Válka). Druhé, upravené vydání. Praha: Professional Publishing, 2011. 175 s. ISBN 978-80-7431-063-8
- КРЕЙЧИ, Oскар: Геополитика Центральной Европы. Взгляд из Праги и Братиславы. Москва – Пpaгa: Научная книга (ISBN 978-5-91393-048-4), Ottovo nakladatelství (ISBN 978-80-7451-015-1), 2010. 424 pp.
- KREJČÍ, Oskar: War. (Válka). Praha: Professional Publishing, 2010. 170 s. ISBN 978-80-7431-029-4
- KREJČÍ, Oskar: Geopolitika středoevropského prostoru. Pohled z Prahy a Bratislavy. Čtvrté, doplněné vydání. Praha: Professional Publishing, 2010. 400 pp. ISBN 978-80-7431-018-8
- KREJČÍ, Oskar: International Politics (Mezinárodní politika.) 4. aktualizované vydání. Praha: Ekopress, 2010. 752 pp. ISBN 978-80-86929-60-6
- KREJČÍ, Oskar: Geopolitics of the Central European Region. The view from Prague and Bratislava (Geopolitika středoevropského prostoru. Pohled z Prahy a Bratislavy.) Prague: Professional Publishing, 2009. 400 pp. ISBN 978-80-7431-001-0
- KREJČÍ, Oskar: U.S. Foreign Policy (Zahraniční politika USA.) Prague: Professional Publishing, 2009. 437 pp. ISBN 978-80-86946-68-9
- KREJČÍ, Oskar: International Politics (Mezinárodní politika.) Prague: Ekopress, 2007. 744 pp. ISBN 978-80-86929-21-7
- KREJČÍ, Oskar: New Book about Elections. (Nová kniha o volbách.) Prague: Professional Publishing, 2006. 484 pp. ISBN 80-86946-01-0
- KREJČÍ, Oskar: Geopolitics of the Central European Region. The view from Prague and Bratislava] Bratislava: Veda, 2005. 494 pp. (Free download, in English) ISBN 80-224-0852-2 (ISBN 978-8-0224-0852-3)
- KREJČÍ, Oskar: Political Psychology (Politická psychologie.) Prague: Ekopress, 2004. 320 pp. ISBN 80-86119-84-X
- KREJČÍ, Oskar: International Politics (Mezinárodní politika.) Prague: Ekopress, 2001. 712 pp. ISBN 80-86119-45-9
- KREJČÍ, Oskar: The Geopolitics of Central Europe (Geopolitika středoevropského prostoru. Horizonty zahraniční politiky České republiky a Slovenské republiky.) Prague: Ekopress, 2000. 320 pp. ISBN 80-86119-29-7
- KREJČÍ, Oskar: The Nature of Today’s Crisis. (Povaha dnešní krize.) Prague: East Publishing, 1998. 224 pp.
- KREJČÍ, Oskar: International Politics (Mezinárodní politika.) Prague: Victoria Publishing, 1997. 512 pp.
- KREJČÍ, Oskar: Czechoslovak National Interest. Boulder: East European Monographs, 1996, 362 pp. ISBN 0-88033-343-X
- KREJČÍ, Oskar: History of Election in Bohemia and Moravia. Boulder: East European Monographs, 1995, 472 pp. ISBN 0-88033-330-8
- KREJČÍ, Oskar: Book about Elections (Kniha o volbách.) Prague: Victoria Publishing, 1994. 354 pp.
- KREJČÍ, Oskar: Czech National Interest and Geopolitics. (Český národní zájem a geopolitika.) Prague: Universe, 1993. 180 pp.
- KREJČÍ, Oskar: Who Will Win Elections '92 (Kdo vyhraje volby '92.) Prague: Ucho, 1992. 144 pp.
- Why This Crack: About Democracy And Velvet Revolution. (Hovory o demokracii a „sametové revoluci“.) Prague: Trio, 1991. 144 pp.
- KREJČÍ, Oskar: USA and Balance of Power. (USA a mocenská rovnováha.) Prague: Svoboda, 1989. 352 pp.
- KREJČÍ, Oskar: American Conservatism. (Americký konservatismus.) Prague: Svoboda – Pravda, 1987. 262 pp.
- KREJČÍ, Oskar: Technological Illusions. (Technologické iluze. Ke kritice teorií stadií růstu.) Prague: Academia, 1986. 184 pp.
