= Slovak Academy of Sciences =

Scientific and research institution in Slovakia

- Formation: July 2, 1942; 84 years ago
- Type: Governmental organisation
- Purpose: Fundamental scientific research
- Headquarters: Štefánikova 49 814 38, Bratislava 1
- Official language: Slovak
- President: Martin Venhart
- Main organ: Snem Slovenskej akadémie vied
- Website: www.sav.sk

The Slovak Academy of Sciences (Slovak: Slovenská akadémia vied, or SAV) is the main scientific and research institution in Slovakia fostering basic and strategic basic research. It was founded in 1942, closed after World War II, and then reestablished in 1953.

Its primary mission is to acquire new knowledge of nature, society and technology, specifically targeted at ensuring scientific basis for the advancement in Slovakia. It comprises 58 scientific institutes and 13 ancillary institutions. The SAV edits 44 scientific and scholarly journals and 100–120 monographs per annum. Moreover, 41 scientific and scholarly societies, which associate scientists and scholars from various disciplines, are affiliated with SAV.

== History ==
The commencement of modern science in the 16th and 17th centuries resulted in the establishment of new institutions that supplemented classical universities and created a broader forum for fostering science communication. These institutions, which were built on the ancient Platonic traditions, became the starting point of our present day academies of sciences.

Matej Bel's project, submitted in 1735, marked the first attempt to establish such an institution on the territory of modern Slovakia. He suggested the founding of a Societas litteraria in Bratislava. His project, however, never materialized. In 1792, upon a proposal issued by a group of patriotic philologists, Slovenské učené tovarišstvo (The Slovak Learned Society) was founded. In 1844, under the impetus of Ľudovít Štúr, the nationwide cultural association, Tatrín, was instituted.

A few years later, in 1892, Andrej Kmeť published in Národné noviny (National News) his appeal to establish Slovenský vedecký spolok (Slovak Scientific Association), or Slovenská akadémia vied (Slovak Academy of Sciences). This idea led to the formation of Muzeálna spoločnosť slovenská (Slovak Association of Museums). On 2 July 1942, the Parliament of the Slovak Republic instituted Slovenská akadémia vied a umení (Slovak Academy of Sciences and Arts), which developed into a representative and, concomitantly, working institution fostering scientific scholarly research. During the post-World War II period the SAVU was transformed into Slovenská akadémia vied (Slovak Academy of Sciences; hereinafter the academy or the SAS as an abbreviation). Its establishment was legally grounded in an act passed by the Slovak National Council on 18 June 1953. The arrangement of its operation was regulated further by appurtenant legislation.

On 17 November 1989, significant changes at the academy were introduced. Since then, far-reaching transformations enabled the academy to become similar to counterpart organisations of science and research in advanced countries abroad.

== Present ==
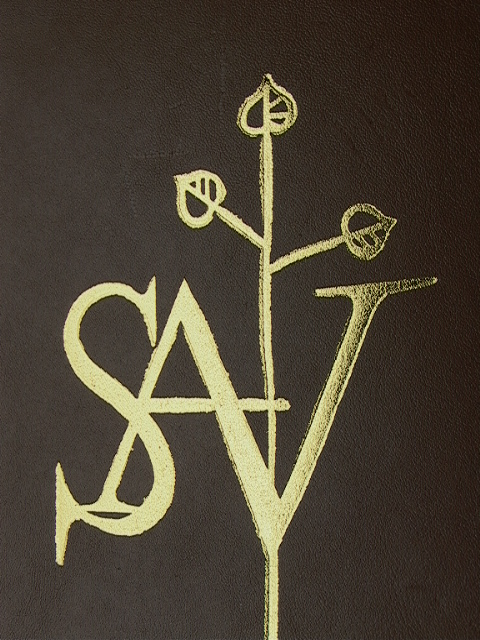
Service mark of the Slovak Academy of Sciences (SAV)

Nowadays, the Slovak Academy of Sciences successfully presents itself nationally and worldwide through the results in basic and applied research. It consists of 69 organisations, of which 48 are budgetary and 21 are subsidised. The academy publishes 57 scientific and professional journals and 8 yearbooks. There are 51 scientific and scholarly associations, societies and unions affiliated with the SAS, which operate in accordance with the Law on Civic Associations. The Assembly, the Scientific Council, and the Presidium are the academy's self-governing bodies.

The Assembly is the supreme self-governing Academy's body. Its members are elected by the academic staff of the respective scientific organisations from the academic staff of the SAS. The Scientific Council is a self-governing body of the academy that deliberates upon scientific and conceptional tasks. It is composed of the President of the academy and other members of the academy's Presidium, representatives delegated from the higher education sector, and a representative from the sector of business enterprise engaged in scientific research and development. Membership of the Scientific Council also includes representatives from organisations and institutions engaged in scientific research and development outside the academy, appointed by the chair of the academy's Assembly on the basis of elections of the members in the Scientific Council held by the Assembly.

The Presidium is an executive self-governing body of the academy. The Presidium is composed of the President, vice-presidents, Scientific Secretary, and other members of the Presidium, appointed by the chair of the academy's Assembly on the basis of the electoral returns for the academy's Presidium. The academy is headed by the President, who is appointed and recalled by the president of the Slovak Republic. The Presidium of the academy coordinates and supervises the activities of the academy and the performance of its organisations via the sections for the respective groups of science branches.

== Presidents ==
- 1953–1955: Ondrej Pavlík
- 1955–1961: Andrej Sirácky
- 1961–1965: Dionýz Blaškovič
- 1965–1970: Štefan Schwarz
- 1970–1974: Karol Šiška
- 1974–1989: Vladimír Hajko
- 1990–1992: Ladislav Macho
- 1992–1995: Branislav Lichardus
- 1995–2009: Štefan Luby
- 2009–2015: Jaromír Pastorek
- 2015–2025: Pavol Šajgalík
- Since 2025: Martin Venhart

== See also ==
- Astronomical Institute of Slovak Academy of Sciences
- Institute of Chemistry, Slovak Academy of Sciences
- Institute of Political Science of SAS
- Institute of Inorganic Chemistry Slovak Academy of Sciences
