= List of American Academy of Arts and Sciences members (2006–2019) =

The following is a list of members of the American Academy of Arts and Sciences from 2006 to 2019.

== 2006 ==
- Larry Abbott
- Floyd Abrams
- Linda Abriola
- Daron Acemoglu
- Peter Ackroyd
- Leonard Adleman
- Charles R. Alcock
- Alan Alda
- Dudley Andrew
- Donald Andrews
- Joshua Angrist
- Richard N. Aslin
- David Awschalom
- Ian Ayres
- Robert Badinter
- Subir Kumar Banerjee
- Dean P. Baquet
- Nathaniel Beck
- Harry Berger Jr.
- Charles Bernstein
- Randolph Blake
- Jeffrey Bluestone
- Lawrence D. Bobo
- Dale L. Boger
- Michael Botchan
- Peter A. Brooke
- Christopher R. Browning
- Maurizio Brunori
- Robert Alan Buhrman
- Kevin Peter Campbell
- Stephen R. Carpenter
- Marshall N. Carter
- Jeff Cheeger
- Kenneth Irvine Chenault
- Judith Chevalier
- Shu Chien
- Keith Christiansen
- Don W. Cleveland
- William Jefferson Clinton
- Phyllis D. Coley
- John M. Connors Jr.
- Susan N. Coppersmith
- William J. Cronon
- Michael C. Dawson
- Eugenia Maria del Pino Veintimilla
- Savas Dimopoulos
- Rita F. Dove
- Denis Duboule
- David Eisenbud
- Solomon Walter Englander
- Lee Epstein
- Richard H. Fallon Jr.
- Kit Fine
- Barbara J. Finlayson-Pitts
- Joachim Frank
- Margaret Tatnall Fuller
- Takashi Gojobori
- Michael Ellis Goldberg
- Matthew Goldstein
- Martin Golubitsky
- Michael F. Goodchild
- William A. Graham
- Jack P. Greene
- Bryan Thomas Grenfell
- Mark Groudine
- Anil K. Gupta
- Peter Haggett
- William R. Hambrecht
- Lee Herbert Hamilton
- Pierre Hassner
- Reid Hastie
- David Haussler
- R. Scott Hawley
- James William Head III
- Benjamin Walter Heineman Jr.
- Robert W. Hellwarth
- E. Tory Higgins
- Darlene Clark Hine
- Helen Haskell Hobbs
- James Oliver Horton
- Judith Temkin Irvine
- Yoh Iwasa
- Kenneth T. Jackson
- Richard Charles Murray Janko
- Xuefei Jin
- Kenneth Kaushansky
- Thomas Kean
- Mark Taylor Keating
- Rachel Keen
- Richard Kieckhefer
- David R. Knechtges
- Larry D. Kramer
- Richard Kraut
- Dominick C. LaCapra
- David A. Lake
- Robert K. Lazarsfeld
- Joseph E. LeDoux
- Lawrence Lessig
- Henry Allen Lester
- Arthur Elliott Levine
- Phillip Lopate
- Henri Loyrette
- Robert W. Mahley
- James L. Manley
- Lynne E. Maquat
- J. Andrew McCammon
- Susan K. McConnell
- Steven E. Miller
- Meredith Monk
- Nancy A. Moran
- Franco Moretti
- Margaret Mary Murnane
- Michael Murrin
- Victor Saul Navasky
- Nora S. Newcombe
- Charles M. Newman
- Stephen Nickell
- Abraham Nitzan
- Guust Nolet
- Peter J. Novick
- Paul Maxime Nurse
- Nai Phuan Ong
- George F. Oster
- Robert Eugene Page Jr.
- David Andrew Patterson
- Victor Pérez-Díaz
- Kenneth L. Pomeranz
- Keith T. Poole
- Andrew Postlewaite
- Anne Litle Poulet
- David Remnick
- Geraldine L. Richmond
- Bridget Riley
- John Glover Roberts Jr.
- John E. Roemer
- David Romer
- Robert David Sack
- Edward D. Salmon
- Anneila Isabel Sargent
- Barbara Anna Schaal
- Martin Scorsese
- Lore Segal
- Peter Sellars
- Stephen H. Shenker
- Gordon Murray Shepherd
- Choon Fong Shih
- James Lauriston Skinner
- Amos Brittain Smith III
- Nahum Sonenberg
- Helen Bowdoin Spaulding
- Charles S. Spencer
- Charles S. Stanish
- James H. Stock
- Timothy Manning Swager
- Michael Tilson Thomas
- Wilma Stein Tisch
- Craig A. Tracy
- George F. Vande Woude
- Pravin P. Varaiya
- Paula Vogel
- Ellen Bryant Voigt
- Rosmarie Waldrop
- Mary C. Waters
- Seth Paul Waxman
- Leslie H. Wexner
- Harold Widom
- Nicholas Wolterstorff

== 2007 ==
- Rosalie Silberman Abella
- Hector Daniel Abruna
- Akhil Reed Amar
- Nancy C. Andrews
- Roger Angell
- Stephen D. Ansolabehere
- Emanuel Ax
- Renee Baillargeon
- John Banville
- Brenda L. Bass
- Bonnie Lynn Bassler
- Aaron T. Beck
- Alexis T. Bell
- Frank A. Bennack Jr.
- Philip P. Betancourt
- Rosina M. Bierbaum
- David Gordon Blackbourn
- Michael R. Bloomberg
- Lee Bontecou
- Donald Bren
- Rodney Brooks
- Donald E. Brownlee
- Madeline Harrison Caviness
- Arup K. Chakraborty
- Aram V. Chobanian
- F. Michael Christ
- Michael J. Colacurcio
- Jerry Allen Coyne
- Nancy L. Craig
- David Cutler
- Jacques d'Amboise
- Alan M. Dachs
- William James Dally
- Titia de Lange
- David J. DeWitt
- Tom D. Dillehay
- Michael Vincent Drake
- Persis Sydney Drell
- Darrell Duffie
- Christopher F. Edley Jr.
- Glenn Ellison
- Stephen T. Emlen
- John A. Endler
- Robert S. Erikson
- Gøsta Esping-Andersen
- Deborah Estrin
- Margot E. Fassler
- Ernst Fehr
- Lawrence K. Fish
- Karl Frederick Freed
- Kenneth R. French
- Gregory Chung-Wei Fu
- Susan Gal
- John A. Goldsmith
- Bernard M. Gordon
- Albert A. Gore Jr.
- Anthony G. Greenwald
- Robert L. Griess Jr.
- Patricia Hampl
- Douglas Hanahan
- Pat Hanrahan
- Henry Hansmann
- Robert Pogue Harrison
- David Harvey
- Barton Ford Haynes
- Geoffrey Paul Hellman
- Lars Hernquist
- Avram Hershko
- Barry Hirsh Honig
- Herbert Hovenkamp
- Ehud Hrushovski
- Raymond B. Huey
- Thomas J.R. Hughes
- Isabel Virginia Hull
- Lily Y. Jan
- Yuh Nung Jan
- Alexander Dixon Johnson
- William L. Jorgensen
- James W. Jorgenson
- Alexandra Leigh Joyner
- Victor Kac
- Peter Michael Kareiva
- Pamela Susan Karlan
- Haig H. Kazazian Jr.
- Evelyn Fox Keller
- Chaitan Khosla
- Jon M. Kleinberg
- Christof Koch
- Remment Koolhaas
- J. Michael Kosterlitz
- Robert Andrew Lamb
- Charles Hunt Langley
- John Lasseter
- Spike Lee
- Thomas W. Lentz
- David F. Levi
- Peter Wai-Kwong Li
- Arthur Lupia
- Terry Magnuson
- Juan Martin Maldacena
- Gail Mandel
- N. Gregory Mankiw
- Lawrence G. Manley
- W. James McNerney Jr.
- Jerry M. Melillo
- Morton H. Meyerson
- James Charles Moeser
- Errol Mark Morris
- Tomasz Stanislaw Mrowka
- Venkatesh Narayanamurti
- Alan Needleman
- Aryeh Neier
- Norman P. Neureiter
- Whitney K. Newey
- Richard G. Niemi
- Arto Veikko Nurmikko
- Michel Claudio Nussenzweig
- Sandra Day O'Connor
- Baldomero M. Olivera
- Moshe Oren
- Michael Ortiz
- E. Roger Owen
- Nell Irvin Painter
- Luis Fernando Parada
- Terence Dwight Parsons
- Nicholas Beaver Penny
- Peter C. Perdue
- Saul Perlmutter
- Michael Petrides
- Robert B. Pippin
- Helen M. Piwnica-Worms
- Stephen B. Pope
- Mary Eleanor Power
- Yvonne Rainer
- George Ranney
- Peter J. Ratcliffe
- M. Thomas Record
- Elsa M. Redmond
- Steve Reich
- William K. Reilly
- Richard L. Revesz
- Marcia J. Rieke
- James E. Risen
- Arthur Rock
- Frances McCall Rosenbluth
- Joshua Richard Sanes
- Aldo Schiavone
- Stephen Schiffer
- Peter H. Schiller
- Eric Schmidt
- Steven A. Schroeder
- John Henry Schwarz
- John Patrick Shanley
- Judith R. Shapiro
- John Shattuck
- David E. Shaw
- Martin Jay Sherwin
- Nanako Shigesada
- Debora Kuller Shuger
- James H. Sidanius
- Richard Sieburth
- Wilfried Sieg
- Joseph I. Silk
- Linda B. Smith
- James M. Snyder Jr.
- Dan Sperber
- John Lee Spudich
- Stephen Stamas
- Robert A. M. Stern
- Robert M. Stroud
- John L. Sullivan
- Lino Tagliapietra
- Michael Eugene Taylor
- Jeremy W. Thorner
- John L. Thornton
- Billie Tsien
- William Lawrence Twining
- Mitsuko Uchida
- Joan Selverstone Valentine
- Brian William Vickers
- Kenneth L. Wallach
- Alice Waters
- Margaret Weir
- Susan R. Wessler
- Bruce Western
- David R. Williams
- Michael J. Williams
- Tod Williams
- Timothy Williamson
- Mark L. Wilson
- James Wood
- Edward L. Wright
- Wu Hung
- Junying Yuan
- Viviana A. Zelizer
- Robert J. Zimmer

== 2008 ==
- Berni Julian Alder
- Pedro Almodóvar
- Marin Alsop
- Elizabeth S. Anderson
- Susan C. Athey
- Robert Hamilton Austin
- Barbara A. Baird
- Ruzena Bajcsy
- James A. Baker III
- Mahzarin Banaji
- Utpal Banerjee
- Zdenek P. Bazant
- Peter S. Bearman
- Mary Catherine Beckerle
- Alexander A. Beilinson
- Charles R. Beitz
- Graeme I. Bell
- Nuel Belnap
- Simon Blackburn
- Mel Bochner
- Janet Elizabeth Browne
- Gerald L. Bruns
- Benjamin H.D. Buchloh
- Linda Brown Buck
- Lawrence Buell
- Brook H. Byers
- Emily Ann Carter
- Jorge G. Castaneda
- Sun-Yung Alice Chang
- Aaron Judah Ciechanover
- Fred E. Cohen
- Tobias Colding
- Linda S. Cordell
- France A. Cordóva
- Nancy F. Cott
- Peter Robert Crane
- Christopher C. Cummins
- Lauren B. Dachs
- Frans B.M. de Waal
- Pablo Gaston Debenedetti
- Eddie Dekel
- Michael Saul Dell
- Michael Hughes Dickinson
- Elizabeth Diller
- John Herbert Dirks
- Michael John Donoghue
- Vladimir Drinfeld
- Jorge Durand
- Alessandro Duranti
- Cynthia Dwork
- John V. Fleming
- Helene Peet Foley
- Richard Norman Foster
- Daniel Frenkel
- Richard A. Friesner
- Susan A. Gelman
- Charles M. Geschke
- Michael E. Geyer
- Daniel Todd Gilbert
- Lawrence Steven Goldstein
- Roger H. Gordon
- Mark Granovetter
- Jerome Groopman
- Alan D. Grossman
- Timothy L. Grove
- Jonathan Gruber
- Samuel Gubins
- John Guckenheimer
- David Hammons
- Philip C. Hanawalt
- Larry V. Hedges
- Richard H. Herman
- John Eyres Hobbie
- Mark A. Horowitz
- James Thomas Hynes
- Jeffrey R. Immelt
- John E. Jackson
- Jainendra Kumar Jain
- Rakesh K. Jain
- Klavs Flemming Jensen
- Edward P. Jones
- Stathis N. Kalyvas
- Harvey Jules Karten
- James Fraser Kasting
- Marc Aaron Kastner
- David Kazhdan
- Mark Gregory Kelman
- David A. Kenny
- Peter S. Kim
- Mark Kirkpatrick
- Richard D. Kolodner
- Carol L. Krumhansl
- John Kuriyan
- William M. Landes
- Bruno Latour
- John H. Lawton
- Thorne Lay
- Mitchell Avery Lazar
- G. Peter Lepage
- Alan Miller Leslie
- Marsha I. Lester
- Arthur D. Levinson
- Thomas Evan Levy
- Earl Lewis
- Judy Lieberman
- David J. Lipman
- Stephen Lisberger
- Milton Lodge
- George Loewenstein
- Nikos K. Logothetis
- Tom C. Lubensky
- Thom Mayne
- Craig Cameron Mello
- William I. Miller
- Timothy J. Mitchison
- Jeffrey Scott Moore
- Glenn W. Most
- Riccardo Muti
- Diana Carole Mutz
- Eiichi Nakamura
- Gülru Necipoğlu
- Indra Nooyi
- Calvin Normore
- Peter O'Donnell Jr.
- Piermaria J. Oddone
- John Tinsley Oden
- Robert Orsi
- Thomas R. Palfrey III
- Orhan Pamuk
- Louis A. Perez Jr.
- Norbert Perrimon
- Richard H. Pildes
- James D. Plummer
- Theodore M. Porter
- James L. Powell
- Louis J. Ptacek
- David C. Queller
- David Louis Quint
- Jean-Michel Rabaté
- Margaret Jane Radin
- Richard F. Rashid
- Jeffrey Victor Ravetch
- Charles Richardson Ray
- Paul G. Richards
- Adam G. Riess
- Jasper Rine
- Anne Walters Robertson
- Daniel Rodgers
- Patrick G. Ryan
- Paul Sagan
- Scott D. Sagan
- Pedro A. Sanchez
- David T. Sandwell
- Jose Sarukhan Kermez
- Lynne Sharon Schwartz
- Joan Wallach Scott
- Marlan Orvil Scully
- Reva Beth Siegel
- Debora Leah Silverman
- James H. Simons
- Charles Simonyi
- Yuri Slezkine
- Henry I. Smith
- Raymond W. Smith
- Haim Sompolinsky
- Jeremy C. Stein
- John Paul Stevens
- Thomas F. Steyer
- Bruce William Stillman
- Susan Carol Stokes
- Jeffrey Lee Stout
- Joan E. Strassmann
- Kevin Struhl
- David Frederick Swensen
- Alan Trachtenberg
- Richard Tuttle
- Dawn Upshaw
- C. Megan Urry
- Ewine Fleur van Dishoeck
- Daniel Vasella
- James W. Vaupel
- Michael J. Wade
- John E. Warnock
- Elizabeth Warren
- Fiona Mary Watt
- Ernest Weinrib
- Michael D. Whinston
- Margaret C. Whitman
- Huntington Faxon Willard
- Elliot R. Wolfson
- Robert Wuthnow
- Yehudi Wyner
- Xiaoliang Sunney Xie
- Melinda A. Zeder
- Leonard Ira Zon

== 2009 ==
- Abul K. Abbas
- Andrew Abbott
- Kenneth S. Abraham
- Sankar L. Adhya
- Nancy E. Adler
- David A. Agard
- Philippe Aghion
- Danielle Allen
- Karl P. Ameriks
- Nima Arkani-Hamed
- Stevan James Arnold
- Peter S. Aronson
- David Baker
- Spencer Charles Hilton Barrett
- Kenny Barron
- Eric E. Becklin
- G. Vann Bennett
- Robert Berne
- Mary Elizabeth Berry
- Spencer Janney Bloch
- Patrick Bolton
- H. Kim Bottomly
- Marianne Bronner
- John Seely Brown
- Rogers Brubaker
- Cynthia J. Burrows
- Mario R. Capecchi
- Richard Walter Carlson
- Robert A. Caro
- Sean B. Carroll
- John T. Casteen III
- Richard E. Cavanagh
- Mary Ann Caws
- Michael Chabon
- Eric L. Charnov
- Jennifer Alice Clack
- Louis Geoffrey Cowan
- Stanley Crouch
- James S. Crown
- Hongjie Dai
- D. Ronald Daniel
- Ronald J. Daniels
- Dennis Russell Davies
- Karen Davis
- Judy S. DeLoache
- Mahlon Robert DeLong
- Judi Dench
- Mathias Dewatripont
- Paul J. DiMaggio
- John Doerr
- John J. Donohue III
- Esther Duflo
- James Anthony Dumesic
- Scott Vernon Edwards
- William Eggleston
- Richard Eisenberg
- John (Jaś) Elsner
- Carl William Ernst
- Paul Edward Farmer
- Robert A. Fefferman
- Andrew Paul Feinberg
- Paul J. Ferri
- Eduardo Hector Fradkin
- John R. Freeman
- Benjamin M. Friedman
- Robert Michael Gates
- William Michael Gelbart
- Ronald M. George
- Alan S. Gerber
- Robert S. Gibbons
- H. Charles J. Godfray
- Dorian Goldfeld
- Simon D. Goldhill
- Ursula W. Goodenough
- Edith M. Grossman
- Jane I. Guyer
- James E. Haber
- Bradford H. Hager
- Naomi J. Halas
- Jeffrey Hamburger
- Ann Katherine Hamilton
- Emmylou Harris
- Lene Vestergaard Hau
- Daniel Murray Hausman
- Kristen Hawkes
- Michael Heizer
- Adam Heller
- Tina M. Henkin
- Deborah R. Hensler
- Paul David Hewson
- Eve J. Higginbotham
- Alan G. Hinnebusch
- Dustin Hoffman
- Douglas R. Hofstadter
- Craig James Hogan
- Marilyn Horne
- Guido W. Imbens
- Ronald F. Inglehart
- Mary Jane Irwin
- Matthew O. Jackson
- Stein Bjornar Jacobsen
- Gish Jen
- Mark A. Johnson
- James Earl Jones
- William Chester Jordan
- Nancy Kanwisher
- Aharon Kapitulnik
- Alice Y. Kaplan
- Mehran Kardar
- Guinevere Alice Mei-ing Kauffmann
- Rashid Khalidi
- Jamaica Kincaid
- Michael J. Klarman
- Maria Klawe
- J. David Konstan
- Kent Kresa
- Jon A. Krosnick
- Ray Kurzweil
- Barbara Landau
- Michael John Laver
- T.J. Jackson Lears
- Michael George Longley
- Steven Gwon Sheng Louie
- Thomas E. Mallouk
- Carol Caruso Mancusi-Ungaro
- Maxine L. Margolis
- Dale Basil Martin
- James M. McPherson
- Andrew N. Meltzoff
- Theodor Meron
- Cathy E. Minehan
- Malcolm Morley
- J. Anthony Movshon
- Elizabeth G. Nabel
- W. James Nelson
- Guy Jérôme Pierre Nordenson
- Patrick H. O'Farrell
- Kate O'Regan
- Pierre Omidyar
- Jose Nelson Onuchic
- Lelio Orci
- H. Allen Orr
- Susan Packard Orr
- Bernard Osher
- Stanley J. Osher
- Julie E. Packard
- Stuart Stephen Papworth Parkin
- Edward E. Penhoet
- Philip Noel Pettit
- Aron Pinczuk
- A. Stephen Polasky
- Joseph William Polisi
- Ross Posnock
- Colin Luther Powell
- Itamar Rabinovich
- Raghuram G. Rajan
- Anjana Rao
- Nicholas Rescher
- Deborah L. Rhode
- Mark J. Roe
- Theodore C. Rogers
- Ares J. Rosakis
- Robert Rosenthal
- John W. Rowe
- Gary B. Ruvkun
- Matthew S. Santirocco
- Jonathan D. Sarna
- Caleb Powell Haun Saussy
- Ricardo Scofidio
- Steven Shapin
- Neil H. Shubin
- Beth Ann Simmons
- Robert H. Singer
- Michael Sipser
- Dan I. Slobin
- Alfred Z. Spector
- Susan Levitt Stamberg
- Stephen Peter Stich
- Karen B. Strier
- Sanjay Subrahmanyam
- Attila Szabo
- Strobe Talbott
- Terence Tao
- Volker ter Meulen
- Philip Eyrikson Tetlock
- Romila Thapar
- Edwin Lorimer Thomas
- Matthew Tirrell
- John Merrill Toole
- Emilie M. Townes
- James William Truman
- Gunther Uhlmann
- Edward Villella
- Robert von Hallberg
- Claes von Hofsten
- James Warren Wagner
- Warren Morton Washington
- David E. Wellbery
- James V. Wertsch
- Gary L. Westbrook
- Jennifer Widom
- J. Harvie Wilkinson III
- John Williams
- Ruth J. Williams
- Timothy D. Wilson
- Tobias Wolff
- Wong Kar Wai
- Donald E. Worster
- Martin F. Yanofsky
- Ruth Bernard Yeazell
- Wayne M. Yokoyama
- Peter Zumthor

== 2010 ==
- Ervand Abrahamian
- Edward H. Adelson
- Larissa Adler-Lomnitz
- Richard B. Alley
- Joseph G. Altonji
- Christiane M. Amanpour
- Philip S. Anderson
- Joseph E. Aoun
- Yitzhak Apeloig
- Robert Scott Appleby
- Kathryn A. Bard
- Samuel H. Barondes
- Frank S. Bates
- Andrea Louise Bertozzi
- Michael Blackwood
- Gene D. Block
- Thomas Blumenthal
- Carles Boix
- Manuel J. Borja-Villel
- Leo Braudy
- Robert Paul Brenner
- David B. Brooks
- Randal E. Bryant
- Louise Henry Bryson
- Valerie Jane Bunce
- Adam Seth Burrows
- Ricardo J. Caballero
- Harvey Cantor
- Sunney I. Chan
- G. Marius Clore
- Gerald L. Clore
- G. Wayne Clough
- Henri Cole
- Jonathan Jay Cole
- Ruth Berins Collier
- Peter S. Constantin
- Robert Graham Cooks
- Francis Ford Coppola
- John M. Cornish
- Scott S. Cowen
- Harvey Gallagher Cox Jr.
- Peter Cresswell
- Carlo M. Croce
- Charles E. Curran
- Stuart A. Curran
- Ruth S. DeFries
- John J. DeGioia
- Ronald Anthony DePinho
- Susan Desmond-Hellmann
- Michael Dine
- David G. Drubin
- Jon Michael Dunn
- Susan K. Dutcher
- Lynn W. Enquist
- Martha Julia Farah
- Shoshana Felman
- Frances Ferguson
- Roger W. Ferguson Jr.
- David Sean Ferriero
- David L. Ferster
- Christopher Bower Field
- Howard Lincoln Fields
- Neil D. Fligstein
- Donald W. Forsyth
- Hal Foster
- Joseph S. Francisco
- Paul Harris Freedman
- Joaquin M. Fuster
- Robert L. Gallucci
- Don Garrett
- Samuel H. Gellman
- Mark Gertler
- Edward Ludwig Glaeser
- Gary A. Glatzmaier
- William A. Goddard III
- Nigel David Goldenfeld
- Arthur L. Goldstein
- Jan E. Goldstein
- Michael Marc Gottesman
- Daniel E. Gottschling
- Greg Grandin
- Mark Lee Green
- Robert M. Groves
- Martin Gruebele
- Thomas Gunning
- John L. Hagan
- David Haig
- Benjamin D. Hall
- Andrew D. Hamilton
- Thomas Hampson
- Haim Harari
- Richard M. Harland
- Carla A. Hesse
- Ray W. Hilborn
- Charles O. Holliday Jr.
- Daniel Walker Howe
- Ronald R. Hoy
- Evelyn L. Hu
- David Huse
- Toyo Ito
- James Sidney Jackson
- John Calvin Jeffries Jr.
- John I. Jenkins
- Joseph B. Kadane
- Mark N. Kaplan
- Henry Kaufman
- Michael A. Keller
- Kathleen Kennedy
- Jim Yong Kim
- Karla Kirkegaard
- Robert E. Kottwitz
- Martin E. Kreitman
- Kurt Lambeck
- Jaime Laredo
- Chung K. Law
- James Leach
- Mike Leigh
- Nicholas B. Lemann
- Neil Levine
- Michael Levitt
- Timothy J. Ley
- John A. Lithgow
- Roderick J. Little
- Andrea J. Liu
- Nancy Ann Lynch
- Paul G. Mahoney
- Scott P. Mainwaring
- Andrew J. Majda
- Jose Maria Maravall
- Geoffrey W. Marcy
- Robert D. Mare
- James Henry Marrow
- Steve Martin
- Michel G. Mayor
- Nolan McCarty
- William J. McGinnis
- Donald W. Meinig
- Peter Istvan Meszaros
- Jerald T. Milanich
- Parviz Moin
- James Michael Moran
- Richard A. Muller
- Gary Jan Nabel
- Carol C. Nadelson
- Gerald L. Neuman
- Olufunmilayo I. Olopade
- Monica Olvera de la Cruz
- Raymond E. Ozzie
- Samuel J. Palmisano
- Roy R. Parker
- Linda Partridge
- Christopher A. B. Peacocke
- Wolfgang Pesendorfer
- Richard Edward Petty
- Barry R. Posen
- Eric Posner
- Kimberly Ann Prather
- William L. Rawn III
- David E. Robertson
- Marilynne S. Robinson
- Sonny Rollins
- Thomas F. Rosenbaum
- Loren R. Rothschild
- Emmanuel S. Saez
- Esa-Pekka Salonen
- Marjorie M. Scardino
- Morton Schapiro
- Alanna Schepartz
- David Schmeidler
- Johanna M. Schmitt
- Myron S. Scholes
- Liev Schreiber
- Robert David Schreiber
- Gary M. Segura
- David N. Seidman
- Laurence Philip Senelick
- Freydoon Shahidi
- Jalal Shatah
- Marc Shell
- Seana Shiffrin
- Robert J. Shimer
- Roberto Sierra
- Richard S. Slotkin
- Catherine E. Snow
- Scott Soames
- Joel Sobel
- Deepak Srivastava
- Arnold Steinhardt
- Garrett Stewart
- Brian Charles Alexander Stock
- Michael Stonebraker
- Peter L. Strauss
- Susan Strome
- Madhu Sudan
- Thomas C. Sudhof
- Ratan N. Tata
- John N. Thompson
- Loa P. Traxler
- Luis A. Ubinas
- Moshe Y. Vardi
- Ernest Borisovich Vinberg
- Heinrich von Staden
- Gunter P. Wagner
- Bruce D. Walker
- Denzel Washington
- David A. Weitz
- Mary Fanett Wheeler
- John Warren Wilkins
- Forman A. Williams
- Rowan Douglas Williams
- James R. Williamson
- Jeannette M. Wing
- Fred M. Winston
- Elisabeth Jean Wood
- Craig M. Wright
- Philip G. Zimbardo
- Jan M. Ziolkowski
- Maciej R. Zworski

== 2011 ==
- Richard Warren Aldrich
- Victor Ambros
- Luc E. Anselin
- Frances Hamilton Arnold
- Wanda M. Austin
- Jesse Huntley Ausubel
- Thomas Banks
- John Andrew Bargh
- Mary Beard
- Anna Katherine Behrensmeyer
- Roland J. M. Benabou
- Marsha J. Berger
- Timothy J. Besley
- Philip V. Bohlman
- Anthony S. Bryk
- John E. Bryson
- Kenneth L. Burns
- R. Paul Butler
- Elizabeth J. Cabraser
- Thomas P. Campbell
- James Ireland Cash Jr.
- Francisco G. Cigarroa
- Edmund Melson Clarke
- James Clifford
- Geoffrey W. Coates
- Ernest H. Cockrell
- Timothy J. Colton
- Robert K. Colwell
- David Paul Corey
- Stanley A. Corngold
- George William Crabtree
- Robert Howard Crabtree
- Peter W. Culicover
- George Q. Daley
- Chi Van Dang
- Marcetta Y. Darensbourg
- Daniel Day-Lewis
- Juan José de Pablo
- David de Rothschild
- Raymond J. Deshaies
- Vishva Dixit
- Edward P. Djerejian
- John P. Donoghue
- Steven Neil Durlauf
- Bob Dylan
- Penelope Eckert
- Jonathan A. Epstein
- Alex Eskin
- Edward W. Felten
- Russell Dawson Fernald
- Martha Finnemore
- Claude S. Fischer
- Philip Fisher
- Nancy Foner
- Catherine S. Fowler
- Scott E. Fraser
- Joseph Francis Fraumeni Jr.
- Glenn H. Fredrickson
- Julio Frenk
- Sarah Fuller
- Thomas W. Gaehtgens
- Franklin I. Gamwell
- Daniel E. Garber
- Sylvester James Gates Jr.
- Sharon C. Glotzer
- Annette Gordon-Reed
- Maxwell E. Gottesman
- Hugh Grant
- Paul Anthony Griffiths
- Sol Michael Gruner
- John Guare
- Robert D. Haas
- Daniel Arie Haber
- Jacquelyn Dowd Hall
- Ray A. Hammond
- Martin P. Head-Gordon
- Jeffrey J. Henderson
- Robert F. Higgins
- Katherine Ann High
- Okihide Hikosaka
- Edward Hoagland
- E. Brooks Holifield
- Jenny Holzer
- Eric Joel Horvitz
- Thomas Yizhao Hou
- Leah H. Jamieson
- Jay H. Jasanoff
- W. Thomas Johnson Jr.
- Alex S. Jones
- Michael I. Jordan
- Marcel Kahan
- Frances Myrna Kamm
- Linda P.B. Katehi
- Kazuya Kato
- Jonathan N. Katz
- Thomas Forrest Kelly
- J. Mark Kenoyer
- Talmadge Everett King Jr.
- Robert E. Kingston
- Joseph Klafter
- Steven Knapp
- Robert Kraft
- David I. Laibson
- Chester Charles Langway Jr.
- Lewis Lee Lanier
- L. Gary Leal
- Andrei Dmitriyevich Linde
- John A. List
- Beatrice Longuenesse
- William Roger Louis
- Todd Joseph Martínez
- Raghunath A. Mashelkar
- Mark A. Mazower
- Bill McKibben
- H. Jay Melosh
- Louis Menand
- Geoffrey P. Miller
- Jeffrey H. Miller
- Chad A. Mirkin
- Helen Mirren
- Margaret M. Mitchell
- Gregory Winthrop Moore
- W. Jason Morgan
- Richard I. Morimoto
- Ellen Mosley-Thompson
- Shree K. Nayar
- William Barlow Neaves
- Ei-ichi Negishi
- Angelika Neuwirth
- Katherine S. Newman
- Svante Pääbo
- David Conrad Page
- Scott E. Page
- David G. Pearce
- Monika Piazzesi
- Hugh David Politzer
- Trevor Douglas Price
- Peter B. Reich
- Robert D. Reischauer
- David N. Reznick
- Adam Roberts
- Malcolm Austin Rogers
- Thomas Romer
- C. Brian Rose
- Rodney J. Rothstein
- Martine F. Roussel
- Roberta L. Rudnick
- David W. Russell
- Laurent Saloff-Coste
- Larry Samuelson
- Michael Scammell
- Michael H. Schill
- Amita Sehgal
- Louis Michael Seidman
- Sybil Putnam Seitzinger
- Patricia Griffiths Selinger
- Eric U. Selker
- James S. Shapiro
- Kevan M. Shokat
- Peter Williston Shor
- Paul Simon
- David J. Skorton
- Bruce David Smith
- Eduardo Elisio Machado Souto de Moura
- Debora L. Spar
- Gabrielle M. Spiegel
- Charles Haines Stewart III
- Howard A. Stone
- Gisela T. Storz
- Thomas J. Sugrue
- Wesley I. Sundquist
- Michael K. Tanenhaus
- Ann Taves
- Herbert F. Tucker
- Christopher R. Udry
- Luisa Valenzuela
- Michael R. Van Valkenburgh
- J. Mario Pedro Vargas Llosa
- Lothar von Falkenhausen
- Brian A. Wandell
- Jean Yin Jen Wang
- Samuel A. Waterston
- Sandra Robin Waxman
- Barbara Weinstein
- Henry S. White Jr.
- Miles D. White
- Marvin Pete Wickens
- Avi Wigderson
- Robert Wilson
- Hisashi Yamamoto
- Stephen C. Yeazell
- Shigeyuki Yokoyama
- Yuk Ling Yung
- James C. Zachos
- Shou-Wu Zhang

== 2012 ==
- Arvind
- Gabriel Aeppli
- Ken L. Alder
- Eva Y. Andrei
- Ann Margaret Arvin
- David Autor
- Martin D. Baron
- George F. Bass
- Kamaljit Singh Bawa
- Angela M. Belcher
- Christopher Benfey
- Barry George Bergdoll
- Bonnie Berger
- James M. Berger
- Marianne Bertrand
- Jeffrey Preston Bezos
- Sven P. Birkerts
- Joan S. Lyttle Birman
- Meredith May Blackwell
- David William Blight
- Jef D. Boeke
- Paul Artin Boghossian
- Elizabeth Hill Boone
- Michael E. Bratman
- Philip N. Bredesen
- Emery Neal Brown
- James Allison Brown
- Caroline Astrid Bruzelius
- Philip Howard Bucksbaum
- John P. Burgess
- R. Nicholas Burns
- Russel E. Caflisch
- Edward Matthew Callaway
- John M. Carey
- John R. Carlson
- Edward G. Carmines
- Robert Leonard Carneiro
- Katharine Venable Cashman
- Hans Clevers
- Hillary Rodham Clinton
- Lizabeth Cohen
- Jared Leigh Cohon
- James Joseph Collins
- Robert P. Colwell
- Lawrence Corey
- Tom Curran
- Colin Dayan
- Philippe Descola
- Shari Seidman Diamond
- Edward Francis Diener
- James N. Druckman
- Brian Jay Druker
- Victor J. Dzau
- Alice Hendrickson Eagly
- Clint Eastwood
- Karl W. Eikenberry
- Sarah Carlisle Roberts Elgin
- Laura Engelstein
- Martha Feldman
- Susan Ferro-Novick
- Robert Fettiplace
- Amy Finkelstein
- Joseph J. Fins
- Debra Ann Fischer
- Steven A. Frank
- Kenneth C. Frazier
- Melinda French Gates
- Elisabeth R. Gerber
- Robert H. Giles
- Thomas D. Gilovich
- Midori Gotō
- Carol J. Greenhouse
- Irene Greif
- Robert Guy Griffin
- Sharon Hammes-Schiffer
- David Hare
- Rita Eleanor Hauser
- Philip Andrew Hieter
- Ana Magdalena Hurtado
- Vincent Lamont Hutchings
- Robert A. Iger
- Tyler E. Jacks
- Mark Johnston
- Gerald F. Joyce
- M. Frans Kaashoek
- Steven Michael Kahn
- Daniel Kahne
- Ehud Kalai
- Michael Kearns
- Edmund Francis Kelly
- Dennis V. Kent
- William Kentridge
- Stuart K. Kim
- Shinobu Kitayama
- Igor R. Klebanov
- Steven S. Koblik
- Gary A. Koretzky
- Bruce Kovner
- Mitzi Irene Kuroda
- James A. Lake
- Herbert Levine
- Daryl Levinson
- Reynold Levy
- Jennifer A. Lewis
- Richard P. Lifton
- Thomas Milton Liggett
- Abraham Loeb
- Jonathan B. Losos
- Liqun Luo
- David W.C. MacMillan
- Maureen E. Mahoney
- George J. Mailath
- Terrence Malick
- Thomas Mallon
- Carolyn A. Martin
- Anthony W. Marx
- Diane Mathis
- Kathleen McCartney
- Paul McCartney
- Michael McCormick
- Margaret J. McFall-Ngai
- Michael A. McRobbie
- Daniel Mendelsohn
- Paul Mendes-Flohr
- Jack R. Meyer
- Robert A. Moffitt
- Bao Chau Ngo
- Michael A. North
- John O'Shea
- Gregory B. Olson
- David W. Oxtoby
- Athanassios Z. Panagiotopoulos
- Michele Parrinello
- Judea Pearl
- John Brian Pendry
- Elizabeth Anya Phelps
- Jerry Pinkney
- Bjorn Mikhail Poonen
- Jean Porter
- Andre George Previn
- Penny S. Pritzker
- Jessica Rawson
- Francois Recanati
- L. Rafael Reif
- Danny F. Reinberg
- Matthew White Ridley
- Joseph Roach
- James A. Robinson
- Griffin Platt Rodgers
- Ignacio J. Rodriguez-Iturbe
- Daniel Rose
- Joanna Semel Rose
- David G. Roskies
- Alex Ross
- Eli Ruckenstein
- Vicki L. Ruiz
- Kaija Saariaho
- Bernard Sadoulet
- Scott Russell Sanders
- David T. Scadden
- Dolph Schluter
- W. Ronald Schuchard
- Michael Schudson
- Brenda A. Schulman
- Helmut F. Schwarz
- Jeffrey A. Segal
- Ismail Serageldin
- Robert Martin Seyfarth
- Steven A. Siegelbaum
- Larry Simpson
- Kiki Smith
- David Nathaniel Spergel
- Alicia Elsbeth Stallings
- Maureen L. Stanton
- George Stephanopoulos
- Gerald Stern
- Steve Jefferey Stern
- J. Fraser Stoddart
- Steven H. Strogatz
- Eleonore Stump
- Richard E. Sylla
- Richard Lawrence Taylor
- Alan Robert Templeton
- Rodolfo Hector Terragno
- Augusta Read Thomas
- James S. Tisch
- Marvin Trachtenberg
- Yaacov Trope
- Gina G. Turrigiano
- Jeffrey D. Ullman
- Veronica Vaida
- David Theodore Van Zanten
- Frederica von Stade
- Andrew G. Walder
- Kara Walker
- Sanford I. Weill
- David A. Weisbach
- Henry M. Wellman
- Anthony Welters
- John Werren
- Christopher Wheeldon
- Keith E. Whittington
- David Brian Wilkins
- Ernest James Wilson III
- Matthew A. Wilson
- Brenda Wineapple
- Judy Woodruff
- Crispin James Garth Wright
- Stephen Yablo
- Eli Yablonovitch
- Peidong Yang
- A. Peter Young
- Alexander B. Zamolodchikov
- Luigi G. Zingales

== 2013 ==
- Jonathan C. Abbott
- Anant Agarwal
- Rakesh Agrawal
- Edward Cleveland Aldridge Jr.
- T. Alexander Aleinikoff
- David Matthew Altshuler
- Arturo Alvarez-Buylla
- Martin Amis
- Meinrat O. Andreae
- Mark Aronoff
- Carmen C. Bambach
- Julian P. Barnes
- Bonnie Bartel
- Cynthia M. Beall
- Henri Berestycki
- Shelley L. Berger
- Wendell E. Berry
- Bruce A. Beutler
- Arthur I. Bienenstock
- Robert Allen Bjork
- Martin J. Blaser
- Kerry Steven Bloom
- Nicholas Bloom
- Xandra Owens Breakefield
- Paul Arthur Buttenwieser
- David E. Cane
- David John Chalmers
- Roz Chast
- Alan D. Code
- David K. Cohen
- Martha Constantine-Paton
- Richard G. Cooke
- Robert De Niro
- Daniel Diermeier
- Robbert H. Dijkgraaf
- David L. Dill
- Annie Dillard
- Emma M. Donoghue
- Douglas Druick
- Janice Eberly
- Mickey H. Edwards
- Susan J. Eggers
- Martin Stewart Eichenbaum
- Elliot Lawrence Elson
- Larry G. Epstein
- Jon McVey Erlandson
- Jeffrey Kent Eugenides
- Donna M. Ferriero
- Sally M. Field
- Michael Fishbane
- Renée Fleming
- Paula Fredriksen
- Jeffrey M. Friedman
- Athol Fugard
- Jed A. Fuhrman
- Thomas B. Ginsburg
- Alison Gopnik
- Paula T. Hammond
- Herbie Hancock
- Philip J. Hanlon
- Serge Haroche
- John Stratton Hawley
- Timothy M. Heckman
- Stephen B. Heintz
- Frances Hellman
- Steven Allen Hillyard
- Robert Dan Holt
- Donald C. Hood
- Gary T. Horowitz
- Frederick E. Hoxie
- John D. Huber
- Glenn H. Hutchins
- Anthony Ragnar Ives
- Simon David Jackman
- Margaret Candee Jacob
- Herve M. Jacquet
- Robert Loren Jaffe
- Christine Jolls
- Dan M. Kahan
- Marc Kamionkowski
- Robert A. Kaster
- Regis B. Kelly
- Kenneth J. Kemphues
- Nancy Knowlton
- Eugene V. Koonin
- Rae Langton
- David Winslow Latham
- Edward O. Laumann
- Sara Lawrence-Lightfoot
- H. Blaine Lawson Jr.
- Virginia Man-Yee Lee
- Frank Richard Lentricchia
- Naomi Ehrich Leonard
- John G. Levi
- John T. Lis
- Andrew W. Lo
- Joseph Loscalzo
- Scott William Lowe
- James R. Lupski
- Kenneth C. Macdonald
- Stephen Joseph Macedo
- Arun Majumdar
- Jitendra Malik
- Susan L. Mann
- John Francis Manning
- Susan Marqusee
- Alan George Marshall
- Sarah Crawford Maza
- Rose M. McDermott
- David J. Meltzer
- Peter F. Michelson
- D.A. Miller
- Ernest J. Moniz
- Randall T. Moon
- Michael Edward Moseley
- Shaul Mukamel
- Klaus Mullen
- Hitoshi Murayama
- Richard J. Murnane
- Anne-Sophie Mutter
- Charles Alexander Nelson III
- David John Nesbitt
- Marshall D. Newton
- Stephen G. Nichols
- Chrysostomos L. Nikias
- Peter Norvig
- Barbro Sachs Osher
- John A. Parrish
- David M. Perlmutter
- Christopher John Pethick
- Judy Pfaff
- Suzanne Pfeffer
- Duong H. Phong
- William James Poorvu
- Sorin T. Popa
- Jonathan K. Pritchard
- Emily Rauh Pulitzer
- Karin M. Rabe
- Jed S. Rakoff
- Nicholas Read
- Lauren B. Resnick
- Jennifer Rexford
- Ranulfo Romo
- Richard M. Rosenberg
- Mark Rosenzweig
- Edward Rothstein
- David M. Rubenstein
- Teofilo F. Ruiz
- Peter Salovey
- Pamela Samuelson
- Maxine L. Savitz
- Stuart B. Schwartz
- Terrence Joseph Sejnowski
- Geraldine Seydoux
- Charles J. Sherr
- Yigong Shi
- Yoshiaki Shimizu
- Thomas M. Siebel
- Alastair Smith
- Marshall S. Smith
- Michael Andrew Smith
- Bruce Springsteen
- Laurence David Steinberg
- Richard Stoltzman
- Walter A. Strauss
- Ann Swidler
- Richard Alfred Tapia
- Marc Trevor Tessier-Lavigne
- Paul Theroux
- T. Don Tilley
- Natasha D. Trethewey
- Barbara G. Tversky
- Sandra L. Vehrencamp
- David R. Walt
- Leonard Wantchekon
- Michael D. Warner
- Sheldon Weinbaum
- Renata M.M. Wentzcovitch
- Michael C. Whitlock
- Ronald A. Williams
- David Jeffery Wineland
- Phyllis Wise
- Asher Wolinsky
- Kathryn Ann Woolard
- Jerry L. Workman
- Bin Yu
- Xiaowei Zhuang

== 2014 ==
- Joanna Aizenberg
- Catherine L. Albanese
- Susan C. Alberts
- Graham T. Allison Jr.
- El Anatsui
- Dora E. Angelaki
- Manuel Arellano
- Isobel Mair Armstrong
- Neta Assaf Bahcall
- Deborah Loewenberg Ball
- Robert D. Ballard
- Bruce Palmer Bean
- Anthony J. Bebbington
- Graham A.C. Bell
- Karol Berger
- Steven T. Berry
- Hans Dieter Betz
- Nancy Bonini
- John F. Brady
- Michael P. Brenner
- George W. Breslauer
- John Broome
- Michel Broue
- A. S. Byatt
- Walter Cahn
- Charles M. Cameron
- Emmanuel J. Candes
- Gerardo J. Ceballos Gonzalez
- James Kenneth Chandler
- Jennifer Tour Chayes
- Anthony K. Cheetham
- Raj Chetty
- Arul M. Chinnaiyan
- John B. Cobb Jr.
- Donald Lee Court
- Janet M. Currie
- William V.B. Damon
- Linda Darling-Hammond
- Ken A. Dill
- Nicholas B. Dirks
- Chris Q. Doe
- Johanna Ruth Drucker
- Timothy Earle
- Elazer Reuven Edelman
- Peter P. Edwards
- Christopher L. Eisgruber
- Katherine Theresa Faber
- Ronald Fagin
- Kenneth A. Farley
- Charles Francis Feeney
- Jules Ralph Feiffer
- Margaret W. Ferguson
- Arthur Fine
- James Fishkin
- Garret Adare FitzGerald
- Nathan A. Fox
- Jerry Forest Franklin
- Edward Frenkel
- Tamas F. Freund
- Daniel Harry Friedan
- W. Kent Fuchs
- Inez Fung
- David Gabai
- Adam Gamoran
- Alan Gilbert
- Christopher K. Glass
- Pinelopi K. Goldberg
- Louis M. Gomez
- Andrew David Gordon
- Richard L. Gourse
- Jeremy Grantham
- Harry Walter Greene
- Warner Craig Greene
- Patricia Marks Greenfield
- Michael Greenstone
- Linda Gregerson
- Shiv I.S. Grewal
- Lawrence Grossman
- Susan D. Gubar
- Helen Hardacre
- David Harel
- Fiona Anne Harrison
- Nathan Orr Hatch
- Maxwell K. Hearn
- Amy Hempel
- Adam Hochschild
- Wayne Hu
- Robert Huckfeldt
- Donald Frederick Hunt
- Martin Sean Indyk
- John Winslow Irving
- Shanto Iyengar
- Vicki C. Jackson
- Carl H. June
- Eric William Kaler
- Michael Barry Kastan
- Mary C. Kelley
- Richard W. Kenyon
- Ellen D. Ketterson
- William Hugh Kling
- Daphne Koller
- Clifford P. Kubiak
- Thomas A. Kunkel
- Leslie B. Lamport
- Sherry Lee Lansing
- Risa J. Lavizzo-Mourey
- Leslie Anne Leinwand
- Jill Lepore
- Jonathan Levin
- Leonid A. Levin
- Ann Marie Lipinski
- Richard Jay Lipton
- Daniel F. Louvard
- C. Owen Lovejoy
- David J. Luban
- M. Cristina Marchetti
- Kerry James Marshall
- John H.R. Maunsell
- Paula D. McClain
- David A. McCormick
- Michael S. McPherson
- Sabeeha Merchant
- Ruth Garrett Millikan
- James D. Morrow
- Edward Wallace Muir Jr.
- Susan Naquin
- Keith Adam Nelson
- Tere R. O'Connor
- Peter S. Onuf
- Al Pacino
- Susan Paine
- Peter Palese
- Hermann Parzinger
- Dinshaw J. Patel
- Nikola Panayot Pavletich
- Eric R. Pianka
- Stephen Plog
- Earl Ward Plummer
- Sheldon I. Pollock
- Alvin Francis Poussaint
- George L. Priest
- Thomas J. Pritzker
- E. Annie Proulx
- Stephen R. Quake
- William M. Reddy
- Robert B. Reich
- Elizabeth Jean Reitz
- John Washington Rogers Jr.
- John Ashley Rogers
- Mendel Rosenblum
- Lee H. Rosenthal
- Amy C. Rosenzweig
- Mary Klevjord Rothbart
- Bernardo Luis Sabatini
- Mary Jo Salter
- Roger W. Sant
- Patti B. Saris
- George William Saunders
- Charles Lazelle Sawyers
- David Gilliam Schatz
- Londa L. Schiebinger
- Paul A. Seidel
- Jaime Sepúlveda
- Ramamurti Shankar
- Dan Shechtman
- Richard Bruce Silverman
- Michelle Yvonne Simmons
- M. Celeste Simon
- Elaine Sisman
- Robert Harry Socolow
- Dam Thanh Son
- Pol D. Spanos
- David L. Spector
- Jerry I. Speyer
- Gigliola Staffilani
- Claudio Daniel Stern
- Bryan A. Stevenson
- Marcelo M. Suárez-Orozco
- Robert Suckale
- Daniel Ioan Tataru
- Ngugi wa Thiong'o
- Sarah Elizabeth Thomas
- Sherry Turkle
- Wilfred A. van der Donk
- Robert Dirk van der Hilst
- J. David Velleman
- Geoffrey Myles Wahl
- Diana Harrison Wall
- A. Eugene Washington
- Gary L. Watson
- Carrie Mae Weems
- Paul Storch Weiss
- Janet Feldman Werker
- Rachel I. Wilson
- John C. Wingfield
- John Fabian Witt
- Amanda L. Woodward
- Larry James Young
- Anthony Zee
- Alex K. Zettl

== 2015 ==
- Christopher Abani
- David Z. Albert
- Lisa Anderson
- Carl Andre
- Marcia Angell
- Morris S. Arnold
- Sanjeev Arora
- Harold W. Attridge
- Laszlo Babai
- Phil S. Baran
- Nahum Barnea
- Roy F. Baumeister
- Gerard Ben Arous
- Jean Bennett
- David Bercovici
- Ivan T. Berend
- Sangeeta Bhatia
- Lorenzo Gennaro Bianconi
- Sarah A. Binder
- Robert E. Bly
- June Kathryn Bock
- A'Lelia Bundles
- William J. Burns
- Carlos J. Bustamante
- Marc G. Caron
- Kang-i Sun Chang
- Patricia Smith Churchland
- Dante Cicchetti
- Margaret S. Clark
- John Clarke
- Robert E. Cohen
- Judith Marjorie Collins
- Clive M. Cookson
- Holland Cotter
- Thomas B. F. Cummins
- James W. Curran
- Hermann Danuser
- Gary Dell
- Philip J. Deloria
- Joseph L. DeRisi
- Susan T. Dumais
- Geoff Dyer
- Joseph R. Ecker
- Liran Einav
- Peter T. Ellison
- Jonathan A. Ellman
- Michael B. Elowitz
- David Eltis
- Bjorn Engquist
- Anne Fadiman
- Timothy J. Feddersen
- Noah R. Feldman
- Stanley Fields
- Alexei V. Filippenko
- John Freccero
- Igor B. Frenkel
- Roland G. Fryer Jr.
- David W. Garland
- Matthew Gentzkow
- George Georgiou
- Morteza Gharib
- Martin Gilens
- Jane C. Ginsburg
- David D. Ginty
- Thomas J. Greytak
- Terry Gross
- David B. Grusky
- Taekjip Ha
- Laura M. Haas
- Kenji Hakuta
- Joseph Y. Halpern
- Philip Hamburger
- Paul L. Harris
- John F. Hartwig
- Sally Haslanger
- N. Katherine Hayles
- Maurice P. Herlihy
- Gail Hershatter
- Tin-Lun Ho
- Kay E. Holekamp
- Linda C. Hsieh-Wilson
- Maria D. Hummer-Tuttle
- Kay Bailey Hutchison
- Alberto Ibargüen
- Enrique Iglesia
- Allen F. Isaacman
- Feisal Amin Rasoul Istrabadi
- Nina G. Jablonski
- Kay Redfield Jamison
- John D. Joannopoulos
- Joan Jonas
- Eugenia Kalnay
- Hans Kamp
- Ravindran Kannan
- David B. Kaplan
- David Michael Karl
- Victoria M. Kaspi
- David Kleinfeld
- Peter J. Klenow
- James T. Kloppenberg
- Philip H. Knight
- Brian K. Kobilka
- Lewis A. Kornhauser
- Barbara Kruger
- Richard Kurin
- György Kurtág
- Michael J. Lenardo
- George E. Lewis
- Magnus Lindberg
- Margaret S. Livingstone
- Margaret Lock
- Wallace D. Loh
- Ann Lurie
- John Gordon MacFarlane
- David H. MacLennan
- Renu Malhotra
- Peter Mandler
- Michael Mann
- Kenneth J. Marians
- Tim Maudlin
- Jane Dammen McAuliffe
- James McBride
- Frank P. McCormick
- Audra A. McDonald
- Paul L. McEuen
- Nicholas W. McKeown
- Milbrey W. McLaughlin
- Francoise Meltzer
- Edward Mendelson
- William P. Minicozzi II
- David R. Morrison
- Janet A. Napolitano
- Philip Needleman
- Joseph Neubauer
- Karl J. Niklas
- Robert M. Nosofsky
- Robert L. Nussbaum
- Dennis D. M. O'Leary
- Paul A. Offit
- Murray Perahia
- Raymond T. Pierrehumbert
- Jill Pipher
- Christopher O. Plummer
- Christopher A. Prendergast
- Miroslav Radman
- Roger Ratcliff
- Philip J. Reny
- Keren D. Rice
- Rebecca R. Richards-Kortum
- Rebecca W. Rimel
- Douglas Rivers
- Valery A. Rubakov
- Alexander Rudensky
- Rubén G. Rumbaut
- Jenny Saffran
- Cristián T. Samper
- Alejandro Sánchez Alvarado
- Mark S. Schlissel
- Sandra L. Schmid
- Gregory R. Schopen
- David D. Shulman
- Stewart Shuman
- Joseph Sifakis
- Joan B. Silk
- Paul Slovic
- Michael P. Snyder
- David Stasavage
- James Stone
- Sharon Y. Strauss
- Teresa A. Sullivan
- David S. Tatel
- Roger M. Temam
- Kathleen Thelen
- Joseph Travis
- Donald G. Truhlar
- Neil deGrasse Tyson
- Johan van Benthem
- Gerhard Wagner
- Peter C. Wainwright
- Darren Walker
- Stephen T. Warren
- James A. Wells
- Ivan Werning
- Robin L. West
- Karen L. Wooley
- Carol M. Worthman
- Jay Jie Xu
- Wei Yang
- Ali Yazdani

== 2016 ==
- Ronny Abraham
- Diane Ackerman
- Andreas J. Albrecht
- Farooq Azam
- Chunli Bai
- Andrew E. Barshay
- Austin M. Beutner
- Manfred Bietak
- Bernard S. Black
- Donna Gail Blackmond
- Michael S. Brainard
- Horst Bredekamp
- Edythe L. Broad
- Keith W.T. Burridge
- Robert E. Buswell Jr.
- Edwin Cameron
- Andrea Louise Campbell
- Brandice Canes-Wrone
- John Michael Carethers
- Jean M. Case
- Roger Chartier
- Erwin Chemerinsky
- Andrew J. Cherlin
- Victor Chernozhukov
- Michelene T.H. Chi
- Rey Chow
- Andrew G. Clark
- Tom C. Conley
- Fergus I.M. Craik
- Benjamin F. Cravatt III
- Thibault Damour
- Kathleen A. Deagan
- Jeffrey A. Dean
- Jeremy Denk
- Jill Dolan
- James R. Downing
- Jennifer L. Eberhardt
- Patricia Buckley Ebrey
- Richard H. Ebright
- Douglas J. Emlen
- Pavel Etingof
- Percival Everett
- Mathea Falco
- JoAnn Falletta
- Denis Feeney
- Tamar Flash
- Janet Franklin
- Hans-Joachim Freund
- Joshua A. Frieman
- Robert J. Full
- Gerald G. Fuller
- John Gabrieli
- Theaster Gates Jr.
- R. Benny Gerber
- Sanjay Ghemawat
- Lila M. Gierasch
- Gerd Gigerenzer
- Margaret P. Gilbert
- Gary Gilliland
- Sander L. Gilman
- Robert M. Glaeser
- Robert Gober
- Robert L. Goldstone
- Robert A. Gottlieb
- Joanne S. Gowa
- M. Temple Grandin
- Steve Granick
- Donald K. Grayson
- Sanford D. Greenberg
- Sandra E. Greene
- Leslie Greengard
- Adam M. Habib
- Beatrice H. Hahn
- David P. Hajjar
- Sergiu Hart
- Terrance A. Hayes
- Carl-Henrik Heldin
- Antonia Hernandez
- Jacqueline Hewitt
- Ralph J. Hexter
- Donald Hilvert
- Marianne Hirsch
- Mellody L. Hobson
- Mark W. Hochstrasser
- Ary A. Hoffmann
- Heinz Robert Holliger
- Ali Hortacsu
- G. John Ikenberry
- Donald E. Ingber
- Nancy Y. Ip
- Walter Isaacson
- Barbara V. Jacak
- Steven E. Jacobsen
- Larry L. Jacoby
- Christopher Jarzynski
- Shelly Kagan
- Anna R. Karlin
- Kim Kashkashian
- Jay D. Keasling
- Robin D.G. Kelley
- Jeffery W. Kelly
- Joel Grant Kingsolver
- Jack Knight
- Janos Kollar
- Alex L. Kolodkin
- Yusef Komunyakaa
- Melvin J. Konner
- Samuel S. Kortum
- Chryssa Kouveliotou
- Bryna R. Kra
- Adrian R. Krainer
- Joachim Kupper
- M. Magdalene Lampert
- Carol D. Lee
- David L. Lee
- David W. Leebron
- Warren J. Leonard
- Ling Li
- Michael J. Lichten
- Glenn Ligon
- Ronald K. Linde
- Kuo-sung Liu
- Timothy P. Lodge
- Lawrence A. Loeb
- Gordon D. Logan
- Helen E. Longino
- Monica Cecilia Lozano
- Glen M. MacDonald
- Menachem Magidor
- M. Elizabeth Magill
- Ulrike Malmendier
- George M. Marsden
- Kelsey C. Martin
- Vann McGee
- Mark Alan McPeek
- Robert Brian Millard
- Scott J. Miller
- Tom M. Mitchell
- Russell A. Mittermeier
- Festus G. Mogae
- John T. Monahan
- Toshiko Mori
- Trevor Morrison
- Sendhil Mullainathan
- Carl F. Nathan
- Eric G. Neilson
- Carol Ann Newsom
- Christof Niehrs
- David Nirenberg
- Eva Nogales
- Jacqueline Novogratz
- Andrei Okounkov
- Hirosi Ooguri
- Sarah P. Otto
- Roberto D. Peccei
- Susan G. Pedersen
- James W. Pellegrino
- Rob Phillips
- Paul Pierson
- Mikhail Borisovich Piotrovskiy
- Terry A. Plank
- Jennifer J. Raab
- Tal D. Rabin
- Jahan Ramazani
- Mary Ann Rankin
- Debraj Ray
- Helene Rey
- Christopher A. Reynolds
- Louise M. Richardson
- Vladimir Rokhlin
- Bruce R. Rosen
- John L. R. Rubenstein
- Melanie S. Sanford
- Kim Lane Scheppele
- Robert J. Schoelkopf
- Peter H. Schuck
- Arthur I. Segel
- Joel Seligman
- Michael A. Sells
- Nicholas A. Serota
- Scott J. Shenker
- Yang Shi
- Wayne Shorter
- David E. Simpson
- Lorna Simpson
- Maynard E. Solomon
- David St. John
- James Stavridis
- Zeev Sternhell
- Thomas F. Stocker
- Lisa Tauxe
- Alan S. Taylor
- Colm Toibin
- George Tsebelis
- Shimon Ullman
- Anne M. Villeneuve
- Peter W. Voorhees
- Karen H. Vousden
- Isiah M. Warner
- Michael R. Wasielewski
- Elke U. Weber
- Ralph Weissleder
- Steven R. White
- Christopher S. Wood
- James F. Woodward
- Kevin L. Young
- Kongjian Yu
- Long Yu
- Oscar A. Zanetti

== 2017 ==
- Chimamanda Ngozi Adichie
- Aigboje Ihedero Aig-Imoukhuede
- Michael Aizenman
- Richard D. Alba
- James P. Allison
- Angelika Amon
- Thomas E. Anderson
- Ruth Arnon
- Nadine Aubry
- Hari Balakrishnan
- Richard G. Baraniuk
- Eugene Bardach
- Cynthia Barnhart
- Frank R. Baumgartner
- Jeremy M. Berg
- Per-Olof Berggren
- Manjul Bhargava
- Andre Bishop
- Gregory S. Boebinger
- Monika Boehm-Tettelbach
- Squire J. Booker
- David L. Boren
- William J. Borucki
- Janet M. Box-Steffensmeier
- Edward S. Boyden III
- David G. Bradley
- Caroline B. Brettell
- Elizabeth Broun
- Lester R. Brown
- Myles A. Brown
- Lonnie G. Bunch III
- Carol Burnett
- Ursula M. Burns
- Jerome R. Busemeyer
- Bradley R. Cairns
- Robin M. Canup
- Judith A. Carney
- Erick M. Carreira
- Dana Carroll
- Arturo Casadevall
- Anne C. Case
- Jamie H.D. Cate
- Gerald L. Chan
- Ronnie C. Chan
- Christopher J. Chang
- David Charbonneau
- Zhu Chen
- Nicholas A. Christakis
- Mary Louise Cleave
- Stephen T. Coate
- Dalton Conley
- Charles S. Craik
- David Damrosch
- Beverly Davidson
- Giovanni De Micheli
- Scott E. Denmark
- Everette E. Dennis Jr.
- Cheryl L. Dorsey
- Gregg Easterbrook
- Jonathan Eaton
- Kerry A. Emanuel
- Roger W. Falcone
- Russell H. Fazio
- Samuel R. Freeman
- Else Marie Friis
- Kathryn Scott Fuller
- Raghavendra Gadagkar
- Jeanne K. Gang
- Sumit Ganguly
- Alan M. Garber
- Maria Cristina Garcia
- Sergey Gavrilets
- Heather K. Gerken
- Gretchen Holbrook Gerzina
- Paula J. Giddings
- Karen I. Goldberg
- Francisco Goldman
- Andrea J. Goldsmith
- Joshua R. Goldstein
- Gabriela Gonzalez
- Amy Goodman
- Edmund Gordon
- Roland Greene
- Lenore A. Grenoble
- Clare P. Grey
- David Grossman
- Pamela Grossman
- Anna Grzymala-Busse
- Megan R. Gunnar
- John Guy
- Beverly Guy-Sheftall
- Janet Gyatso
- Jacob S. Hacker
- Christopher D. Hacon
- John Haffenden
- Takeshi Hamashita
- Brenda L. Hillman
- Sarah E. Hobbie
- Hopi E. Hoekstra
- Carl R. Holladay
- Kathleen C. Howell
- Salima Ikram
- Joichi Ito
- Torben Iversen
- Paul E. Jacobs
- Alison M. Jaggar
- Stephanie W. Jamison
- Maria Jasin
- Andrew R. Jassy
- Attahiru M. Jega
- Paula A. Johnson
- Peter A. Jones
- Leemor Joshua-Tor
- James T. Kadonaga
- Panagiotis Karkanas
- Elly T. Katabira
- Scott N. Keeney
- Darcy B. Kelley
- Diebedo Francis Kere
- Yannis G. Kevrekidis
- Pradeep K. Khosla
- Young-Kee Kim
- Sidney Kimmel
- Desmond King
- Barbara Kirshenblatt-Gimblett
- Roberta L. Klatzky
- Robert T. Knight
- Robert V. Kohn
- Marie-Josee Kravis
- Nicholas D. Kristof
- Jonathan Lear
- Ann L. Lee
- William F. Lee
- John Legend
- Christopher D. Lima
- Karolin Luger
- Akin Ladipo Mabogunje
- Greil Marcus
- Donald J. Mastronarde
- Nergis Mavalvala
- Helen S. Mayberg
- Jane M. Mayer
- Joseph-Achille Mbembe
- Ian M. McKellen
- John R. McNeill
- Marc J. Melitz
- Juanita L. Merchant
- Suzanne B. Mettler
- Earl K. Miller
- Richard K. Miller
- Charles W. Mills
- John C. Mitchell
- W. J. Thomas Mitchell
- M. Granger Morgan
- Craig Moritz
- Mona Nemer
- William T. Newsome III
- Rohini Nilekani
- Lynn Nottage
- Evgeny Nudler
- Ronald L. Olson
- Naomi Oreskes
- Carlo Maria Ossola
- N. Geoffrey Parker
- Alina A. Payne
- Nicholas A. Peppas
- Nancy Beth Peretsman
- Carter G. Phillips
- Jean-Paul Poirier
- Mary C. Potter
- Romano Prodi
- Martin Quack
- John Quelch
- Jeroen G. W. Raaijmakers
- Valerie A. Ramey
- Rino Rappuoli
- Richard W. Rapson
- Sean F. Reardon
- John R. Rickford
- Faith Ringgold
- Luigi Rizzi
- Dana L. Robert
- Paul B. Rothman
- N. C. Jacob Rothschild
- Daniela Rus
- Ghassan Salame
- Peter Schafer
- Paul L. Schechter
- Eric Schickler
- Fred B. Schneider
- Nadrian C. Seeman
- Ilya R. Segal
- Vera Serganova
- Eldar Shafir
- Zhixun Shen
- Dean Sheppard
- Pamela A. Silver
- Johannes N. Sjostrand
- Matthew J. Slaughter
- Mark S. Slobin
- Douglas E. Soltis
- Pamela S. Soltis
- Suzanne T. Staggs
- Randall L. Stephenson
- Kathryn D. Sullivan
- Arthur C. Sze
- Keith S. Thomson
- Michael Tomasello
- Emanuel Tov
- Mark Neil Trahant
- George G. Triantis
- Robert Tycko
- Mark Volpe
- Peter M. Warren
- André Watts
- Mark Westoby
- James Q. Whitman
- Michael Witherell
- Björn Wittrock
- Tim Wu
- Tadataka Yamada
- J. Frank Yates
- Katherine A. Yelick
- Tara E. Zahra
- Jonathan Zittrain
- Marlene Zuk

== 2018 ==
- Aileen C. Adams
- Natalie G. Ahn
- Hilal Ali Al-Hinai
- Lilli Alanen
- Fernando E. Alvarez
- R. Michael Alvarez
- Leif Andersson
- Robert Audi
- Katherine Baicker
- Leon Balents
- Dan Balz
- Lisa Feldman Barrett
- Jocelyn Bell Burnell
- Myma A. Belo-Osagie
- Marc R. Benioff
- Darwin K. Berg
- Joanne Berger-Sweeney
- Lauren Berlant
- Helen M. Berman
- Sue Biggins
- Carla Bley
- Deborah A. Borda
- Alexei Borodin
- Philippe Bourgois
- John R. Bowen
- Bernard R. Boxill
- Anthony P. Bretscher
- Eric A. Brewer
- C. Jeffrey Brinker
- Bill Brown
- Bruce Buffett
- Ian Buruma
- Laurie J. Butler
- David N. Cannadine
- Xuetao Cao
- Sylvain E. Cappell
- Gang Chen
- Robert B. Cialdini
- Helen E. Clark
- Ta-Nehisi Coates
- Cathy J. Cohen
- Deborah A. Cohen
- John J. Collins
- Roger D. Cone
- Mariano-Florentino Cuéllar
- Ana Maria Cuervo
- Jason G. Cyster
- Patricia A. D'Amore
- Christian Davenport
- Jill G. de Villiers
- James W. Demmel
- Susan M. Dymecki
- Timothy Egan
- Judith S. Eisen
- Deborah Eisenberg
- Linda T. Elkins-Tanton
- Charles D. Ellis
- Ezekiel J. Emanuel
- Randall W. Engle
- Juan Enriquez
- Ora Entin-Wohlman
- Katherine Farley
- Steven Feierman
- Paula E. Findlen
- Gary Alan Fine
- Erika Fischer-Lichte
- David Fitzpatrick
- Stephen R. Forrest
- Jeffry A. Frieden
- Cynthia M. Friend
- Judith Frydman
- Tedros A. Ghebreyesus
- Tim Giago
- Simon E. Gikandi
- Itzhak Gilboa
- Rosemary G. Gillespie
- Paul Gilroy
- Thelma Golden
- Risa L. Goluboff
- Robert Gooding-Williams
- Gita Gopinath
- Michael Govan
- Michael R. Green
- Angela M. Gronenborn
- Leonidas J. Guibas
- Larry D. Guth
- Tom Hanks
- J. Wade Harper
- Michael E. Hasselmo
- W. Reed Hastings Jr.
- Craig J. Hawker
- Carla D. Hayden
- Daniel Heller-Roazen
- Rebecca M. Henderson
- Matthias W. Hentze
- Marillyn A. Hewson
- Evelyn Brooks Higginbotham
- Julia B. Hirschberg
- Reid G. Hoffman
- Jennifer Hornsby
- Peter Jay Hotez
- Hilary W. Hoynes
- Rexhep Ismajli
- Allan Jacobson
- Heinrich M. Jaeger
- Svetlana Jitomirskaya
- Renata Kallosh
- Matthew T. Kapstein
- Henry C. Kapteyn
- Robert L. Kendrick
- Sara Kiesler
- Jacqueline M. King
- Patricia W. Kitcher
- Gabor Klaniczay
- Maurice Kleman
- Sandra Knapp
- Martti Koskenniemi
- Tony Kouzarides
- Chapurukha M. Kusimba
- Marta Kutas
- Gloria Ladson-Billings
- Robert Landick
- Mark A. Lemley
- Roger N. Lemon
- Tania León
- Robert W. Levenson
- Susan C. Levine
- Haifan Lin
- Dahlia Lithwick
- Jianguo Liu
- K. Tsianina Lomawaima
- Catherine Lord
- Nathaniel Mackey
- Marc Mangel
- Henrietta Mann
- Johanna Mappes
- Pablo A. Marquet
- Rosa L. Matzkin
- Tali Mendelberg
- David W. Miliband
- Joseph C. Miller
- Kazuo Miyamoto
- Anthony P. Monaco
- Esther D. Mwaikambo
- Arkadi S. Nemirovski
- Viet Thanh Nguyen
- H. Frederik Nijhout
- Pippa Norris
- Barack H. Obama
- Elaine S. Oran
- Eduardo J. Padron
- Claire L. Parkinson
- Parag A. Pathak
- Anne Woods Patterson
- Laurie L. Patton
- David H. Perlmutter
- Naomi E. Pierce
- David J. Pine
- Richard J. Powell
- Laurene Powell Jobs
- Eliot Quataert
- Andrew F. Read
- David R. Reichman
- Susanne S. Renner
- Andrea Rinaldo
- Nancy L. Rose
- Ellen V. Rothenberg
- Leigh H. Royden
- Deborah F. Rutter
- Osamu Saito
- Steven L. Salzberg
- Guillermo R. Sapiro
- Debra Satz
- Malcolm Schofield
- Ivan K. Schuller
- Sara Seager
- Ruth G. Shaw
- Richard Shiff
- Gerald I. Shulman
- Jorge L. Soberon
- Gurindar S. Sohi
- Sonia Sotomayor
- Jacqueline Stewart
- Jessica Stockholder
- Jacqueline Stone
- Melody Ann Swartz
- Lorraine S. Symington
- Diana Taylor
- Edward E. Telles
- Andrei Tokmakoff
- F. Dean Toste
- Khaled Toukan
- Rebecca E. Traister
- Robert H. Tuttle
- Ann Twinam
- Linda J. Waite
- Christopher A. Walsh
- Robert Warrior
- K. Birgitta Whaley
- Joy Williams
- Paul H. Wise
- Damian Woetzel
- Richard D. Wood
- Joanna K. Wysocka
- H. Peyton Young
- Xingpei Yuan
- Francesca Zambello
- Feng Zhang
- Huda Y. Zoghbi

== 2019 ==
- Susan L. Ackerman
- Zeid Ra'ad Al Hussein
- Haifa Reda Jamal Al-Lail
- Elizabeth Alexander
- Anita LaFrance Allen
- Fred W. Allendorf
- Valerie A. Amos
- Kristi S. Anseth
- Dimitri A. Antoniadis
- Natsuki Aruga
- Alan Ashworth
- Patricia Barber
- Rachel E. Barkow
- Natalie M. Batalha
- Edward Baugh
- Emily Bazelon
- Marlene Behrmann
- Francine D. Berman
- Rene Bernards
- Nora Berrah
- Donald M. Berwick
- Francisco Bezanilla
- Sebastian Bonhoeffer
- Samuel S. Bowles
- Mark Bradford
- Derek E.G. Briggs
- Jane E. Buikstra
- Alison Butler
- Judith Butler
- José Ignacio Cabezón
- Candis Callison
- Clare Cavanagh
- Stephen J. Ceci
- Anantha P. Chandrakasan
- Joyce E. Chaplin
- Xiaohong Chen
- Yifan Cheng
- Eugene Chiang
- Melanie H. Cobb
- Katherine J. Cramer
- Jennifer Crocker
- Aliko Dangote
- Mitchell E. Daniels
- Donald J. Darensbourg
- Robert B. Darnell
- Nancy E. Davidson
- Sean M. Decatur
- Gabrielle Demange
- Souleymane Bachir Diagne
- Leah Dickerman
- Ivan Đikić
- Richard Durbin
- Enrique D. Dussel
- Kathryn Edin
- Harry J. Elam Jr.
- Debra M. Elmegreen
- Adam F. Falk
- James M. Fallows
- Guoping Feng
- Jonathan E. Franzen
- Nancy Fraser
- Jody Freeman
- Bojie Fu
- Ann M. Fudge
- Gerald Gabrielse
- Denise A. Galloway
- Huajian Gao
- Merrick B. Garland
- Patrick J. Geary
- Benjamin Geiger
- Michele J. Gelfand
- Jeff Gelles
- Clark Glymour
- Susan R. Goldman
- Judith L. Goldstein
- Rachel Green
- John P. Grotzinger
- Jean-Marie Guéhenno
- Jonathan Haidt
- Peter A. Hall
- Jo Handelsman
- Kathleen Mullan Harris
- Michael H. Harris
- Molly Haskell
- Jane Hirshfield
- Jonathan S. Holloway
- Keith J. Holyoak
- Susan S. Hubbard
- Sherrilyn Ifill
- Holly A. Ingraham
- Nobutaka Inoue
- Brad Inwood
- Margaret D. Jacobs
- Thomas P. Jenuwein
- Yishi Jin
- Mark H. Johnson
- Charles I. Jones
- Kellie Jones
- Robert J. Jones
- Mark D. Jordan
- Barbara B. Kahn
- David R. Karger
- Nadira D. Karunaweera
- Brian W. Kernighan
- Ronald C. Kessler
- Declan Kiberd
- Kenneth W. Kinzler
- David L. Kirp
- Daniel J. Klionsky
- Christopher W. Kuzawa
- Eliana La Ferrara
- Richard W. Lariviere
- Cato T. Laurencin
- Asunción Lavrin
- Eusebio Leal Spengler
- Frances E. Lee
- Judith M. Lieu
- Jennifer Lippincott-Schwartz
- Goodwin H. Liu
- Patty Loew
- Jeffrey R. Long
- Edna Longley
- Kam-Biu Luk
- Ellen Lupton
- Mikhail Lyubich
- Jodi Magness
- Kishore Mahbubani
- Brenda Major
- James Manyika
- Donald Margulies
- Carlos Marichal
- Michel D. Martin
- Kathleen McKeown
- Sara McLanahan
- Tracey L. Meares
- Konstantinos E.D. Meghir
- Bert W. Meijer
- Axel Meyer
- Danesh Moazed
- Edward B. Montgomery
- Melissa Moore
- Catherine J. Murphy
- N.R. Narayana Murthy
- Emi Nakamura
- Jacques Neefs
- Maggie Nelson
- Nandan Nilekani
- Suzanne M. Nora Johnson
- Michelle L. R. Obama
- Carol J. Oja
- Ngozi Okonjo-Iweala
- Jane T. Olson
- Richard S. Ostfeld
- Joseph W. Palca
- Timothy N. Palmer
- Mercedes Pascual
- Deval L. Patrick
- Roy D. Pea
- Nathaniel Persily
- Dianne M. Pinderhughes
- Mary Louise Pratt
- Daniel J. Rader
- Mark D. Rausher
- Charles H. Robbins
- Bryan L. Roth
- William T. Rowe
- James E. Ryan
- Subir Sachdev
- Daniel P. Schrag
- Kristin Scott
- Rachel A. Segalman
- Sylvia Serfaty
- Chris Shannon
- Tommie Shelby
- Michael J. Shelley
- Richard Shine
- Mona Siddiqui
- Eero P. Simoncelli
- Marietta Simpson
- Anna Deavere Smith
- David F. Smuts
- Valeria F. Souza Saldívar
- Margaret Beale Spencer
- Fiona J. Stanley
- Claire E. Sterk
- Patricia A. Thiel
- Lonnie G. Thompson
- Claire J. Tomlin
- Joe William Trotter Jr.
- Paul E. Turner
- David H. Vanderbilt
- András Vasy
- Gordana Vunjak-Novakovic
- Kenneth W. Warren
- Detlef Weigel
- Adam D. Weinberg
- Judith Weisenfeld
- Steven I. Wilkinson
- John T. Wixted
- Cynthia Wolberger
- Jeremy M. Wolfe
- Walt Wolfram
- Hansjörg Wyss
- Nobuyuki Yoshida
- Hirokazu Yoshikawa
- Clare C. Yu
- Jin-Quan Yu
- Daniel Zajfman
- Virginia A. Zakian
- Kelly R. Zamudio
- Ofer Zeitouni
- Ya-Qin Zhang
