= Danesh Moazed =

American geneticist

- Education: University of California, Santa Cruz
- Known for: RNAi-mediated heterochromain establishment, epigenetic inheritance
- Scientific career
- Fields: Epigenetics, chromatin, non-coding RNA
- Workplaces: Harvard Medical School, Howard Hughes Medical Institute
- Thesis: Interaction of 16S and 23S ribosomal RNA with functional ligands, implications for the mechanism of protein synthesis (1989)
- Doctoral advisor: Harry F. Noller
- Website: moazed.med.harvard.edu

Danesh Moazed is a Professor of the Department of Cell Biology at Harvard Medical School and an investigator at Howard Hughes Medical Institute. He is known for unveiling the mechanism of the RNAi-mediated heterochromatin establishment. His lab currently works on chromatin biology and epigenetic inheritance.

Moazed received an undergraduate degree and doctoral degree from the University of California, Santa Cruz. As a doctoral student, he worked with Dr. Harry F. Noller, investigating the structure and function of ribosomal RNA. He did postdoctoral research at University of California, San Francisco with Dr. Patrick H. O'Farrell and Dr. Sandy Johnson. In 1998, Moazed joined the faculty at the Harvard Medical School and became a Howard Hughes Medical Institute Investigator in 2008. In 2019, he was elected to American Academy of Arts and Sciences. In 2023, the National Academy of Sciences elected Moazed as a member of the Academy.
