= David Eltis =

Canadian historian

- Occupation: Historian
- Awards: American Academy of Arts and Sciences member (2025) Louis Gottschalk Prize (2012) Anisfield-Wolf Book Award (2011) James A. Rawley Prize (2011) Frederick Douglass Book Prize (2000)

Academic background
- Education: Durham University (BA); Dalhousie University (B.Ed.); University of Alberta (MA); University of Rochester (PhD)

Academic work
- Institutions: Emory University; Harvard University; University of British Columbia

David Eltis is a Canadian historian and scholar of the transatlantic slave trade. He is Robert W. Woodruff Professor of History Emeritus at Emory University, a Research Associate at the W. E. B. Du Bois Research Institute at Harvard University, and an Adjunct Professor of History at the University of British Columbia. Eltis is recognized as a leading figure in the study of Atlantic slavery and migration, known especially for his work on slavery databases and digital humanities projects.

== Education ==
Eltis received a Bachelor of Arts with honors in History from Durham University in 1962, followed by a B.Ed. from Dalhousie University in 1965. He earned his Master of Arts in History from the University of Alberta in 1969, and completed his Ph.D. in History at the University of Rochester in 1979.

== Career ==
Eltis has held academic positions in Canada, the United States, and the United Kingdom. He was Professor of History at Queen's University at Kingston from 1989 to 2002, and held the Robert W. Woodruff Professorship at Emory University from 2002 to 2012. He has also served as a Research Lecturer at the University of Hull (1995–2002), and as a Lecturer in Economics at Algonquin College (1967–1988).

He has held visiting appointments at several institutions, including a term as Visiting Professor in the Department of Afro-American Studies at Harvard University (1997), and as a Visiting Fellow at All Souls College, University of Oxford, in 2004. In 2000, he was a Senior Fellow at the Gilder Lehrman Center for the Study of Slavery, Resistance, and Abolition at Yale University.

== Research ==
Eltis specializes in the history of the early modern Atlantic world, with particular emphasis on slavery and migration, both forced and voluntary. He co-developed two influential digital resources: SlaveVoyages.org, a comprehensive database of transatlantic slave voyages, and African-Origins.org, which seeks to recover the identities of enslaved Africans.

== Honors and awards ==
- The RR Hawkins award for the best book published in 2025 by an American publisher Association of American Publishers (2026)
- W. E. B. Du Bois Medal, Harvard University (2025)
- Elected Fellow, American Academy of Arts and Sciences (2015)
- Louis Gottschalk Prize, American Society for Eighteenth-Century Studies (2012)
- Anisfield-Wolf Book Award (2011, co-winner)
- James A. Rawley Prize, American Historical Association (2011, co-winner)
- R. R. Hawkins Award, Association of American Publishers (2011)
- John T. Hubbell Prize, Civil War History (2008)
- Frederick Douglass Prize, Gilder-Lehrman Institute (2000)
- Trevor Reese Memorial Prize, Institute of Commonwealth Studies, University of London (1990)

== Selected bibliography ==
- D. Eltis. Economic Growth and the Ending of the Transatlantic Slave Trade. New York: Oxford University Press, 1987.
- D. Eltis. The Rise of African Slavery in the Americas. Cambridge: Cambridge University Press, 2000.
- D. Eltis (ed.). Coerced and Free Migration: Global Perspectives. Stanford: Stanford University Press, 2002.
- D. Eltis; F. D. Lewis; K. L. Sokoloff (eds.). Slavery in the Development of the Americas. Cambridge: Cambridge University Press, 2004.
- D. Eltis (ed.). Extending the Frontiers: Essays on the New Transatlantic Slave Trade Database. New Haven: Yale University Press, 2008.
- D. Eltis; F. D. Lewis; K. L. Sokoloff (eds.). Human Capital and Institutions: A Long-Run View. Cambridge: Cambridge University Press, 2009.
- D. Eltis; D. Richardson. The Atlas of the Transatlantic Slave Trade. New Haven: Yale University Press, 2010.
- C. Perry; D. Eltis; D. Richardson (eds.). The Cambridge World History of Slavery, Volume 2. Cambridge: Cambridge University Press, 2021.
- D. Eltis; S. L. Engerman; et al. The Cambridge World History of Slavery, Volume 3: AD 1420–AD 1804. Cambridge: Cambridge University Press, 2011.
- D. Eltis; A. Borucki; D. Wheat (eds.). From the Galleons to the Highlands: Slave Trade Routes in the Spanish Americas. Albuquerque: University of New Mexico Press, 2020.
- D. Eltis; D. Richardson; Phil Misevich. Second and expanded edition of The Atlas of the Transatlantic Slave Trade. New Haven: Yale University Press, 2025.
- D. Eltis. Atlantic Cataclysm: Rethinking the Atlantic Slave Trades. Atlanta: Emory University, 2025.
