= Lorraine S. Symington =

British-American geneticist

Lorraine S. Symington FRS

Academic background
- Education: BSc, Biology, University of Sussex; PhD, Genetics, University of Glasgow
- Thesis: Transposon-encoded site-specific recombination
- Website: www.symingtonlab.com

Lorraine S. Symington FRS is a British-American geneticist. As the Harold S. Ginsberg Professor and Director of Graduate Studies of Microbiology & Immunology at Columbia University, her laboratory uses genetic, biochemical and molecular approaches to understand mechanisms of homology-directed double-strand break repair using the yeast Saccharomyces cerevisiae as an experimental system.

== Early life and education ==
Symington completed her Bachelor of Science degree from the University of Sussex and her PhD in genetics from the University of Glasgow. Following her graduating, she moved to North America and completed her postdoctoral training in DNA biochemistry with Richard Kolodner at Harvard Medical School and in yeast genetics with Tom Petes at the University of Chicago.

== Career ==
Symington joined the faculty at Columbia University in 1988. Throughout her tenure at Columbia, her laboratory uses genetic, biochemical and molecular approaches to understand mechanisms of homology-directed double-strand break repair using the yeast Saccharomyces cerevisiae as an experimental system. In 2018, Symington was elected to the American Academy of Arts and Sciences for her "major, lasting contributions toward our understanding of mechanisms of DNA-damage induced break repair." During the COVID-19 pandemic, Symington was elected to the National Academy of Sciences for her genetics research. She was elected a Fellow of the Royal Society in 2024.
