= Clare Yu =

American biophysicist and condensed matter physicist

Clare C. Yu
- Education: Princeton University
- Scientific career
- Fields: Biophysics, condensed matter physics, quantum physics
- Workplaces: University of California, Irvine Aspen Center for Physics
- Website: https://www.physics.uci.edu/people/clare-c-yu

Clare C. Yu is an American theoretical biophysicist and condensed matter physicist. She is Professor of Physics and Astronomy in the School of Physical Sciences at the University of California, Irvine (UCI). She is a Fellow of the American Physical Society, of the American Academy of Arts and Sciences, and of the American Association for the Advancement of Science. She is also a former Alfred P. Sloan Fellow, and a current Trustee of the Aspen Center for Physics.

== Early life ==
Yu came from an academic background. Her father was a professor of accounting and she grew up in a University town. Yu stated that her interest in science and reading began at 4 years old. She said that her mother used to read her science books about Newton and other topics. At 8 years old, she began to read more about science and decided that she wanted to be a physicist.

== Education and career ==
Yu received both an A.B. (1979) and a Ph.D. (1984) in Physics at Princeton University. She conducted postdoctoral research at the University of Illinois at Urbana-Champaign and at the Los Alamos National Laboratory. In 1989, she joined the faculty at the University of California, Irvine as a professor of physics and astronomy.

== Research ==
Yu’s work encompasses three areas of study: biophysics, condensed matter physics, and quantum physics.

In biophysics, Yu studies the intracellular transport of molecules using computer simulations. In developmental biology, she has used Monte Carlo simulations, particularly to investigate the development of the wing disc in Drosophila fruit flies and to study how, fundamentally, the organs and physical features of creatures emerge. Additionally, she has deployed statistical techniques like maximum entropy to study cancer immunotherapy, uncovering under what conditions immune cells infiltrate tumors. Along with this, she has been researching tumor microenvironments undergoing immunotherapy.

In condensed matter physics, Yu specializes in disordered systems while she focuses especially on glasses, she has researched the glass transition, Coulomb glasses, dipolar glasses, spin glasses, and the low temperature properties of glasses. Additionally, she has collaborated research in low-temperature spin dynamics in LAFO thin films.

Yu’s research in the field of quantum computation has explored how fluctuating electronic spins on the surface of Josephson junction qubits can produce magnetic noise, leading to decoherence of the qubit.

== Honors and awards ==
- 1991 – Alfred P. Sloan Fellow
- 2005 – Fellow of the American Physical Society
- 2019 – Fellow of the American Academy of Arts and Sciences
- 2020 – Fellow of the American Association for the Advancement of Science

Yu is currently a Trustee on the board of the Aspen Center for Physics.
