= Richard M. Rosenberg =

American banker

Richard Morris Rosenberg
- Born: April 21, 1930; Fall River, Massachusetts, United States
- Died: March 3, 2023 (aged 92)
- Education: Suffolk University, Golden Gate University (MBA)
- Occupations: Banker, business executive
- Known for: Former president of Crocker National Bank and Bank of America
- Spouse: Barbara Cohen (m. 1956)
- Children: 2

Richard Morris Rosenberg (1930–2023) was an American banker and business executive who served as president of Crocker National Bank and Bank of America.

== Early life ==
Rosenberg was born on April 21, 1930, in Fall River, Massachusetts. His father, Charles Rosenberg, was a World War I veteran and haberdasher, and his mother, Betty (Peckowitz) Rosenberg, was an immigrant from Russia. He graduated from Suffolk University in 1953 and served in the U.S. Navy during the Korean War, eventually attaining the rank of commander in the Naval Reserves. Later, he earned an MBA from Golden Gate University.

== Career ==
After marrying Barbara Cohen in 1956, Rosenberg began his banking career in 1959 at Crocker-Anglo in San Francisco. He later held executive positions at Wells Fargo and served as president of Crocker National Bank. He subsequently became president and chief operating officer of Seattle-First National Bank and Seafirst Corporation before joining Bank of America in 1987.

In 1990, he was appointed CEO and chairman of Bank of America. During his tenure, the bank merged with Security Pacific in 1992, a transaction that resulted in Bank of America becoming the second-largest bank in the United States. Rosenberg retired in 1996.

== Philanthropy ==
Following his retirement, he engaged in philanthropic activities. At Suffolk University, his contributions assisted in establishing the Rosenberg Institute for East Asian Studies. He also funded the Barbara and Richard M. Rosenberg Institute of Global Finance and the Barbara and Richard M. Rosenberg Professor of Global Finance at the Brandeis International Business School.
