= Shelley Berger =

American geneticist

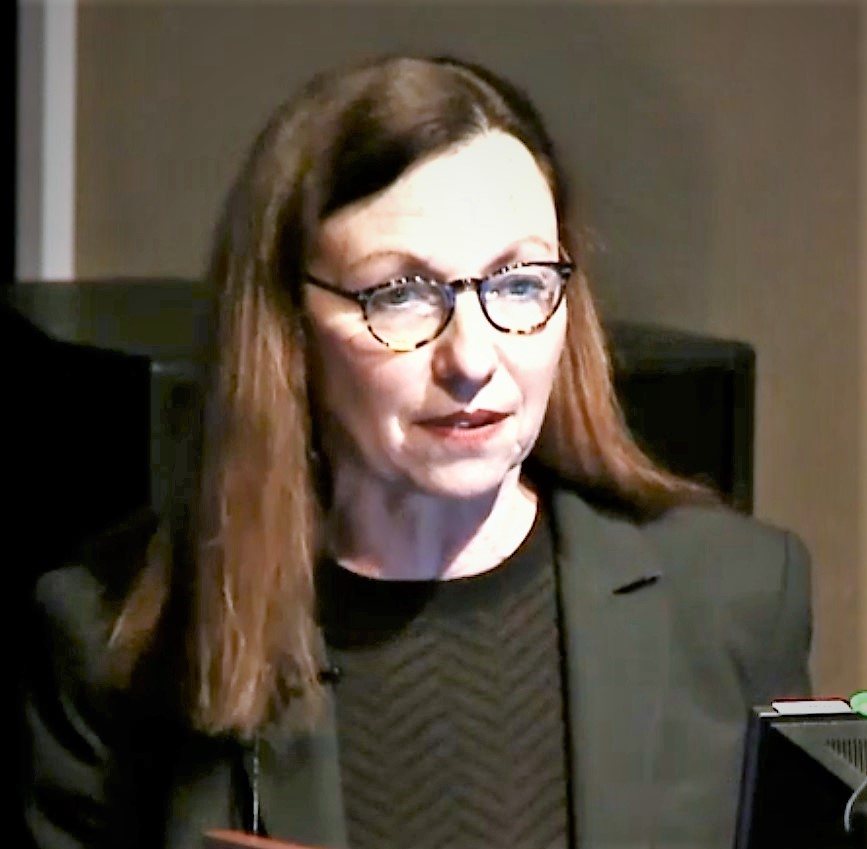
- Berger lectures for the National Institutes of Health in 2014
- Education: University of Michigan Ann Arbor
- Scientific career
- Workplaces: University of Pennsylvania; Wistar Institute

Shelley L. Berger is the Daniel S. Och Professor of cell and developmental biology at the University of Pennsylvania School of Medicine. Her research focuses on epigenetics.

== Education and career ==
Berger graduated from the University of Michigan Ann Arbor with a BS in biology in 1982 and a PhD in cell and molecular biology in 1987. She did a postdoctoral fellowship at MIT. Prior to joining the University of Pennsylvania faculty, she was the Hilary Koprowski Professor at the Wistar Institute in Philadelphia.

=== Awards ===
- Elected fellow of the American Association for Advancement of Science
- Elected member of the National Academy of Medicine
- Elected member of American Academy of Arts and Sciences
- 2018 Elected member of the National Academy of Sciences

== Lab ==
Berger's lab is currently focused on histone modification and how this can affect senescence and the aging of cells, cancer development, cognitive ability (specifically memorization and learning skills), and the behavior of organisms as a whole. Berger's research is about epigenetics, but zooms in on histones and modifications in the post-translation stage, regarding chromatin and the p53 gene (a tumor suppressor).
