= Beverly Davidson =

American geneticist

Academic background
- Education: BS, 1981, Nebraska Wesleyan University; PhD, Biological Chemistry, 1987, University of Michigan
- Thesis: The Genetic Basis of Hypoxanthine Guanine Phosphoribosyltransferase Deficiency States in Humans (1988)

Beverly L. Davidson is an American geneticist. She is the director of the Raymond G. Perelman Center for Cellular and Molecular Therapeutics at Children's Hospital of Philadelphia. In this role, she investigates gene therapy for neurodegenerative diseases, specifically Huntington's.

In 2019, Davidson was elected a member of the National Academy of Medicine for her "being on the forefront of developing innovative therapies and medicines for fatal, inherited brain disorders, which are engineered to either remove toxic proteins or replace missing proteins, and for improving or preventing disease progression."

== Early life and education ==
Davidson earned her Bachelor of Science degree from Nebraska Wesleyan University and her PhD in Biological Chemistry from the University of Michigan. Davidson's thesis was conducted under the guidance of William Kelley and titled "The Genetic Basis of Hypoxanthine Guanine Phosphoribosyltransferase Deficiency States in Humans."

== Career ==
After graduate school, Davidson joined the faculty at the University of Iowa's Department of Internal Medicine. In this role, she led the first study which used small RNA molecules packed into viruses to treat mice with an inherited disease. When they injected interfering RNA into the brains of the mice, their motor coordination improved, brain morphology was restored, and pathology decreased. This subsequently proved that gene therapy in mice could prevent the physical symptoms and neurological damage related to Huntington's disease. The following year, as the Roy J. Carver Biomedical Research Chair, her research team used RNA to reduce levels of the HD protein in mice which significantly improved the movement and neurological abnormalities normally associated with the disease. In recognition of her accomplishments, Davidson was the recipient of a 2007 Regents Award for Faculty Excellence from the university.

In her final year with the University of Iowa, Davidson co-launched Spark Therapeutics with Jean Bennett to develop "gene-based medicines for a wide range of debilitating diseases" in collaboration with the Children's Hospital of Philadelphia (CHOP). She subsequently left the University of Iowa in 2014 to accept a position as the director of the Center for Cellular and Molecular Therapeutics at CHOP. As the director, Davidson helped Spark launch their first gene therapy program targeting a disease of the central nervous system. Following this, Davidson was elected to the American Academy of Arts and Sciences and named director of CHOP's underground clinical manufacturing facility in the Colket Translational Research Building.

As the chief scientific strategy officer and director of the Raymond G. Perelman Center for Cellular and Molecular Therapeutics, Davidson elected vice president of the board of directors for the American Society of Gene and Cell Therapy. In 2019, Davidson was elected a member of the National Academy of Medicine for her "being on the forefront of developing innovative therapies and medicines for fatal, inherited brain disorders, which are engineered to either remove toxic proteins or replace missing proteins, and for improving or preventing disease progression."
