= Patricia Loew =

Ojibwe journalist, academic, historian (born 1952)

- Born: 1952 (age 73–74)
- Citizenship: Bad River Band of the Lake Superior Tribe of Chippewa Indians of the Lake Superior Ojibwe
- Education: University of Wisconsin
- Occupations: Journalist; scholar; historian; filmmaker
- Awards: Martin Luther King Jr. Heritage Award

Academic background
- Thesis: Newspapers and the Lake Superior Chippewa in the "unProgressive" Era (1998)

Academic work
- Institutions: University of Wisconsin, Northwestern University

Patricia, "Patty" Loew (born 1952) is a journalist, professor, author, and community historian, broadcaster, documentary film maker, academic and advocate. She has written extensively about Ojibwe treaty rights, sovereignty and the role of Native American media in communicating Indigenous world views.

== Early life ==
Patty Loew grew up in the north side of Milwaukee, Wisconsin. Her grandfather, Edward DeNomie, a World War I veteran, lived for many years with her family.

== Education ==
Loew pursued her BA in Mass Communications at University of Wisconsin La Crosse (1974). She later completed her Master's and PhD in Mass Communications at the University of Wisconsin Madison in 1992 and 1998 respectively.

== Career ==
Loew began her career as a journalist in La Crosse, beginning with television and radio reporting. She later moved to Madison Wisconsin where she eventually worked her way to the anchor's desk at ABC affiliate WKOW-TV. She covered environmental issues and became a popular local news personality. When fishing rights for tribes in Wisconsin surfaced in the 1980s, Loew became a prominent journalist covering the issue.

In the 1990s, Loew returned to university to pursue graduate studies. She was later hired as a professor in 1999 and has published award-winning books and textbooks. She also engaged in public scholarship, co-hosting a Wisconsin Public Television program "Weekend" and produced documentaries focused on Indigenous history and culture. She is currently Professor at the Medill School of Journalism at Northwestern University and is director of the Center for Native American and Indigenous Research.

Loew has led Tribal Youth Media initiative since 2006, which fosters digital storytelling skills within the next generation of Indigenous youth. Loew has served on the board of UNITY: Journalists for Diversity. In 2019 she was inducted into the American Academy of Arts and Sciences and received Wisconsin's Martin Luther King Jr. Heritage Award.

== Selected scholarship and publications ==
=== Books ===
- Loew, Patty (2014). Seventh generation earth ethics : native voices of Wisconsin. Madison, WI. ISBN 978-0-87020-675-7. OCLC 884909100.
- Loew, Patty (2013). Indian nations of Wisconsin : histories of endurance and renewal (Second ed.). Madison. ISBN 978-0-87020-594-1. OCLC 882234611.
- Loew, Patty (2015). Native people of Wisconsin (Revised and expanded ed.). Madison, WI. ISBN 978-0-87020-751-8. OCLC 910993799.

=== Documentary films ===
- Sacred Stick (2013)
- Protect Our Future (2013–2014)
- Naanan Nimiseyug (My Five Sisters) (2012)
- After The Storm (2010)
- Way of the Warrior (2007)
- Great Lakes Legacy (2007)
- Home Away from Home (1996)
- The Spring of Discontent (1990)
- Fishing for Answers : How to Reduce the Contaminants in Sport Fish (1989)
- On Wisconsin (1988)
- No Word for Goodbye (1986)

=== Journal articles ===
- Loew, Patty, “A Digital Gift to the Seventh Generation,” Yukhika-latuhse: She Tells Us Stories, Oneida Nation Native Journal, Fall 2013.
- Loew, Patty; Thannum, James (2011). "After the Storm: Ojibwe Treaty Rights Twenty-Five Years after the Voigt Decision". American Indian Quarterly. 35 (2): 161–191. doi:10.5250/amerindiquar.35.2.0161. ISSN 0095-182X. JSTOR 10.5250/amerindiquar.35.2.0161. S2CID 159166284.
- Tynan, Tim and Loew, Patty “Organic Video Approach: Using New Media to Engage Native Youth in Science," American Indian Culture and Research Journal, Volume 34, Number 4 (winter 2010)
- Loew, Patty; Mella, Kelly (2005). "Black Ink and the New Red Power: Native American Newspapers and Tribal Sovereignty". Journalism & Communication Monographs. 7 (3): 99–142. doi:10.1177/152263790500700301. ISSN 1522-6379. S2CID 144662802.
- Loew, Patty, “Tinker to Evers to Chief: Baseball From Indian Country, Wisconsin Magazine of History, Vol. 87, Number 3 (spring 2004).
- Loew, Patty, “Back of the Homefront: Oral Histories of Native American and African-American Wisconsin Women During World War Two,” Wisconsin Magazine of History, Vol 82, Number 2 (winter 1998–99).
- Loew, Patty (1998-01-01). "Natives, Newspapers, and "Fighting Bob"". Journalism History. 23 (4): 149–158. doi:10.1080/00947679.1998.12062479. ISSN 0094-7679.
- Loew, Patty (1997). "Hidden Transcripts in the Chippewa Treaty Rights Struggle: A Twice Told Story. Race, Resistance, and the Politics of Power". American Indian Quarterly. 21 (4): 713–728. doi:10.2307/1185721. ISSN 0095-182X. JSTOR 1185721.

== Awards and honours ==
- American Academy of Arts and Sciences (2019)
- Wisconsin Martin Luther King Jr. Heritage Award (2019)
- Distinguished Alumni Award, University of Wisconsin La Crosse (2011)
- Outstanding Woman of Color, University Wisconsin Madison (2009–2010)
- Midwest Book Award for Culture (2014)
- Honorary Doctorate, Edgewood College (2003)
- Honorary Doctorate, Northland College (2003)
- Wisconsin Library Association Outstanding Book Award (2002)
