= Tina Henkin =

Professor of microbiology

Tina Marilyn Henkin is a professor of microbiology emeritus, and former Distinguished University Professor, and Robert W. and Estelle S. Bingham Professor of Biological Sciences at Ohio State University. She is a Fellow of the American Association for the Advancement of Science and the American Academy of Microbiology, and was elected as a member of the American Academy of Arts and Sciences and the National Academy of Sciences. In 2019, she was reappointed to her Bingham professorship. Henkin researches how bacterial cells modulate gene expression in response to changes in their environment through effects on RNA structure via RNA regulatory elements called riboswitches, primarily using Bacillus subtilis as a model. She is coauthor of the bacterial genetics textbook Snyder & Champness Molecular Genetics of Bacteria, published by the American Society of Microbiology Press.
