= Carter G. Phillips =

Carter G. Phillips is an American lawyer specializing in appellate litigation, regulatory law, and constitutional law. He is a partner at Sidley Austin. He is also an adjunct professor at Northwestern University Pritzker School of Law and co-director of the Carter G. Phillips/Sidley Austin LLP Supreme Court Clinic. Phillips was elected a Fellow of the American Academy of Arts and Sciences in 2017.

== Early life and education ==
Phillips was born in Canton, Ohio. He received a Bachelor of Arts in political science from Ohio State University in 1973. He earned a Master of Arts in political science from Northwestern University in 1975 and a Juris Doctor from Northwestern University School of Law in 1977.

== Career ==
Phillips served as a law clerk to Judge Robert A. Sprecher of the United States Court of Appeals for the Seventh Circuit from 1977 to 1978. He then clerked for Chief Justice Warren E. Burger of the Supreme Court of the United States from 1978 to 1979.

From 1979 to 1981, Phillips was an assistant professor of law at the University of Illinois College of Law, where he taught civil procedure, administrative law, and natural-resources law. He subsequently served as an assistant to the Solicitor General of the United States from 1981 to 1984.

Phillips joined Sidley & Austin in Washington, D.C., as an associate in 1984 and became a partner in 1986. He was managing partner of the firm's Washington, D.C., office from 1995 to 2012 and chair of Sidley Austin's executive committee from 2012 to 2017.

Phillips is an adjunct professor at Northwestern University Pritzker School of Law and a co-director of the Carter G. Phillips/Sidley Austin LLP Supreme Court Clinic. He helped establish the clinic in 2006. In 2024, Northwestern named its Carter G. Phillips Center for Supreme Court and Appellate Advocacy in his honor.

Phillips has served as president of the Supreme Court Historical Society. He has also served as chair of the advisory committee of the United States Court of Appeals for the Federal Circuit
