= Donald C. Hood =

- Born: 1942 (age 83–84); Mineola, New York
- Education: Binghamton University; Brown University
- Scientific career
- Workplaces: Columbia University

Donald Charles Hood (born 1942) is the James F. Bender Professor in Psychology and Professor of Ophthalmic Science in the Department of Psychology at Columbia University. He is a former editor-in-chief of Investigative Ophthalmology & Visual Science.

Hood was born in 1942 in Mineola, New York.

Hood earned his undergraduate degree from Binghamton University in 1965 and his Ph.D. from Brown University in 1969. He served as vice president for the Arts and Sciences at Columbia University from 1982 to 1987 and on Brown University's Board of Fellows from 2002 to 2012.

== Honors and awards ==
- Member, Society of Experimental Psychologists, 1992
- Honorary Sc.D., Smith College, 2000
- Fellow, American Academy of Arts and Sciences, 2013
- Doctor of Humane Letters, Brown University, 2017
- Honorary Sc.D., SUNY College of Optometry, 2019
