= Juanita Merchant =

American gastroenterologist and physiology researcher

Juanita L. Merchant
- Education: Stanford University; Yale University; Massachusetts General Hospital; University of California, Los Angeles (UCLA)
- Known for: Research on gastric response to chronic inflammation
- Scientific career
- Fields: Medicine; Physiology; Gastroenterology
- Workplaces: University of Michigan; University of Arizona

Juanita L. Merchant is an American gastroenterologist and physiology researcher who has contributed to understanding of gastric response to chronic inflammation. She is currently the chief of the University of Arizona Division of Gastroenterology and Hepatology. Merchant was elected to the National Academy of Medicine in 2008, and appointed an inaugural member of the NIH Council of Councils.

== Early life and education ==
Merchant grew up in Los Angeles. Her mother was an elementary school teacher. She attended Stanford University, where she received her B.S. degree in biology. She went on to Yale University where she received both her M.D. and Ph.D. degrees in 1984. Merchant was the first African-American to earn a dual degree in medicine and cell biology from the Yale School of Medicine. She completed her internal medicine residency and a research fellowship in gastroenterology at the Massachusetts General Hospital in Boston and her clinical fellowship in gastroenterology at UCLA. Merchant is board certified by the American Board of Internal Medicine in both Internal Medicine (1987) and Gastroenterology (1993).

== Research and career ==
After completing her clinical fellowship at UCLA in 1991, Merchant was recruited to the University of Michigan, where she was the H. Marvin Pollard Professor of Gastrointestinal Sciences in Internal Medicine in the Division of Gastroenterology and Molecular and Integrative Physiology. She additionally held a faculty appointment in the University of Michigan Cellular and Molecular Biology Graduate Program. In 1994, Merchant was selected as an Howard Hughes Medical Institute (HHMI) Investigator; this appointment provided support for her research on gastrointestinal-tract cell growth and differentiation until 2002. In 2018, Merchant joined the faculty at the University of Arizona College of Medicine, where she is the chief of the UA Division of Gastroenterology and Hepatology as well as a professor of medicine in the UA Department of Medicine and a member of the Cancer Biology Research Program at the UA Cancer Center.

Merchant's research focuses on molecular mechanisms of gastric cancer biology, in particular the pathways involved in chronic inflammation processes. Since 1993, Merchant has been funded by NIDDK for a project on the "Transcriptional Control of Gastrin," which focuses on understanding the origin of gastrinomas. In 2002, Merchant and collaborators found that antibiotics did a better job of treating gastritis in mice than blocking acid production with proton pump inhibitors. Merchant holds a patent (granted in 2016) for a biomarker that can help diagnose Irritable Bowel Syndrome (IBS) and Crohn's Disease. In 2018, Merchant was awarded additional NIH funding to study "MDSC Polarization and Helicobacter-Induced Gastric Metaplasia;" this grant will support the study of the role of the Sonic hedgehog (SHH) gene in gastric cancer. Her research has led to authorship or co-authorship on over 100 research publications and she has been the editor or co-editor of multiple books, such as the textbook Physiology of the Gastrointestinal Tract.

== Awards and honors ==
- 1998 Elected to the American Society for Clinical Investigation
- 1998 Robert and Sally Funderburg Award for Gastric Cancer, American Gastroenterological Association
- 2008 Elected to National Academy of Medicine
- 2008-2016 Member of the NIH Council of Councils
- 2008 Outstanding AGA Women in Science Honoree
- 2012 Harold R. Johnson Award for Diversity, University of Michigan
- 2014 AGA Institute Council Section Research Mentor Award in Cellular & Molecular Gastroenterology
- 2014 Sarah Goddard Power Award, University of Michigan
- 2016-2021 Member of the NIDDK Board of Scientific Counselors
- 2017 Distinguished Achievement Award in Basic Science, American Gastroenterological Association
- 2019-2022 Member of National Academy of Medicine Governing Council
