= Amanda Woodward =

American psychologist

- Education: Swarthmore College; Stanford University
- Occupation: Psychologist

Amanda Woodward is Dean of the Division of the Social Sciences and the William S. Gray Professor of Psychology at the University of Chicago. Her research investigates infant social cognition and early language development including the understanding of goal-directed actions, agency, theory of mind, and learning from social partners. She is a fellow of the American Academy of Arts and Sciences.

== Education ==
Woodward completed her undergraduate education at Swarthmore College, where she earned a Bachelor of Arts in Psychology with high honors in 1987. She went on to pursue graduate studies in psychology at Stanford University, receiving her Ph.D. in 1992. Following her doctoral training, she conducted postdoctoral research in the Department of Psychology at Cornell University from 1992 to 1993.

== Academic career ==
Woodward joined the faculty of the University of Chicago in 1993 as an Assistant Professor of Psychology and was promoted to Associate Professor in 2000. From 2005 to 2010, she was also a Professor in the Department of Psychology and the Program in Neuroscience and Cognitive Science at the University of Maryland, College Park. Upon returning to the University of Chicago, she held the William S. Gray Professorship of Psychology from 2010 to 2016 and was named William S. Gray Distinguished Service Professor in 2017.

In addition to her research and teaching, Woodward has held several academic leadership positions at the University of Chicago. She served as Chair of the Department of Psychology from 2013 to 2015, Deputy Dean for Faculty Affairs in the Division of the Social Sciences from 2015 to 2017, and Interim Dean of the Division from 2017 to 2018. In 2018, she was appointed Dean of the Division of the Social Sciences.

She has served as President of the Cognitive Development Society and has held leadership roles in organizations including the International Congress on Infant Studies. She currently serves on the Board of Trustees of NORC at the University of Chicago and previously served on the Board of the University of Chicago Laboratory Schools.

Her editorial service has included appointments as an associate editor and editorial board member for journals such as Psychological Bulletin, Developmental Psychology, Cognitive Development, and Developmental Science. She has also served on grant review panels for the National Science Foundation and the National Institutes of Health.

In 2014, Woodward was a member of the committee that drafted the Chicago Principles, the University of Chicago's statement on freedom of expression.

== Research ==
Woodward's research focuses on developmental psychology, particularly the origins and development of social cognition in infancy and early childhood. Her work examines how infants come to understand other people as intentional, goal-directed agents and has contributed significantly to theories of early social and cognitive development.

A major theme of her research is infants' understanding of goal-directed action. Through experimental studies, she has investigated how young children interpret actions in terms of underlying goals and intentions, distinguish between agents and non-agents, and use social information to predict and explain behavior. Her findings have been influential in demonstrating that key aspects of social cognition emerge during the first year of life, earlier than many theories had previously proposed.

Woodward's research has also explored social learning and the development of interpersonal understanding. She has examined how infants and young children perceive social relationships, respond to communicative cues, and learn from others. More recent work has investigated the influence of cultural and community contexts on children's social learning, emphasizing the interaction between developmental processes and environmental experience.

== Awards and honors ==
She was elected a Fellow of the American Academy of Arts and Sciences in 2014 and a Fellow of the American Association for the Advancement of Science in 2022. She received the Ann L. Brown Award for Excellence in Developmental Research in 2014 and was elected a Fellow of the Association for Psychological Science in 2007 and a Fellow of the American Psychological Association in 2005.

In 2000, she received the Boyd McCandless Award from the American Psychological Association's Division of Developmental Psychology.
