= Esther Mwaikambo =

Tanzanian medical doctor (born 1940)

Esther Daniel Mwaikambo (born 1940) is a Tanzanian medical doctor. She is a senior paedriatician and Professor of Paediatrics and Child Health at the Hubert Kairuki Memorial University.

== Life ==
Mwaikambo graduated MD from the Peoples' Friendship University of Russia in 1969. As Tanzania's first female doctor, the Swahili newspaper Uhuru profiled her in a series 'women of today's Tanzania'. She gained a Master of Medicine (Paediatrics) from the University of Dar es Salaam in 1977. In 1982 she gained a Diploma in childhood infectious diseases and immunology from the Institute of Child Health in London, and in 1995 she gained a Certificate in Behavioural Sciences from Harvard University.

In 1987 Mwaikambo founded the medical women association of Tanzania, using the association to drive Tanzania's breast cancer program.

From 2001 to 2012 Mwaikambo served as chair of the Board of Research on Poverty Alleviation (REPOA). In October 2009 she was Harvard Distinguished Africa Lecturer, lecturing on the challenges of establishing a medical university in Tanzania. As President of the Tanzania Academy of Science, Mwaikambo called for Tanzanian media to promote local scientific innovations.

In 2018 Esther Mwaikambo was elected as an International Honorary Member of the American Academy of Arts and Sciences.

== Works ==
- 'A Review of Maternal and Child Health Services in Rural Tanzania'
