= Michael Botchan =

American researcher

- Education: New York University (B.S.), University of California, Berkeley (Ph.D.)
- Scientific career
- Fields: Molecular biology
- Workplaces: University of California, Berkeley
- Doctoral advisor: John E. Hearst
- Website: mcb.berkeley.edu/labs/botchan/

Michael Botchan is a professor of biochemistry and molecular biology at the University of California, Berkeley, where his research focuses on regulation of DNA replication during cell division. Botchan is a member of the United States National Academy of Sciences and the American Academy of Arts and Sciences and was appointed as the dean of the university's Division of Biological Sciences in 2017.

== Education and academic career ==
Botchan attended New York University as an undergraduate and received his bachelor's degree in biology in 1967. He received his Ph.D. in biophysics from the University of California, Berkeley in 1972. He then became a postdoctoral fellow and subsequently a staff scientist at the Cold Spring Harbor Laboratory. In 1980, he joined the faculty at Berkeley, and has subsequently served as the co-chair of the Department of Molecular and Cell Biology. He was appointed the interim dean of the Division of Biological Sciences in 2017, and received a permanent appointment in 2017. He also serves as the chair of the Medical Advisory Board of the Howard Hughes Medical Institute.

== Awards and honors ==
Botchan was elected to the American Academy of Arts and Sciences in 2006 and to the United States National Academy of Sciences in 2008.

== Research ==
Work in Botchan's laboratory focuses on studying the regulation of DNA replication during cell division, using Drosophila embryos as a model organism. The group has been particularly interested in the mechanisms of genomic integration of DNA oncoviruses and in the characterization of the eukaryotic origin recognition complex.
