= Martine Roussel =

American oncologist

Martine F. Roussel (born 1950) is a molecular oncologist in the United States. She is a member of the National Academy of Sciences. Roussel works at the St. Jude Children's Research Hospital in Memphis, Tennessee.

== Career ==
Dr. Roussel earned a bachelor's degree in biology from the Université de Tours in 1971, a master's degree in biochemistry from the University of Paris VII in 1974, and a Ph.D. from the Université Lille I in 1978. In 1980, she joined the National Institutes of Health and the National Cancer Institute of Health as a Forgarty International postdoctoral fellow.

In 1983, Dr. Rousseljoined the faculty of St Jude's Children's Research Hospital and the University of Tennessee. She is a member at St. Jude Faculty specializing in Tumor Cell Biology and an Endowed Chair in Molecular Oncogenesis. She also became a Fellow at the American Academy of Arts & Sciences. At UT Memphis, she is a Professor in the Department of Molecular Sciences. Her research lab studies aggressive and difficult to treat pediatric brain tumors.

Since 2003, Dr. Roussel has been Vice President of the United States of Eurocancer, an organization with headquarters in Paris, France. She is Chair, Erasmus at the University of Sciences in Paris.

== Personal life ==
Roussel is married to fellow cancer scientist Chuck Sherr.
