= Jonathan N. Katz =

Statistician and social scientist

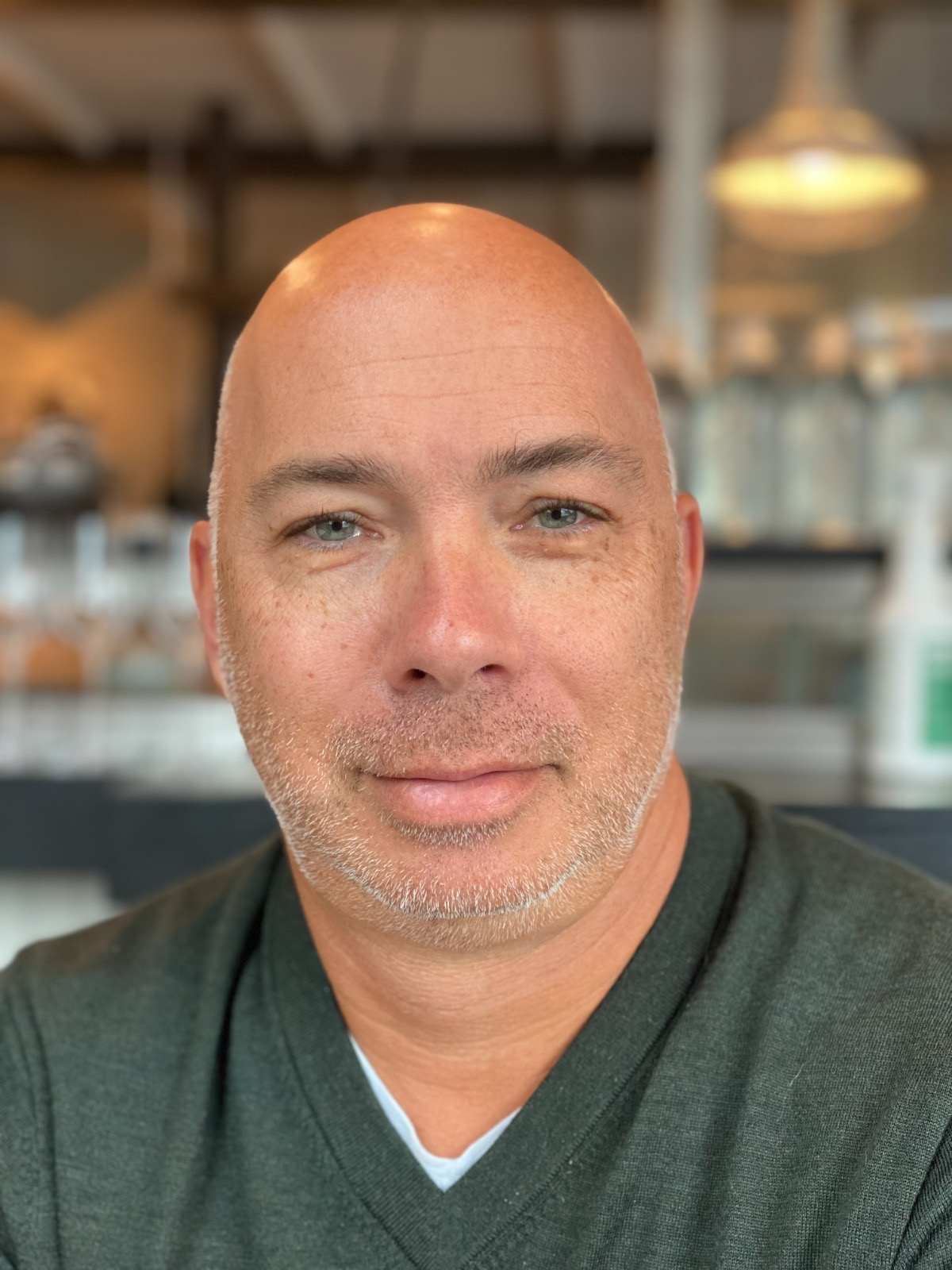
- Occupations: Statistician and social scientist

Academic background
- Education: S.B. in Applied Mathematics; M.A. in Political Science; Ph.D. in Political Science
- Alma mater: Massachusetts Institute of Technology; University of California, San Diego

Jonathan N. Katz is a statistician and social scientist. He is the Kay Sugahara Professor of Social Sciences and Statistics at the California Institute of Technology (Caltech).

Katz's research interests have included the interrelation of political statistics, economics, and science, with a focus on the establishment of statistical approaches employed in the discipline of social sciences and its practical applications regarding public policy and elections. He is an elected fellow of the American Academy of Arts and Sciences. He is also a fellow of and has received a Career Achievement Award from the Society for Political Methodology.

== Education ==
Katz completed his S.B. in Applied Mathematics from Massachusetts Institute of Technology in 1990. Later, he earned his M.A. and Ph.D. in Political Science from the University of California, San Diego in 1992 and 1995, respectively.

== Career ==
Katz worked at the University of Chicago as an assistant professor from 1998 to 2000. At Caltech, he held appointments, including assistant professor from 1995 to 1998, associate professor from April to August of 1998 and from 2000 to 2003, and professor between 2003 and 2009. Subsequently, he assumed the position of professor of Social Sciences and Statistics, which he maintained until 2011, and since 2012, he has been the Kay Sugahara Professor of Social Sciences and Statistics at the same institution.

From 2001 to 2006, Katz was the director of Graduate Studies in the Division of Humanities and Social Sciences. Later, between 2007 and 2014, he worked as chair of the Division of the Humanities and Social Sciences. Additionally, in 2013, he directed the Ronald and Maxine Linde Institute of Economic and Management Sciences, a position he retained until 2014. He was a co-editor of Political Analysis and was employed as a political analysis editor at the Society of Political Methodology. He also holds the position of deputy editor for Science Advances.

== Works ==
During his early research studies, together with Beck, Katz developed the PCSE (Panel-corrected standard errors) model and asserted the use of ordinary least squares (OLS) with PCSE for panel data. They also emphasized adjusting the data with a first-order autoregressive term or by including lagged dependent variables to deal with dynamic complications.

Together with Gary Cox, Katz worked on the incumbency advantages and categorized them into scare off/quality effect and available resources effects. They reported that due to the ease of availability of resources to incumbents, higher-quality candidates are most likely to get deterred given the higher opportunity costs. In a collaborative study, he worked on voter identification laws, employing individual-level data from the Current Population Survey to assess the turnout model and highlighting the differences between states with less and stricter identification requirements.

Katz co-authored a book titled Elbridge Gerry's Salamander: The Electoral Consequences of the Reapportionment Revolution, in which he investigated the impact of judicial polarization on redistricting outcomes in the 1960s, suggesting that the reapportionment revolution indirectly created three fundamental changes in congressional elections. John D. Griffin from the University of Notre Dame called it a "well-written" and "theoretically and empirically rigorous" book. However, he said that "heightened competition in Democratic primaries post-Wesberry" is an observable implication of the theory that is "not examined" by the authors. Moreover, Iain McLean described it as the "best industry-standard political science" book. At the same time, he also stated that authors do not consider the South, where the "apportionment revolution had the most impact", and that they "deliberately omit the most interesting part of the action".

== Awards and honors ==
- 2008 – Fellow, Society for Political Methodology
- 2011 – Elected Fellow, American Academy of Arts and Sciences
- 2024 – Career Achievement Award, Society for Political Methodology

== Bibliography ==
=== Books ===
- Cox, Gary W.; Katz, Jonathan N. (2002). Elbridge Gerry's Salamander: The Electoral Consequences of the Reapportionment Revolution. Cambridge University Press. ISBN 9780521001540.

=== Selected articles ===
- Beck, Nathaniel; Katz, Jonathan N. (1995). "What to do (and not to do) with time-series cross-section data". American Political Science Review. 89 (3): 634–647. doi:10.2307/2082979. JSTOR 2082979.
- Beck, Nathaniel; Katz, Jonathan N. (1996). "Nuisance vs. substance: Specifying and estimating time-series-cross-section models". Political Analysis. 6 (1): 1–36. doi:10.1093/pan/6.1.1.
- Cox, Gary W.; Katz, Jonathan N. (1996). "Why did the incumbency advantage in US House elections grow?". American Journal of Political Science. 40 (2): 478–497. doi:10.2307/2111633. JSTOR 2111633.
- Beck, Nathaniel; Katz, Jonathan N.; Tucker, Richard (1998). "Taking time seriously: Time-series-cross-section analysis with a binary dependent variable". American Journal of Political Science. 42 (4): 1260–1288. doi:10.2307/2991857. JSTOR 2991857.
- Beck, Nathaniel; Katz, Jonathan N. (2011). "Modeling dynamics in time-series-cross-section political economy data". Annual Review of Political Science. 14 (1): 331–352. doi:10.1146/annurev-polisci-071510-103222.
