= Cynthia Wolberger =

American structural biologist

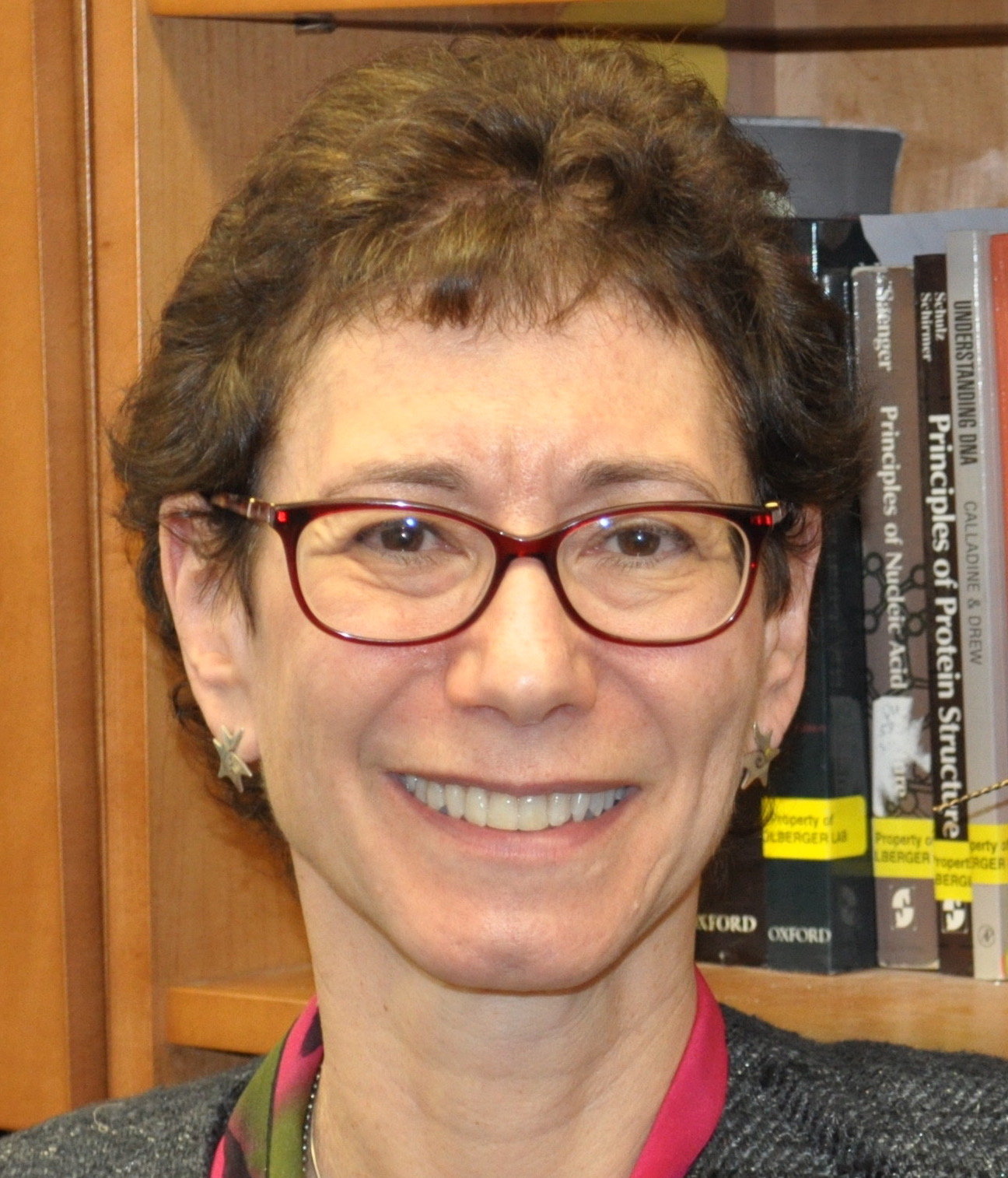

Cynthia Wolberger is an American structural biologist currently at Johns Hopkins University School of Medicine and an Elected Fellow of the American Association for the Advancement of Science. On April 19, 2019, she was elected as a member of the National Academy of Science among 100 new members and 25 foreign associates. She received her undergraduate degree in physics from Cornell University in 1979 and her Ph.D. in biophysics at Harvard University in 1987. She completed postdoctoral work at the University of California, San Francisco (1987–1989) and the Johns Hopkins School of Medicine (1989–1991). Her research concentrations include structural biology, ubiquitin signaling, and transcription regulation. Significant progress has been made by Wolberger in understanding the structural biology of gene and protein control.

== Honors and awards ==
- AACR Award for Outstanding Achievement in Chemistry in Cancer Research (2021)
- National Academy of Medicine (2021)
- National Academy of Sciences (2019)
- American Academy of Arts and Sciences Fellow (2019).
- Dorothy Crowfoot Hodgkin Award, Protein Society (2013)
- Howard Hughes Medical Institute Investigator (1994 - 2014)
- Junior Faculty Award, American Cancer Society (1993 - 1994)
- David and Lucile Packard Fellowship for Science and Engineering (1992 - 1997)
- Basil O'Connor Starter Scholar Award, March of Dimes (1992 - 1994)
- Damon Runyun - Fund Fellow, Walter Winchell Cancer Research (1987 - 1990)
- A.B. cum laude in Physics and With Distinction in all subjects (1979)
