= Susan Stokes =

Susan Stokes may refer to:

- Susan Stokes (political scientist), American political scientist
- Susan Stokes (politician), American politician from Kentucky

== See also ==
- Susan Stokes-Chapman, British author
