= Nanako Shigesada =

Japanese academic

- 重定南奈子
- Known for: Contributions to spatial ecology, models of species coexistence, studies on pine wilt disease.
- Awards: Akira Okubo Prize (2013)
- Scientific career
- Fields: Mathematical Biology, Theoretical Ecology
- Institutions: Nara Women's University, Kyoto University, Doshisha University
- Academic advisors: Ei Teramoto

Nanako Shigesada (重定南奈子, Shigesada Nanako) is a Professor Emeritus at Nara Women's University in Japan, most notable for her work in the fields of mathematical biology and theoretical ecology. Her established career in academia has seen many of her articles published to acclaim, as well as contributing to the education of researchers at Kyoto University and Doshisha University. Shigesada has served as the Research Supervisor for the Basic Research Program PRESTO in the research area "Innovative Models of Biological Processes and its Development", supported by the Japan Science and Technology Agency from 2007-2013. She has also served as Secretary General and President for The Japanese Society for Mathematical Biology. In 2013, she was awarded the Akira Okubo Prize.

== Career ==
In the 1970s Shigesada was an active member of Mumay Tansky, a group composed of Shigesasda and colleagues Ei Teramoto, Hiroshi Ashida, Hisao Nakajima, Kohkichi Kawasaki, and Norio Yamamura. The group, organized by Teramoto, published papers on structure, stability and efficiency of ecosystems.

In 1979, Shigesada focused on the observational study of the spatial distribution of ant lions by ecologist Masaaki Morisita. She studied the concept of the structures of experience and consciousness (phenomenology) with regards to environmental density and the degree to which a habitat might be unfavorable. She introduced a model that combined population pressure, due to mutual interference between individuals, with environmental potential. Shigesada extended Morisita's work, explaining how coexistence of competing species can arise through spatial segregation.

In the last twenty years, Shigesada has studied pine wilt disease which is caused by the pinewood roundworm with a pine sawyer beetle as vector. Through the study of population dynamics, she estimated beetle densities and parameter values, finding that there is a threshold host density above which the disease can spread, and that the minimum density critically depends on the eradication rate.

== Notable works ==
| Title | Year |
|---|---|
| Biological invasions: theory and practice | 1997 |
| Spatial segregation of interacting species | 1979 |
| Modeling stratified diffusion in biological invasions | 1995 |
| Traveling Periodic Waves in Heterogeneous Environments | 1986 |
| Modeling the expansion of an introduced tree disease | 2000 |
| Invasion and the range expansion of species: effects of long-distance dispersal | 2002 |
| Modeling the spread of pine wilt disease caused by nematodes with pine sawyers as vector | 1999 |
