= Luis Parada (neuroscientist) =

Colombian developmental biologist and neuroscientist

Luis F. Parada
- Born: Bogotá, Colombia
- Education: University of Wisconsin; Massachusetts Institute of Technology
- Occupations: Neuroscientist, biologist

Luis Fernando Parada is a Colombian developmental biologist and neuroscientist who currently serves as Director of the Brain Tumor Center, Albert C. Foster Chair and American Cancer Society Research Professor at Memorial Sloan Kettering Cancer Center in New York City, New York.

== Biography ==
A native of Bogotá, Colombia, Parada received his BS in molecular biology from the University of Wisconsin and a PhD in Biology from Massachusetts Institute of Technology in 1985. After postdoctoral training at the Whitehead Institute in Cambridge, Massachusetts and Pasteur Institute in Paris, France, he began his scientific career heading the Molecular Embryology Section at the National Cancer Institute in Frederick, Maryland. Parada moved to University of Texas Southwestern Medical Center at Dallas in 1994, and founded the Center for Developmental Biology and was the Diana and Richard C. Strauss Distinguished Chair in Developmental Biology. He also served as Director of the Kent Waldrep Center for Basic Research on Nerve Growth and Regeneration. In 2015, he became Director of the Brain Tumor Center at Memorial Sloan Kettering Cancer Center in New York City, NY. where he also holds appointments in the Cancer Biology & Genetics Program, and the departments of Neurosurgery and Neurology

Parada's medical research emphasizes deciphering the mechanisms of brain development, associated disorders, and cancer biology, and has led to identification of molecules that inhibit nerve regeneration after injury. He identified and characterized Trk Receptor tyrosine kinases as physiological neurotrophin receptors. His laboratory uses genetic mouse models to study human disease including neurofibromatosis, cancers of the nervous system, cancer stem cells, autism, and neural development.

== Awards and honors ==
Among his honors, Parada was elected to the National Academy of Sciences' Institute of Medicine and the American Academy of Arts and Sciences in 2007, and as a fellow of the American Association for the Advancement of Science in 2008. He was elected to the National Academy of Sciences in 2011. He has held the title of American Cancer Society Basic Research Professor since 2003. Parada received the prestigious Javits Neuroscience Investigator Award from the National Institutes of Health in 2007.

== Selected works ==
- Parada, Luis F., et al. "Human EJ bladder carcinoma oncogene is homologue of Harvey sarcoma virus ras gene." Nature 297 (1982): 474-478.
- Parada, Luis F., et al. "Cooperation between gene encoding p53 tumour antigen and ras in cellular transformation." Nature. 1984 Dec 13-19;312(5995):649-51.
- Kaplan, David R., and Luis F. Parada, "The trk proto-oncogene product: a signal transducing receptor for nerve growth factor." Science 252.5005 (1991): 554-558.
- Steven G. Kernie, Daniel J. Liebl, Luis F. Parada. "BDNF regulates eating behavior and locomotor activity in mice." EMBO Journal (2000) 19, 1290-1300.
- Yuan Zhu, et al. "Neurofibromas in NF1: Schwann Cell Origin and Role of Tumor Environment." Science (2002) 296.5569: 920-922.
- Yuan Zhu, et al. "Early inactivation of p53 tumor suppressor gene cooperating with NF1 loss induces malignant astrocytoma." Cancer Cell 2005 Aug;8(2):119-30.
- Sheila Alcantara Llaguno, Jian Chen, et al. "Malignant Astrocytomas Originate from Neural Stem/Progenitor Cells in a Somatic Tumor Suppressor Mouse Model." Cancer Cell, 2009 Jan 6;15(1):45-56.
- Jian Chen, Yanjiao Li, et al. "A restricted cell population propagates glioblastoma growth after chemotherapy." Nature 488 (2012): 522-526.
