= Paul Howard Wise =

American pediatrician

Paul Howard Wise is an American pediatrician and child health policy scholar. He is the Richard E. Behrman Professor of Child Health and Society at the Stanford University School of Medicine and a senior fellow at the Freeman Spogli Institute for International Studies.

== Early life and education ==
Wise received an A.B. degree, summa cum laude, in Latin American studies from Cornell University in 1974. He earned an M.D. from Cornell University Medical College in 1978 and a Master of Public Health from the Harvard School of Public Health the same year. He completed pediatric training at Children's Hospital in Boston.

As an undergraduate in 1970, Wise travelled to Guatemala to volunteer at a children's hospital during the country's civil war; he has described the experience as formative in directing his later work towards children in conflict settings.

== Career ==
Wise was Director of Emergency and Primary Care Services at Children's Hospital, Boston, from 1981 to 1985. He directed the Harvard Institute for Reproductive and Child Health at Harvard Medical School from 1992 to 1996. He directed social and health policy research at Boston Medical Center from 1996 to 2003. From 2003 to 2004, he was Vice-Chief of the Division of Social Medicine and Health Inequalities at Brigham and Women's Hospital.

Wise joined Stanford University in 2004 as founding director of its Center for Policy, Outcomes, and Prevention. He became the Richard E. Behrman Professor of Child Health and Society in 2005. He is a professor of pediatrics in the Division of Neonatology and Developmental Medicine and a professor of health policy, and is co-director of the Stanford Center for Prematurity Research. He is a senior fellow at the Freeman Spogli Institute for International Studies, where he is core faculty at the Center on Democracy, Development and the Rule of Law and affiliated faculty at the Center for International Security and Cooperation.

== Research ==
Wise's research addresses health inequalities, child health policy, and global child health. His work on United States child health has addressed disparities in birth outcomes, regionalized specialty care for children, and Medicaid.

Wise leads the Children in Crisis Initiative at Stanford, which studies child health in areas of civil conflict and unstable governance. He was a co-author of The Mosul Trauma Response: A Case Study, a February 2018 report of the Johns Hopkins Center for Humanitarian Health assessing the World Health Organization-led system for treating injured civilians during the Battle of Mosul. Later in 2018, he worked with researchers at the Johns Hopkins Bloomberg School of Public Health to assess the cholera epidemic in Yemen. He was one of three editors, with Jennifer M. Welsh and Jaime Sepúlveda, of a 2023 issue of Dædalus on delivering humanitarian health services in violent conflict.

== Advisory and court-appointed roles ==
Wise served as Special Assistant to the U.S. Surgeon General and chaired the steering committee of the NIH Global Network for Women's and Children's Health Research. He was a member of the advisory council of the National Institute of Child Health and Human Development.

During the 2022 Russian invasion of Ukraine, Wise was a senior adviser to SAFER Ukraine, a St. Jude Global program that evacuated children with cancer from Ukraine for treatment abroad. He has visited the program's triage clinic in Poland on multiple occasions.

In July 2019, a U.S. federal court appointed Wise as a medical expert overseeing the treatment of migrant children in border custody. This role transitioned to the juvenile care monitor for two Border Patrol sectors in Texas from July 2022 through September 2025, a role that gave him authority to visit and report to the court on conditions in U.S. Customs and Border Protection facilities in the Rio Grande Valley and El Paso sectors. These reports were made public by the federal court. On August 17, 2026, the federal court appointed Wise as Independent Monitor for children in the custody of the Immigration and Customs Enforcement (ICE) family detention center in Dilley, Texas and in Customs and Border Protection detention facilities in its Rio Grande Valley, El Paso, and San Diego sectors.

== Awards and honours ==
Wise was elected a fellow of the American Academy of Arts and Sciences in 2018. In 2025, he received the Clifford G. Grulee Award, the highest honour of the American Academy of Pediatrics, presented on September 29, 2025, at the academy's National Conference in Denver.
