= Stephen G. Nichols =

American medievalist

- Born: Stephen George Nichols Jr. October 24, 1936 (age 90)
- Education: Dartmouth College, Yale University
- Occupation: Medievalist

Stephen George Nichols Jr. (born October 24, 1936) is an American medievalist.

Nichols earned a bachelor's degree from Dartmouth College and completed a doctorate in comparative literature from Yale University. Upon graduation, he began teaching at the University of California, Los Angeles. Two years later, Nichols joined the faculty of the University of Wisconsin–Madison, where he remained for three years. Between 1968 and 1985, Nichols taught at Dartmouth College, and was Edward Tuck Professor of French from 1984. He was named professor of Romance languages at the University of Pennsylvania in 1985, and appointed Edmund J. Kahn Distinguished Professor of Humanities, serving until 1992. Nichols left UPenn for Johns Hopkins University in 1992, holding the James M. Beall Professorship of French and Humanities until retirement in 2010.

Over the course of his career, Nichols has been awarded several fellowships and awards, including a Guggenheim Fellowship (1987), and, twice, the Humboldt Research Award (2008 and 2014). He was elected a fellow of the Medieval Academy of America in 1988, and the American Academy of Arts and Sciences in 2013. The government of France named him an officier of the Ordre des Arts et des Lettres.
