= Gabrielle Demange =

French economist

Gabrielle Demange is a French economist and currently a professor at the Paris School of Economics. She is on the council of the Econometric Society and a fellow on the CEPR.

She was the co-editor of Economic Theory from 1998 to 2004 and an associate editor of the Review of Economic Design. She is an honorary international member of the American Academy of Arts and Science. She has been elected as the president of the Game Theory Society, 2024–2026.

== Education and career ==
She obtained her PhD from the university of Paris IX in 1986. She started her career at the Ecole Polytechnique from 1986 to 1999. She then moved to Paris XIII to become a professor in 1988. She is currently an associate Chair Paris School of Economics and a director of studies at the EHESS.

She won the CNRS silver medal in 2015.

== Research and publications ==
Her has published papers in Econometrica, the Journal of Political Economy and Management Science. Her research mainly focuses on game theory, network theory and financial markets.

Her research has been published in Science Magazine, Le Monde and the Conversation.

== Selected bibliography ==
- Alkan, Ahmet; Demange, Gabrielle; Gale, David (1991). "Fair Allocation of Indivisible Goods and Criteria of Justice". Econometrica. 59 (4): 1023–1039.
- Demange, Gabrielle; Gale, David; Sotomayor, Marilda (1986-08-01). "Multi-Item Auctions". Journal of Political Economy. 94 (4): 863–872.
- Demange, Gabrielle (2016-12-08). "Contagion in Financial Networks: A Threat Index". Management Science. 64 (2): 955–970.
