= Mark Hochstrasser =

American biologist

Mark Hochstrasser is an American biologist, currently the Eugene Higgins Professor of Molecular Biophysics and Biochemistry and Professor of Molecular, Cellular, and Developmental Biology at Yale University. Hochstrasser's research group has made many important contributions to our understanding of eukaryotic cell biology, particularly discoveries on the ubiquitin-proteasome system and the small ubiquitin-like modifier (SUMO) protein. He was elected a Member of the National Academy of Sciences in 2025.

Hochstrasser is an Elected Fellow of both the American Association for the Advancement of Science and the American Academy of Arts and Sciences and is on the editorial board of the journals Cell, Genes and Development, and EMBO Journal.
