= Gerald Bruns =

American philosopher

- Born: April 10, 1938 (age 88)

Education
- Education: Marquette University (BA, MA); University of Virginia (PhD)

Philosophical work
- Era: 21st-century philosophy
- Region: Western philosophy
- School: Continental
- Institutions: University of Notre Dame; University of Iowa; Ohio State University
- Main interests: Modern and contemporary poetry and poetics, twentieth century experimental fiction, European philosophy since Heidegger

Gerald L. Bruns (born April 10, 1938) is an American literary scholar and philosopher and William P. & Hazel B. White Professor Emeritus of English at the University of Notre Dame. He is the author of ten books and has published nearly a hundred essays.

Bruns received his BA from Marquette University in 1960 and his PhD from the University of Virginia in 1965. He taught at Ohio State University, the University of Iowa, and University of Notre Dame.

Bruns was awarded a Guggenheim Fellowship twice (1974, 1985) and is a Fellow of the American Academy of Arts & Sciences.

== Books ==
- Modern Poetry and the Idea of Language, Yale University Press, 1974. 2nd ed. Dalkey Archive Press, 2001.
- Inventions: Writing, Textuality, and Understanding in Literary History, Yale University Press, 1982.
- Heidegger's Estrangements: Language, Truth, and Poetry in the Later Writings, Yale University Press, 1989.
- Hermeneutics Ancient and Modern, Yale University Press, 1992.
- Maurice Blanchot: The Refusal of Philosophy, The Johns Hopkins University Press, 1997. 2nd ed. 2005.
- Tragic Thoughts at the End of Philosophy: Language, Literature, and Ethical Theory, Northwestern University Press, 1999.
- The Material of Poetry: Sketches for a Philosophical Poetics, University of Georgia Press, 2005
- On the Anarchy of Poetry and Philosophy: A Guide for the Unruly, Fordham University Press, 2006
- On Ceasing to be Human, Stanford University Press, 2010
- What Are Poets For? An Anthropology of Contemporary Poetry and Poetics, University of Iowa Press, 2012
- Interruptions: The Fragmentary Aesthetic in Modern Literature, University of Alabama Press, 2018
