= Mark Groudine =

American radiation oncologist

Mark Groudine is an American radiation oncologist currently at Fred Hutchinson Cancer Research Center, a member of the National Academy of Sciences and an Elected Fellow of the American Association for the Advancement of Science and American Academy of Arts and Sciences. He also served on the Life Sciences jury for the Infosys Prize in 2015.
