= Daniel Rader =

American geneticist

Daniel James Rader is an American academic physician and the Seymour Gray Professor of Molecular Medicine in the Perelman School of Medicine at the University of Pennsylvania. He is also the chief of the Perelman School of Medicine's Division of Translational Medicine and Human Genetics and the director of its Preventive Cardiovascular Program. He is recognized for his research into the genetic underpinnings of atherosclerosis and lipoprotein metabolism. He is also a founding co-director of the Penn Medicine BioBank.

== Education and career ==
Rader received his bachelor's degree from Lehigh University in 1981 and his M.D. from the Medical College of Pennsylvania in 1984. In 1999, he was elected a member of the American Society for Clinical Investigation, and in 2011, he was named a member of the National Academy of Medicine. In 2017, he received the Award for Outstanding Work in Science as Related to Medicine from the American College of Physicians.
