= Patrick H. O'Farrell =

Canadian biologist

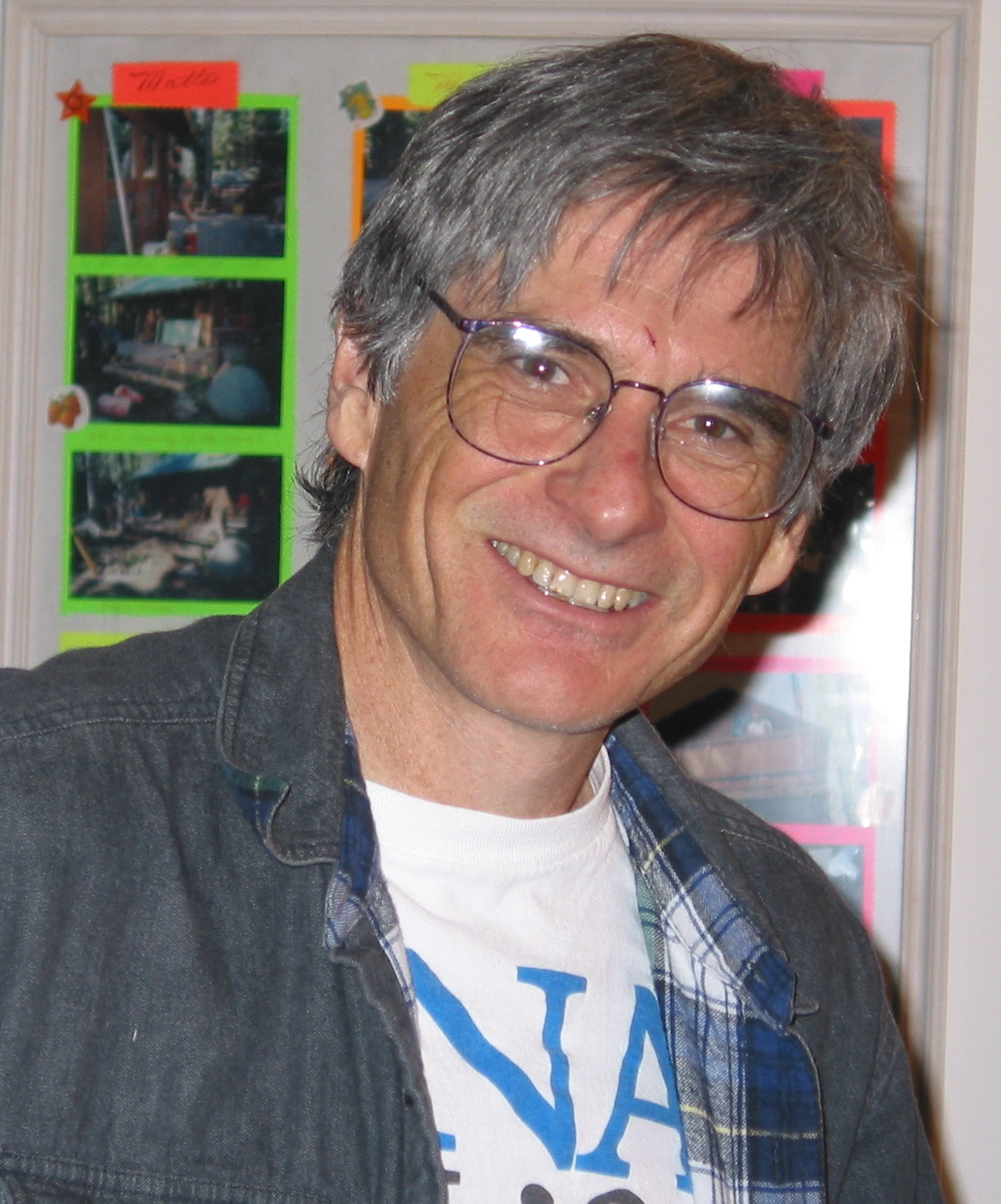
- O'Farrell in 2005
- Education: McGill University
- Known for: Two Dimensional Gel Electrophoresis
- Scientific career
- Fields: biology

Patrick H. O'Farrell is a molecular biologist who made crucial contribution to the development of 2-dimensional protein electrophoresis and Drosophila genetics. He is now a professor of Biochemistry at the University of California, San Francisco (UCSF) and has a h-index of 67.

== Education ==
O'Farrell received his bachelor of science in 1969 from McGill University in Montreal, Quebec. He then went on to graduate school at the University of Colorado Boulder.

== Major contributions ==
To optimize the resolution of the Electrophoresis of the proteins, O'Farrell needed to separate the proteins according to independent parameters. Two parameters were used:

- isoelectric focusing in the first dimension
- sodium dodecyl sulfate electrophoresis in the second dimension.

This permitted the simultaneous determination of molecular weight and isoelectric point for the proteins. Because the two parameters are unrelated, it was possible to obtain an almost uniform distribution of protein spots across the two-dimensional gel. Using his technique, O'Farrell was able to resolve 1100 different components from Escherichia coli and predicted his system should be capable of resolving up to 5000 proteins.
