= Richard Kolodner =

American geneticist

Richard D. Kolodner
- Education: University of California, Irvine
- Scientific career
- Fields: Oncology
- Workplaces: Ludwig Cancer Research; Dana–Farber Cancer Institute; UC San Diego School of Medicine

Richard David Kolodner is an American scientist with Ludwig Cancer Research who has made research contributions to the genetic basis for inherited susceptibility to common cancers. He is a Distinguished Professor of Cellular and Molecular Medicine at the UC San Diego School of Medicine. Kolodner is a member of the National Academy of Sciences and National Academy of Medicine, and he is a fellow of the American Academy of Arts and Sciences.

== Biography ==
Kolodner earned an undergraduate degree and a Ph.D. at University of California, Irvine. He completed a postdoctoral fellowship at Harvard Medical School, where he studied DNA replication. After joining the faculty at Harvard Medical School and Dana–Farber Cancer Institute in 1978 and establishing his own laboratory, he focused his research on DNA recombination. He became chair of the Charles A. Dana Division of Human Cancer Genetics in 1995. He joined the Ludwig Institute for Cancer Research, San Diego Branch in 1997.

Kolodner has made fundamental contributions to the understanding of the mechanisms of genetic recombination, DNA mismatch repair and the pathways that prevent genome instability. While studying DNA repair in bacteria and yeast, Kolodner identified two DNA mismatch repair genes, MSH2 and MLH1, that lead to 95 percent of hereditary colon cancer cases. In both cases, Kolodner reported his findings simultaneously with Bert Vogelstein at Johns Hopkins University. Kolodner also discovered that epigenetic silencing of MLH1 is the cause of much more common sporadic mismatch repair defective cancers.

Kolodner was the Director of Ludwig Cancer Research San Diego Branch, and he is a Distinguished Professor in the Department of Cellular and Molecular Medicine at the UC San Diego School of Medicine.

He was elected to the National Academy of Sciences in 2000. He has also been elected a fellow of the American Academy of Arts and Sciences and a member of the National Academy of Medicine. He is a past recipient of the Charles S. Mott Prize for Outstanding Research in Cancer Causation or Prevention, awarded by the General Motors Cancer Research Foundation and the Kirk A. Landon-AACR Prize in Basic Cancer Research.

Kolodner was one of six UCSD faculty members to sue the institution over a planned reduction in funding to the Ludwig Institute for Cancer Research.
