= Midwest Political Science Association =

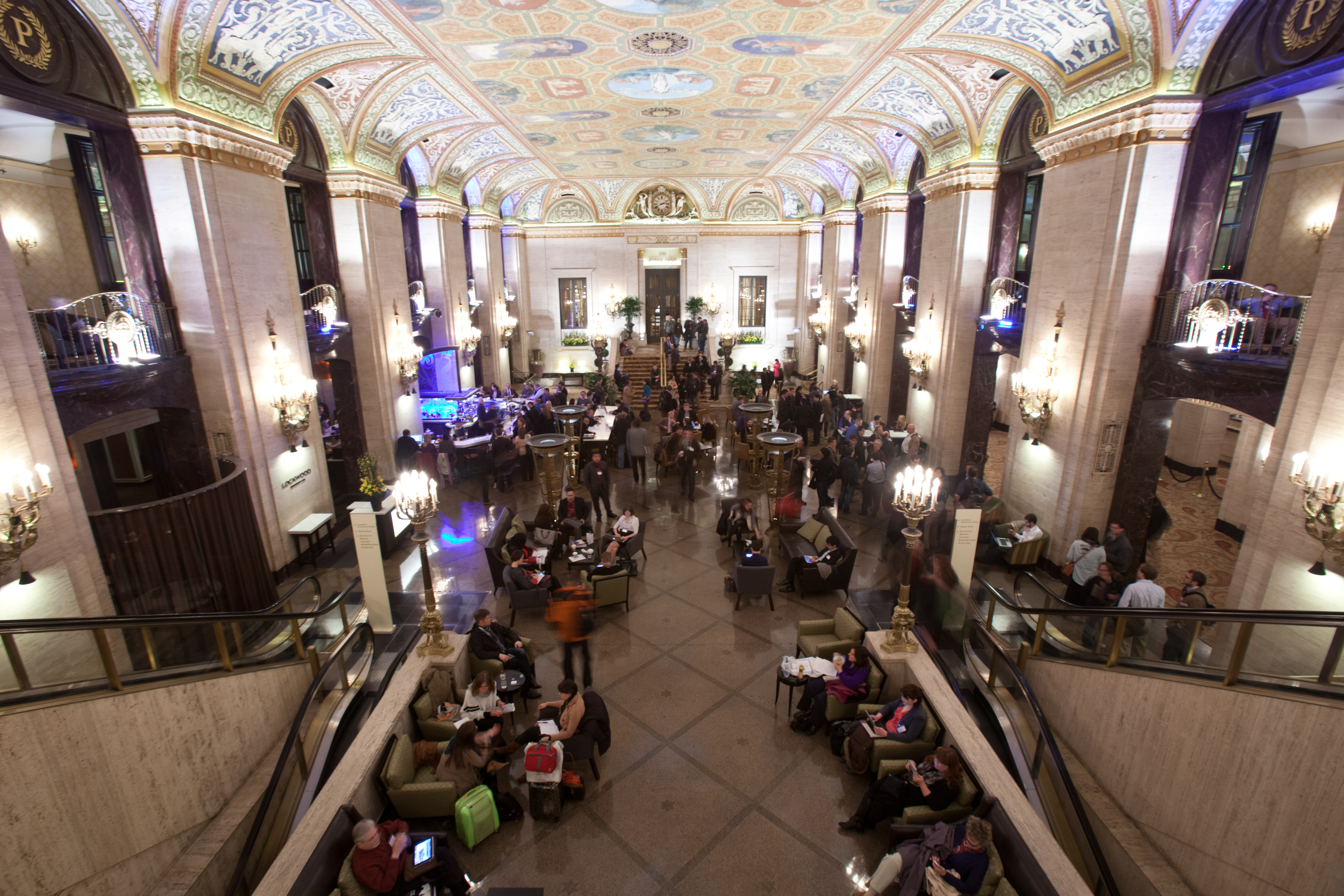
- MPSA at the Historic Palmer House Hotel in Chicago
- Abbreviation: MPSA
- Formation: 1939
- Purpose: to promote the professional study and teaching of political science, to facilitate communications between those engaged in such study, and to develop standards for and encourage research in theoretical and practical political problems.
- Headquarters: Bloomington, Indiana
- Location: Bloomington, Indiana
- Coordinates: 39.166287°N 86.534238°W
- Region served: United States
- Official language: English
- Main organ: Council
- Affiliations: Consortium of Social Science Associations, Member
- Website: www.mpsanet.org

The Midwest Political Science Association (MPSA) is a professional association of political scientists in the United States. It was founded in 1939, and publishes the American Journal of Political Science in conjunction with Rice University.

In April of each year, MPSA holds one of the largest political science conferences in the United States. In 2013, more than 5,700 presenters presented almost 4,700 papers at the conference. Traditionally, the MPSA Conference is held in Chicago, Illinois at Palmer House Hilton.

== Presidents ==
The presidents of the Midwest Political Science Association have been:

- James K. Pollock, University of Michigan, 1939
- W.H.C. Laves, University of Chicago, 1940
- Francis G. Wilson, University of Illinois, 1941
- John E. Briggs, University of Iowa, 1942
- Howard White, Miami University, 1943–47
- Harold Zink, DePauw University, 1948
- Llewellyn Pfankuchen, University of Wisconsin, 1949
- Harold M. Door, University of Michigan, 1950
- Charles M. Kneier, University of Illinois, 1951
- Harold M. Vinacke, University of Cincinnati, 1952
- Kirk H. Porter, University of Iowa, 1953
- Harry W. Voltmer, DePauw University, 1954
- Asher Christensen, University of Minnesota, 1955
- Edward Buehrig, Indiana University, 1955 (Acting President)
- David Fellman, University of Wisconsin, 1956
- Wilfred E. Binkley, Ohio Northern University, 1957
- Clarence A. Berdahl, University of Illinois, 1958
- Jasper B. Shannon, University of Nebraska, 1959
- Amry Vandenbosch, University of Kentucky, 1960
- Lloyd M. Short, University of Minnesota, 1961
- Richard Spencer, Coe College, 1962
- E. Allen Helms, Ohio State University, 1963
- William O. Farber, University of South Dakota, 1964
- John E. Stoner, Indiana University, 1965
- Clara Penniman, University of Wisconsin, 1966
- Vernon Van Dyke, University of Iowa, 1967
- John D. Lewis, Oberlin College, 1968
- Samuel J. Eldersveld, University of Michigan, 1969
- Merle Kling, Washington University in St. Louis, 1970
- John Wahlke, University of Iowa, 1971
- Leon D. Epstein, University of Wisconsin, 1972
- Doris A. Graber, University of Illinois, Chicago Circle, 1973
- Frank Sorauf, University of Minnesota, 1974
- Charles Press, Michigan State University, 1975
- Norton Long, University of Missouri–St. Louis, 1976
- Samuel Krislov, University of Minnesota, 1977
- Robert Salisbury, Washington University, 1978
- John Kessel, Ohio State University, 1979
- Malcolm E. Jewell, University of Kentucky, 1980
- Samuel C. Patterson, University of Iowa, 1981
- Dina Zinnes, University of Illinois, 1982
- Jack Dennis, University of Wisconsin, 1983
- Lucius Barker, Washington University in St. Louis, 1984
- Elinor Ostrom, Indiana University, 1985
- W. Phillips Shivley, University of Minnesota, 1986
- Ada W. Finifter, Michigan State University, 1987
- John W. Kingdon, University of Michigan, 1988
- William Crotty, Northwestern University, 1989
- Richard Watson, University of Missouri, 1990
- Marjorie Randon Hershey, Indiana University, 1991
- Charles O. Jones, University of Wisconsin–Madison, 1992
- Susan Welch, Pennsylvania State University, 1993
- Lee Sigelman, George Washington University, 1994
- John Sprague, Washington University in St. Louis, 1995
- James Stimson, University of Minnesota, 1996
- Arlene Saxonhouse, University of Michigan, 1997
- Harold Spaeth, Michigan State University, 1998
- James L. Gibson, Washington University in St. Louis, 1999
- Milton Lodge, Stony Brook University, 2000
- Robert Huckfeldt, Indiana University, 2001
- Herbert Weisberg, The Ohio State University, 2002
- Lee Epstein, Washington University in St. Louis, 2003
- Virginia Gray, University of North Carolina, 2004
- John Aldrich, Duke University, 2005
- Kenneth J. Meier, Texas A&M University, 2006
- Gregory Caldeira, The Ohio State University, 2007
- Rodney Hero, University of Notre Dame, 2008
- Jeffrey A. Segal, Stony Brook University, 2009
- Gary Segura, Stanford University, 2010
- Bryan Jones, University of Texas at Austin, 2011
- Janet M. Box-Steffensmeier, The Ohio State University, 2012
- Nancy Burns, University of Michigan, 2013
- Arthur Lupia, University of Michigan, 2014
- Edward G. Carmines, Indiana University, 2015
- Paula McClain, Duke University, 2015-2016
- Jan E. Leighley, American University, 2016-2017
- Vincent Hutchings, University of Michigan, 2017-2018
- Elisabeth Gerber, University of Michigan, 2018-2019
- Sarah Binder, George Washington University, 2019-2020
- Diana Mutz, University of Pennsylvania, 2020-2021
- Rick Wilson, Rice University, 2021-2022
- Melanie Manion, Duke University, 2022-2023
- Eleanor Neff Powell, University of Wisconsin, Madison, 2023-2024
- Christina Wolbrecht, University of Notre Dame, 2024-2025
- Rikhil Bhavnani, University of Wisconsin-Madison, 2025-2026
- Jennifer Merolla, University of California, Riverside, 2026-2027
