= Martin–Quinn score =

Metric used to gauge ideology of SCOTUS jurists

Martin–Quinn scores or M-Q scores are dynamic metrics used to gauge the ideology of a U.S. Supreme Court Justice based on their voting record. Therefore, a jurist's score will continuously change, unlike static measures of ideology such as the Segal–Cover score and Judicial Common Space score. Martin–Quinn scores are among the most commonly used measures of judicial ideology.

== Background ==
Political scientists have written at length about measuring judicial ideology. The majority of legal scholars have rejected as oversimplified the thesis that judicial decision-making is explained by ideology. In 2010 Ho and Quinn published a paper attempting to "clarify some major misconceptions in the literature". Martin-Quinn scores are one-dimensional. Judicial ideal points estimated in a unidimensional space corresponding to conventional perceptions of a liberal-conservative spectrum are just as likely to represent jurisprudential differences as ideology: "While the measures correspond to conventional perceptions of the left-right spectrum of the Court, such shorthand does not mean that the scale accords with a coherent political policy or pure policy preferences untethered from law."

== History and method ==
The concept of the Martin–Quinn score was published in a 2002 paper by Andrew D. Martin and Kevin M. Quinn. The Martin–Quinn score uses Markov chain Monte Carlo (MCMC) methods to fit a Bayesian model of ideal points. The ideal points can change over time due to the item response model. MQ scores are theoretically unbounded (have no minimum or maximum values). MQ scores are dynamic, as each decision made by a judge creates another data point that can be integrated into the model. The MQ score places the justices on a continuum of more liberal to more conservative. As of 2007, scores roughly ranged between -8 and 4, with the lowest score of about -8 attributed to William O. Douglas (tenure on the USSC from 1939 to 1975) and the highest score of about 4.5 attributed to William Rehnquist (tenure from 1972 to 2005). The largest shift in score between judges on the same Supreme Court seat since 1953 came when Thurgood Marshall (tenure from 1967 to 1990) was replaced by Clarence Thomas.

Ward Farnsworth wrote that while the MQ model has ingenuity and promise, it falls short of proving what it aims to. He criticized the methodology of MQ scores, saying that MQ scores only take into account whether a judge affirms or reverses a ruling, and not the ideological outcome their action supports. In part, "the relationship between the spectrum generated by the [Martin–Quinn] model and the spectrum of policy decisions in the real world is a matter of guesswork. There is no inherent relationship between them.

== Application ==
MQ scores were initially developed to measure and compare the ideological leanings of current and former U.S. Supreme Court justices. They have since been applied to the judicial systems of other countries, including Argentina, Belgium, Brazil, the Philippines, Portugal, Spain, Taiwan, Turkey and the United Kingdom.

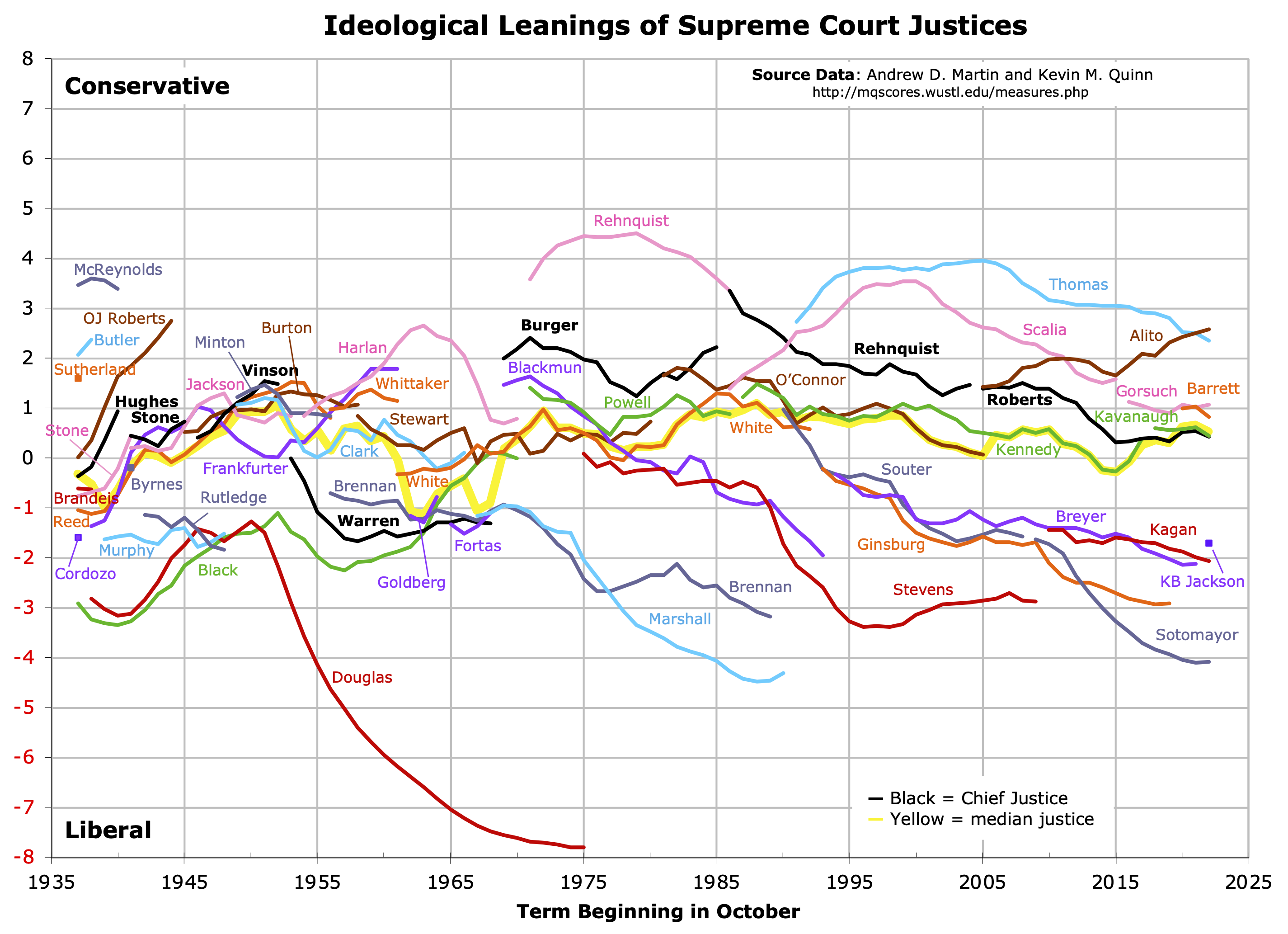
