= Models of judicial decision making =

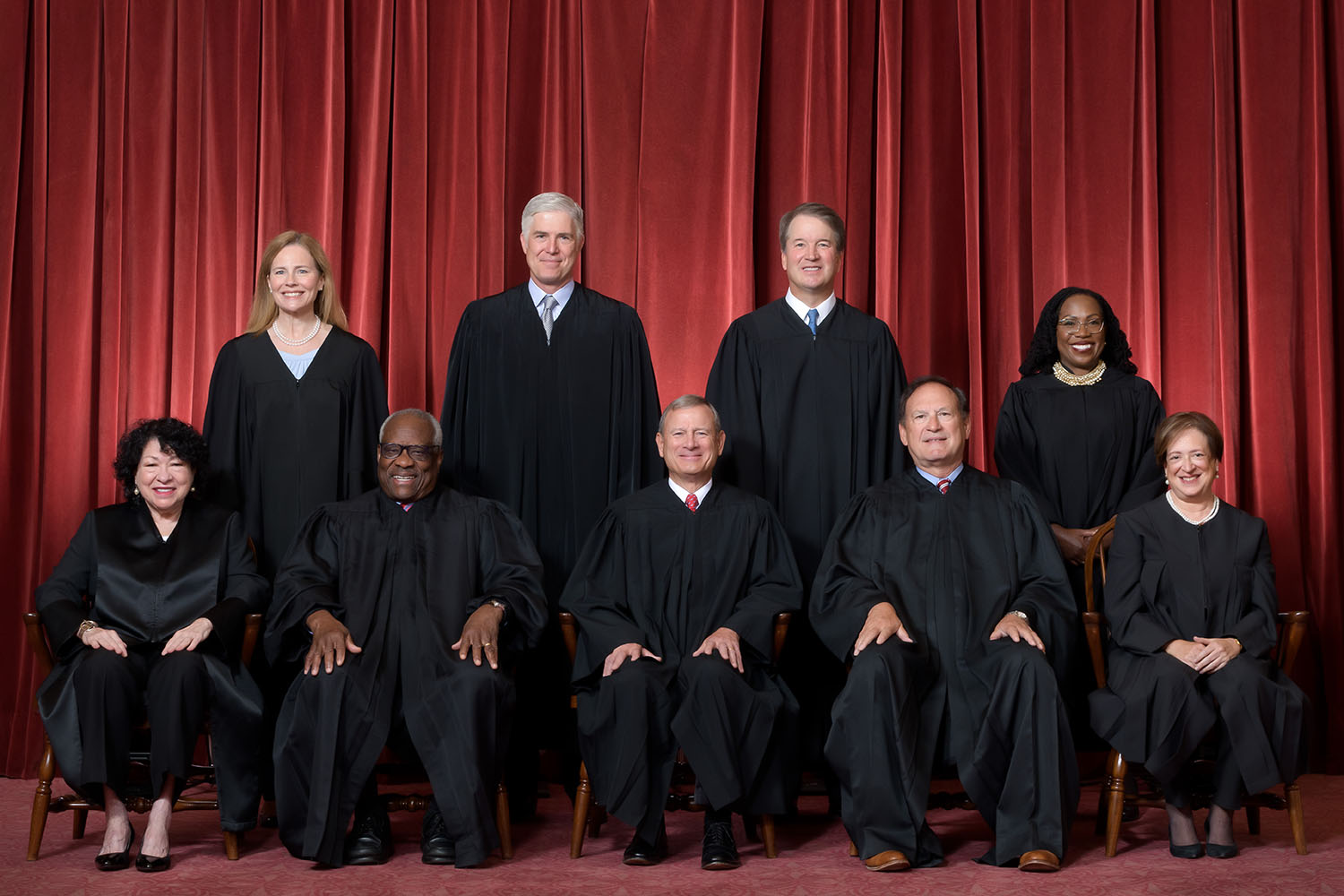
The current membership of the United States Supreme Court.

Models of judicial decision making are developed by researchers and scholars to provide an explanation for the votes of United States Supreme Court Justices.

With the Supreme Court holding such importance in the American legal and political system, researchers, scholars, and court-watchers have long tried to understand the motivations of its justices.

There are three main models of Judicial decision making: the legal model, the attitudinal model, and the strategic model.

== The Legal model ==
By definition, The Legal model is the most traditional way of understanding the actions taken by a justice. The legal model posits that justices decide cases based solely on the facts of the case, the Constitution, and past precedent. The legal model has its roots in static law theory.

=== Criticism of the Legal model ===
Criticism of the Legal Model comes from a variety of observations. Charles Herman Pritchett, writing in 1941, made some early observations that seemed to indicate that the Legal Model was not the sole influence on the votes of Supreme Court justices. He wrote: Working with an identical set of facts, and with roughly comparable training in the law, they come to different conclusions.

Pritchett conducted a rudimentary analysis (though complex at the time) of the dissents rendered by the Court from 1939-1941. He looked closely at which justices tended to join each other in dissent. He found that the justices who joined tended to fall into two distinct groups, and except for two of the justices, none of the justices would join with a justice from the other side in dissent. These two distinct groups aligned with the perceived ideology of the justices at the time. Pritchett took his analysis further and found that for every case in which a dissent was rendered, there was at least one issue of public policy where conservatives and liberals would be expected to differ. There were no dissents rendered in cases involving purely a legal question.

== The Attitudinal model ==
The Attitudinal model posits that the justices vote based solely on their personal policy preferences, attitudes, and values. The attitudinal model has its roots in the legal realist movement.

=== Evidence for the Attitudinal model ===
Proponents of the Attitudinal model include Jeffrey A. Segal and Albert Cover who developed the Segal-Cover score, a measure of the perceived qualifications and ideology of Supreme Court justices. Segal and Cover analyzed the votes of the justices on civil liberties cases, and found that the correlation between their scores and the justices votes was 0.80 with an r² of 0.64. This led to Segal and Cover proposing that it was the justices attitudes and ideology, rather than their views on the law, that was the strongest predictor of their votes, leading to the Attitudinal model.

Proponents of the Attitudinal model typically argue that although there may be other factors at play behind a justices decision, ideology has such a high correlation with votes that it is generally unnecessary to consider them (in civil liberties cases).

== The Strategic model ==
The Strategic model posits that justices are strategic actors who understand that their ability to achieve their policy goal depends on consideration of the preferences of other actors and the institutional context and climate in which they act.

Whilst the Strategic model builds on the central assumption made by the attitudinal model, it recognizes that justices act strategically in order to maximize their policy goals. The justices know that they cannot always act solely on their own interests, and that they must take into account the positions of the other justices, and the other branches of government.

The third factor in the Strategic model is the institutional context that the justices operate in. Meaning the rules, norms, and procedures, of the Supreme Court. One such norm is the creation of and respect for precedent. Another such norm is that the justices have life tenure. If these norms were to change, it would alter the strategic calculations made by the justices.

=== Evidence for the Strategic model ===
Some evidence for the Strategic model has been found by analyzing the number of majority opinion drafts that were circulated before a draft is approved. This research was conducted by Forrest Maltzman, James Spriggs, and Paul Wahlbeck, in their paper: "Marshalling the Court: Bargaining and Accommodation on the United States Supreme Court".

The researchers used Justice Brennan's personal papers which provide detailed information on the votes at the conference stage, the assignments of majority opinions, and the drafting process.

On average, the majority opinion author circulated 2.8 drafts. The authors found that opinion authors are expected to write 20% more drafts when writing on behalf of a minimum winning coalition, than if they are writing on behalf of a unanimous bench. Indicating that the willingness of the opinion author to accommodate is proportional to the size of the majority coalition.

== See also ==
- Decision-making models
- Ideological leanings of United States Supreme Court justices
- Judicial Common Space
- Legal formalism
- Segal–Cover score
- Supreme Court of the United States
