= Carmines =

Carmines is a surname. Notable people with the surname include:

- Al Carmines (1936–2005), American theatre composer
- Edward Carmines (born 1946), American political scientist

== See also ==
- Carmine (disambiguation)
