= Judicial Common Space =

Method of comparing ideologies of US judges

The Judicial Common Space (JCS) is a strategy to compare the ideologies of American judges. It was developed to compare the viewpoints of judges in the US Supreme Court and the Court of Appeals. It is one of the most commonly used measures of judicial ideology.

== History ==
The Judicial Common Space was developed by Lee Epstein, Andrew D. Martin, Jeffrey A. Segal, and Chad Westerland. It developed over a series of conferences and publications from 2005 through 2007, and was based on the NOMINATE Common Space score. NOMINATE was developed in 1997 to compare the political ideologies of members of Congress and Presidents. It also integrated Martin-Quinn scores, developed in 2002 to provide a voting-based ideological comparison of Supreme Court justices. The paper also imports the estimates of ideology for judges on the US Courts of Appeals developed by Micheal Giles, Virginia Hettinger, and Todd Peppers.

== Method ==
The Judicial Common Space is based on the finding that a judge's rulings are often similar in ideology to the person who appointed the judge. The JCS factors in the ideology scores of the president, as well as both senators from the judge's home state. If both senators are in the president's party, their scores are averaged. If both senators are from another party, then neither senator's score is used. The judge is placed on a spectrum of liberal and conservative. A score of "0" indicates no ideological leaning towards either philosophy. A score of −1 is the most liberal ideology, while a score of 1 is the most conservative.

== Accuracy ==
Andrew D. Martin, one of the creators of the JCS as well as the Martin-Quinn score, says that the JCS of circuit court judges is highly correlated to their Martin-Quinn scores after a year on the Supreme Court. This indicates that the JCS is an accurate predictor of ideology.

== See also ==
- Ideological leanings of United States Supreme Court justices
- Segal–Cover score
