= Segal–Cover score =

Index of ideology and qualifications of SCOTUS nominees

A Segal–Cover score is an attempt to measure the "perceived qualifications and ideology" of nominees to the United States Supreme Court. The scores are created by analyzing pre-confirmation newspaper editorials regarding the nominations from The New York Times, Washington Post, Chicago Tribune, Los Angeles Times, St. Louis Post-Dispatch, and The Wall Street Journal. Each nominee receives two scores that range from 0 to 1 based on the average score of all articles from these sources:

- Qualifications: 0 means unqualified and 1 means extremely qualified
  - Qualification scores are based on the characterization of each editorial as positive, neutral, or negative toward the nominee. Positive articles are coded as 1, neutral articles as 0.5, and negative articles as 0.
- Ideology: 0 means most conservative, and 1 means most liberal.
  - Ideology scores are based on each editorial's characterization of the nominee as liberal, moderate, conservative, or not applicable. Articles characterizing the nominee as liberal are coded as 1, moderate as .5, conservative as 0; articles deemed not applicable are omitted from the ideology score.

The Segal–Cover scoring was introduced by Jeffrey Segal and Albert Cover (both of Stony Brook University) in their 1989 article "Ideological Values and the Votes of U.S. Supreme Court Justices". The scores have since been updated as part of The Supreme Court Justices Database, a project led by USC Gould School of Law Professor Lee Epstein. The updated scores cover all nominees from Hugo Black in 1937 to Amy Coney Barrett in 2022. A score for Kentanji Brown Jackson has not yet been published.

Because the scores are based on perceptions before the nominee takes a seat on the Court, they provide a measure of the ideological values of Supreme Court justices that is independent of the votes they later cast.

== Scores ==
The Segal–Cover perceived qualifications and ideology scores for all nominees to the Court between 1937 and 2022:

| Nom. Order | Nominee | Chief Justice | Senate Vote | Ideology Score | Qualifications Score | Nominator (Party) | Year |
|---|---|---|---|---|---|---|---|
| 1 | Hugo Black | | 67 – 18 | 0.875 | 0.160 | Franklin D. Roosevelt (Democrat) | 1937 |
| 2 | Stanley F. Reed | | Voice Vote | 0.725 | 0.875 | Franklin D. Roosevelt (Democrat) | 1938 |
| 3 | Felix Frankfurter | | Voice Vote | 0.665 | 0.965 | Franklin D. Roosevelt (Democrat) | 1939 |
| 4 | William O. Douglas | | 62 – 4 | 0.730 | 0.820 | Franklin D. Roosevelt (Democrat) | 1939 |
| 5 | Frank Murphy | | Voice Vote | 1.000 | 0.650 | Franklin D. Roosevelt (Democrat) | 1940 |
| 6 | Harlan F. Stone | CJ | Voice Vote | 0.300 | 1.000 | Franklin D. Roosevelt (Democrat) | 1941 |
| 7 | James F. Byrnes | | Voice Vote | 0.330 | 0.800 | Franklin D. Roosevelt (Democrat) | 1941 |
| 8 | Robert H. Jackson | | Voice Vote | 1.000 | 0.915 | Franklin D. Roosevelt (Democrat) | 1941 |
| 9 | Wiley B. Rutledge | | Voice Vote | 1.000 | 1.000 | Franklin D. Roosevelt (Democrat) | 1943 |
| 10 | Harold H. Burton | | Voice Vote | 0.280 | 0.930 | Harry S. Truman (Democrat) | 1945 |
| 11 | Fred M. Vinson | CJ | Voice Vote | 0.750 | 0.785 | Harry S. Truman (Democrat) | 1946 |
| 12 | Tom C. Clark | | 73 – 8 | 0.500 | 0.125 | Harry S. Truman (Democrat) | 1949 |
| 13 | Sherman Minton | | 48 – 16 | 0.720 | 0.355 | Harry S. Truman (Democrat) | 1949 |
| 14 | Earl Warren | CJ | Voice Vote | 0.750 | 0.855 | Dwight D. Eisenhower (Republican) | 1953 |
| 15 | John M. Harlan II | | 71 – 11 | 0.875 | 0.750 | Dwight D. Eisenhower (Republican) | 1955 |
| 16 | William J. Brennan, Jr. | | Voice Vote | 1.000 | 1.000 | Dwight D. Eisenhower (Republican) | 1956 |
| 17 | Charles E. Whittaker | | Voice Vote | 0.500 | 1.000 | Dwight D. Eisenhower (Republican) | 1957 |
| 18 | Potter Stewart | | 70 – 17 | 0.750 | 1.000 | Dwight D. Eisenhower (Republican) | 1958 |
| 19 | Byron White | | Voice Vote | 0.500 | 0.500 | John F. Kennedy (Democrat) | 1962 |
| 20 | Arthur J. Goldberg | | Voice Vote | 0.750 | 0.915 | Lyndon B. Johnson (Democrat) | 1965 |
| 21 | Abe Fortas | | Voice Vote | 1.000 | 1.000 | Lyndon B. Johnson (Democrat) | 1965 |
| 22 | Thurgood Marshall | | 69 – 11 | 1.000 | 0.835 | Lyndon B. Johnson (Democrat) | 1967 |
| 23 | Abe Fortas | CJ | 45 – 43 * | 0.845 | 0.635 | Lyndon B. Johnson (Democrat) | 1968 |
| 24 | Warren E. Burger | CJ | 74 – 3 | 0.115 | 0.960 | Richard M. Nixon (Republican) | 1969 |
| 25 | Clement Haynsworth, Jr. | | 45 – 55 | 0.160 | 0.335 | Richard M. Nixon (Republican) | 1969 |
| 26 | G. Harrold Carswell | | 45 – 51 | 0.040 | 0.111 | Richard M. Nixon (Republican) | 1969 |
| 27 | Harry A. Blackmun | | 94 – 0 | 0.115 | 0.970 | Richard M. Nixon (Republican) | 1970 |
| 28 | Lewis F. Powell, Jr. | | 89 – 1 | 0.165 | 1.000 | Richard M. Nixon (Republican) | 1972 |
| 29 | William Rehnquist | | 68 – 26 | 0.045 | 0.885 | Richard M. Nixon (Republican) | 1972 |
| 30 | John Paul Stevens | | 98 – 0 | 0.250 | 0.960 | Gerald Ford (Republican) | 1975 |
| 31 | Sandra Day O'Connor | | 99 – 0 | 0.415 | 1.000 | Ronald Reagan (Republican) | 1981 |
| 32 | William Rehnquist | CJ | 65 – 33 | 0.045 | 0.400 | Ronald Reagan (Republican) | 1986 |
| 33 | Antonin Scalia | | 98 – 0 | 0.000 | 1.000 | Ronald Reagan (Republican) | 1986 |
| 34 | Robert H. Bork | | 42 – 58 | 0.095 | 0.790 | Ronald Reagan (Republican) | 1987 |
| 35 | Douglas Ginsburg | | Withdrawn | 0.000 | 0.320 | Ronald Reagan (Republican) | 1987 |
| 36 | Anthony Kennedy | | 97 – 0 | 0.365 | 0.890 | Ronald Reagan (Republican) | 1988 |
| 37 | David Souter | | 90 – 9 | 0.325 | 0.765 | George H. W. Bush (Republican) | 1990 |
| 38 | Clarence Thomas | | 52 – 48 | 0.160 | 0.415 | George H. W. Bush (Republican) | 1991 |
| 39 | Ruth Bader Ginsburg | | 96 – 3 | 0.680 | 1.000 | Bill Clinton (Democrat) | 1993 |
| 40 | Stephen G. Breyer | | 87 – 9 | 0.475 | 0.545 | Bill Clinton (Democrat) | 1994 |
| 41 | John G. Roberts | CJ | 78 – 22 | 0.120 | 0.970 | George W. Bush (Republican) | 2005 |
| 42 | Harriet E. Miers | | Withdrawn | 0.270 | 0.360 | George W. Bush (Republican) | 2005 |
| 43 | Samuel Alito | | 58 – 42 | 0.100 | 0.810 | George W. Bush (Republican) | 2006 |
| 44 | Sonia Sotomayor | | 68 – 31 | 0.780 | 0.810 | Barack Obama (Democrat) | 2009 |
| 45 | Elena Kagan | | 63 – 37 | 0.730 | 0.730 | Barack Obama (Democrat) | 2010 |
| 46 | Merrick Garland | | Lapsed | 0.730 | 1.000 | Barack Obama (Democrat) | 2016 |
| 47 | Neil Gorsuch | | 54 – 45 | 0.110 | 0.930 | Donald Trump (Republican) | 2017 |
| 48 | Brett Kavanaugh | | 50 – 48 | 0.070 | 0.400 | Donald Trump (Republican) | 2018 |
| 49 | Amy Coney Barrett | | 52 – 48 | 0.230 | 0.820 | Donald Trump (Republican) | 2020 |
| 50 | Ketanji Brown Jackson | | 53– 47 | ? | ? | Joe Biden (Democrat) | 2022 |

* The vote on Fortas for the Chief Justice position was on cloture and failed to receive the necessary two-thirds majority.

- A highlighted row indicates that the Justice is currently serving on the Court.
- A Senate vote in red text indicates that the nomination was blocked.
- A question mark indicates that no Segal-Cover score is available for this Justice.

== Predictive power ==
Segal and Cover found that their ideology score is strongly correlated with the subsequent votes of the justices in civil liberties cases, with a correlation of 0.80 and an r² of 0.64.

Segal-Cover scores require subjective assessment of subjective sources. They are not based on any observed voting behavior of judges.

In a 1995 paper revisiting the Segal-Cover score, Segal and his coauthors concluded that the ideology score was significantly more accurate for justices who served during and after the Warren Court . For earlier Court eras Segal et al. (1995) conclude that "scholars should be sensitive to changes in the legal, political, and social environments (which generate the newspaper reactions on which the scores are based) and use appropriate diagnostic tools to tease out their potential effects." They caution that researchers analyzing the ideology of earlier justices should supplement the ideology scores of earlier judges with "other potential determinants of the vote, or redefine their ideological variables to reflect as precisely as possible the issues that their Court addressed."

== See also ==
- Models of judicial decision making
- Ideological leanings of United States Supreme Court justices
- Judicial Common Space
- Supreme Court of the United States
