= Pamela Conover =

American political scientist

- Education: Emory University; University of Minnesota
- Awards: Gregory M. Luebbert Award, APSA; Robert Bailey Award, APSA
- Scientific career
- Fields: Political science
- Workplaces: University of Kentucky; University of North Carolina, Chapel Hill

Pamela Johnston Conover is an American political scientist. In 2007 she was named the Burton Craige Distinguished Professor of Political Science at the University of North Carolina, Chapel Hill. She studies political behavior and political psychology, with particular focuses on women and politics as well as political media studies.

== Education and early career ==
Conover graduated from Emory University with a BA degree in 1973. She then received her PhD from the University of Minnesota in 1979, with a major in political science and a minor in psychology. Her dissertation was titled The Nature and Sources of Candidate Images: A Social Psychological Approach. After graduating from the University of Minnesota, Conover joined the faculty at the University of Kentucky, and in 1984 she moved to the University of North Carolina, Chapel Hill.

== Career ==
In addition to numerous articles in journals like American Journal of Political Science, the British Journal of Political Science, and The Journal of Politics, Conover has coauthored two books. Together with Virginia Gray, Conover wrote the 2003 book Feminism and the New Right: Conflict Over the American Family. The book investigated how the American New Right formed in opposition to the American feminist movement. She was also a coauthor of the 1990 publication Conceptions of Citizenship among Britain and American Publics: An Exploratory Analysis with Ivor Crewe and Donald D. Searing.

In 2019, a citation analysis by the political scientists Hannah June Kim and Bernard Grofman identified Conover as one of the top 40 most cited women working as a political scientist at an American university. In the same article Conover was also listed among the top 25 most cited political scientists working in the fields of Public Policy, Public Administration, Public Law, or Political Psychology.

Conover and the political scientist Patrick Miller received extensive news coverage for their study "Red and Blue States of Mind: Partisan Hostility and Voting in the United States", published in Political Research Quarterly in 2015. ScienceDaily summarised the study as finding that "Most partisans -- average Democratic and Republican voters -- act like fans in sports rivalries instead of making political choices based on issues".

In 2007, Conover was made a Burton Craige Distinguished Professor of Political Science at the University of North Carolina at Chapel Hill. She is one of six Burton Craige Distinguished Professors in Jurisprudence there. Conover's work has also received several awards from the American Political Science Association. She was the 2003 winner of the Gregory M. Luebbert Best Article Award, which "is given for the best article in the field of comparative politics published in the previous two years", for her 2001 article "The Deliberative Potential of Political Discussion" in the British Journal of Political Science. In 2004, she received the Robert Bailey Award for the best paper on LGBT politics at the 2003 American Political Science Association annual conference.

== Selected works ==
- "The Origins and Meaning of Liberal/Conservative Self-Identifications", American Journal of Political Science, with Stanley Feldman (1981)
- Feminism and the New Right: Conflict Over the American Family, with Virginia Gray (2003)
- "Red and Blue States of Mind: Partisan Hostility and Voting in the United States", Political Research Quarterly, with Patrick Miller (2015)

== Selected awards ==
- Gregory M. Luebbert Best Article Award, American Political Science Association (2003)
- Robert Bailey Award, American Political Science Association (2004)
