= Caldeira =

Caldeira is a Portuguese surname. Notable people with the surname include:

- Alice Dayrell Caldeira Brant (1880–1970), Brazilian juvenile writer
- Amir Caldeira (born 1950), Brazilian physicist
- Bernard Anício Caldeira Duarte (born 1992), Brazilian footballer
- Darren Caldeira (born 1987), Indian footballer
- Gregory A. Caldeira, American political scientist
- Kenneth Caldeira (born 1960), American atmospheric scientist
- Manuel Caldeira (1926–2014), Portuguese footballer

== See also ==
- Caldera (disambiguation)
