= Dina Zinnes =

American political scientist

- Education: University of Michigan; Stanford University
- Scientific career
- Fields: Political science
- Workplaces: Indiana University; University of Illinois

Dina A. Zinnes is an American political scientist. She is Professor Emerita in the Department of Political Science at the University of Illinois. Zinnes studies international relations, and was a pioneer in the use of mathematical models in political science research.

== Career and research ==
Zinnes attended the University of Michigan and Stanford University, where she completed her PhD in 1963. Her thesis was entitled Expression and perception of hostility in inter-state relations. She joined the faculty of Indiana University, where she co-founded the Center for International Policy Studies. She then became a professor at the University of Illinois. There, she founded and directed the Merriam Laboratory for Analytic Political Research. She is a Professor Emerita in the University of Illinois Department of Political Science.

In 1976, Zinnes published the book Contemporary Research in International Relations: A Perspective and a Critical Appraisal. In Contemporary Research in International Relations, Zinnes advocated for a new emphasis on theory development and refinement in international relations research, in contrast to the ad-hoc style of hypothesis testing that she argued characterized the field at the time.

Zinnes has also edited or co-edited several of books, many of which relate to the use of mathematical modeling and quantitative analysis in international relations research. These include co-editing the 1976 book Quantitative International Politics: An Appraisal with Francis W. Hoole and co-editing Mathematical Systems in International Relations Research with John V. Gillespie in 1977. Other books that she co-edited on international relations topics include Cumulation in International Relations Research (1981) and Conflict Processes and the Breakdown of International Systems (1983).

Zinnes was president of the International Studies Association in the 1980–1981 term. She was the first woman to hold this position, and is the namesake of an annual award which is given by the Scientific Study of International Processes Section of the International Studies Association, for the best paper presented by a graduate student at the Association's annual conference. She was also the president of the Midwest Political Science Association in 1982, and of the Peace Science Society in 1989. Zinnes has been the editor of a number of journals, including the American Political Science Review from 1981 to 1985.

== Selected works ==
- "A comparison of hostile behavior of decision-makers in simulate and historical data", World Politics (1966)
- "An analytical study of the balance of power theories", Journal of Peace Research (1967)
- Contemporary Research in International Relations: A Perspective and a Critical Appraisal (1976)
- "Three puzzles in search of a researcher: Presidential address", International Studies Quarterly (1980)
- Cumulation in International Relations Research (with P. Terrence Hopmann and J. David Singer), editor (1981)
- Conflict Processes and the Breakdown of International Systems, editor (1983)
