= Lee Sigelman =

Political political scientist (1945–2009)

- Born: Lee Philip Sigelman. March 28, 1945; Watertown, South Dakota, US
- Died: December 21, 2009 (aged 64); Washington, D.C., US
- Education: Carleton College (B.A., 1967); Vanderbilt University (Ph.D., 1973)
- Spouse: Carol Kimball Sigelman (m. 1969–2009)
- Awards: 2007 Frank J. Goodnow Distinguished Service Award from the American Political Science Association
- Scientific career
- Fields: Political science
- Workplaces: Texas Tech University; University of Kentucky; University of Arizona; George Washington University
- Thesis: Modernization and Administration: A Cross-sectional Analysis (1973)

Lee Philip Sigelman (March 28, 1945 – December 21, 2009) was an American political scientist. At the time of his death in 2009, he was the Columbian College Distinguished Professor of Political Science at George Washington University. He served as editor-in-chief of the American Political Science Review from 2001 to 2007, as editor-in-chief of American Politics Quarterly from 1981 to 1987, and as president of the Midwest Political Science Association in 1994.

== Recognition ==
Sigelman received two of George Washington University's highest awards: one for scholarship in 1999, and one for service in 2008. He also received the Frank J. Goodnow Distinguished Service Award from the American Political Science Association in 2007 and the National Capital Area Political Science Association Walter Beach Pi Sigma Alpha Award in 2008. After Seligman's death, his alma mater, Carleton College, established the annual Lee Sigelman Prize in Political Science in his memory. The prize is awarded annually to the best paper written for a political science class at Carleton by a student who has declared political science as their major, and who has not yet finished their junior year. The first prize was awarded in 2011.
