= John Wahlke =

American political scientist (1917–2008)

John Charles Wahlke (October 29, 1917 – April 10, 2008) was an American political scientist.

Wahlke was born on October 29, 1917, and raised in Cincinnati, Ohio. After graduating from high school in 1935, Wahlke worked for Seagram and Sons and the Crosley Corporation. He attended the University of Cincinnati and Harvard College, and was inducted into Phi Beta Kappa, then served in the United States Army before continuing graduate study at Harvard University, where he completed a doctoral dissertation in 1952.

Wahlke developed several educational programs for the American Political Science Association. He taught at Amherst College for four years, and subsequently joined the faculty of Vanderbilt University. While at Vanderbilt, Wahlke led the Vanderbilt-in-France program from 1961 to 1962. Following Vanderbilt, Wahlke taught at the State University of New York at Buffalo and the University of Iowa, where he led the Midwest Political Science Association in 1971. Wahlke joined the Stony Brook University faculty in 1972, and served as president of the American Political Science Association between 1977 and 1978. He ended his career at the University of Arizona. Wahlke died at the age of 90 in Tucson, Arizona, on April 10, 2008.
