= Charles Herman Pritchett =

American political scientist

Charles H. Pritchett
- Born: Charles Herman Pritchett; 9 February 1907; Latham, Illinois
- Died: 28 April 1995 (aged 88); Santa Barbara, California
- Education: Millikin University; University of Chicago
- Awards: Professor Emeritus (University of Chicago)
- Scientific career
- Fields: Political science
- Institutions: University of Chicago; University of California Santa Cruz

Charles Herman Pritchett (February 9, 1907 - April 28, 1995) was an American political scientist who served as a Professor Emeritus in Political Science at the University of Chicago. He later moved to the University of California Santa Barbara, where he taught until 1974.

Pritchett was president of the American Political Science Association from 1963 to 1964, and he was a fellow of the American Academy of Arts and Sciences.

He was regarded as an expert on American constitutional law and a pioneer in the behavioral approach in political science, especially in the analysis of decisions of the Supreme Court of the United States. Pritchett pioneered the modern study of judicial behavior.

== Life ==
Pritchett obtained a bachelor's degree from Millikin University in 1927 and a Ph.D. from the University of Chicago in 1937. He then worked for the Tennessee Valley Authority, the Social Science Research Council and the U.S. Department of Labor before becoming a member of the faculty at the University of Chicago.

From 1948 to 1955 and from 1958 to 1964 he was chairman of the local department of political science. Visiting professorships took him to Makerere University (Uganda) in 1963 and to Stanford University in 1966. He retired emeritus in 1966, but moved to the University of California Santa Barbara, in 1970, where he taught until 1974.

In 1963/64, Pritchett was president of the American Political Science Association. In 1988 he was elected to the American Academy of Arts and Sciences.

C. Herman Pritchett was married to Marguerite Lentler Pritchett (1906–1998).

== The Roosevelt Court: A Study in Judicial Politics and Values, 1937-1947 ==
Pritchett wondered why justices working with an identical set of facts, and with roughly comparable training in the law, come to different conclusions. His research indicated that justices seemed to vote along ideological lines, providing early evidence for the attitudinal model.

== Books ==
- The Roosevelt Court: A Study in Judicial Politics and Values, 1937-1947 (1948)
- The American Constitution (1959)
- Congress versus the Supreme Court (1961)
- The American Constitutional System (1963)

== See also ==
Models of judicial decision making
