= Jan Leighley =

American political scientist

- Education: University of Akron; Washington University in St. Louis
- Awards: Frank J. Goodnow Award, APSA
- Scientific career
- Fields: Political science
- Workplaces: Texas A&M University; Rice University; University of Arizona; American University

Jan E. Leighley is an American political scientist. She is a professor of government at American University. She studies the causes of voter turnout in American politics, including election laws, and how those causes can vary among the population.

== Early work and education ==
Leighley attended the University of Akron, graduating with a BA in political science in 1982 and an MA in political science in 1984. She then continued her graduate education at Washington University in St. Louis, where she received a PhD in political science in 1988.

In 1988, Leighley joined the political science faculty at Texas A&M University, remaining there until 2004. She then became a professor at the University of Arizona, and in 2010 moved to American University. She has also been a visiting professor at Rice University.

== Career ==
=== Publications ===
In addition to numerous peer-reviewed journal articles in journals like the American Political Science Review, the American Journal of Political Science, and the Journal of Politics, Leighley has been the sole author of two books, as well as a co-author of one and the editor of another. Her first book, Strength in Numbers? The Political Mobilization of Racial and Ethnic Minorities, was published in 2001. The book sought to explain variations in electoral participation among ethnic groups in the United States by building on a rational choice framework of voter engagement, which Fredrick C. Harris called "an important step toward unraveling how participation and mobilization differ among African-Americans, Latinos, and Anglos". Using several datasets to test her rational choice models, she checks for the impact of elite mobilization, relational goods, and racial and ethnic context on the participation of members of different groups. Dianne Pinderhughes wrote that of particular interest was Leighley's finding that mobilization is more effective within racial and ethnic groups when the individuals being mobilized live in more homogeneous environments.

In 2004, Leighley published the textbook Mass Media and Politics: A Social Science Perspective, and in 2010 she edited The Oxford Handbook of American Elections and Political Behavior. Leighley also co-authored the 2014 book Who Votes Now? Demographics, Issues, Inequality and Turnout in the United States with Jonathan Nagler. In Who Votes Now?, Leighley and Nagler study voter turnout in US presidential elections between 1972 and 2008, illustrating how election laws shape the realities of voter turnout, and finding that voters who turn out are systematically more conservative and of different social classes than voters who do not.

In addition to her peer-reviewed academic work, Leighley has written pieces or been cited on topics like US voter turnout in media outlets such as The New York Times, The Washington Post, The Atlantic, and NPR.

=== Service and recognition ===
Leighley has been the editor of two of the most selective political science journals: she served as editor for the American Journal of Political Science from 2002 until 2005, and for the Journal of Politics from 2009 until 2014, and also as interim lead editor of the Journal of Politics from 2018 to 2019. The American Political Science Association, which publishes both of those journals, has noted that it is rare and noteworthy to be selected multiple times to edit a major journal, and implies "a job done exceptionally well". Leighley has also been the program director for the Division of Social and Economic Sciences at the National Science Foundation, overseeing the programs for Accountable Institutions and Behavior and Political Science. She was elected president of the Midwest Political Science Association in 2016, serving a one-year term.

In 2019, Leighley received the Frank J. Goodnow Award from the American Political Science Association, which is awarded to recognize "outstanding service to the political science community and to the Association".

== Selected works ==
- Strength in Numbers? The Political Mobilization of Racial and Ethnic Minorities (2001)
- Mass Media and Politics: A Social Science Perspective (2004)
- Who Votes Now? Demographics, Issues, Inequality and Turnout in the United States, with Jonathan Nagler (2014)

== Selected awards ==
- Frank J. Goodnow Award, American Political Science Association
