= Gregory A. Caldeira =

American political scientist

- Education: Princeton University (PhD), California State University, Stanislaus (BA)
- Scientific career
- Fields: Political science
- Institutions: Ohio State University

Gregory A. Caldeira is an American political scientist and educator. He is a distinguished university professor, the Ann and Darrell Dreher Chair in Political Communication and Policy Thinking, and Professor of Law at Ohio State University in Columbus, Ohio.

He received a PhD in 1978 from Princeton University. From 1967 to 1978, Caldeira was professor of political science at the University of Iowa in Iowa City. Caldiera was an editor of the American Journal of Political Science from 1998 until 2001.

== Books ==
- Citizens, Courts, and Confirmations: Positivity Theory and Americans Judgments of the Supreme Court (with James L. Gibson, Princeton University Press, 2009)
- Oxford Handbook of Law and Politics (edited, with Whittington and Keleman; NewYork: Oxford University Press, 2008)
