= La Follette School of Public Affairs =

Public policy school of the University of Wisconsin–Madison

Coordinates: 43°04′34.4″N 89°24′27.5″W

- Type: Public
- Established: 1967 (1999)
- Director: Susan Webb Yackee
- Faculty: 22
- Students: 110
- Location: Madison, Wisconsin, United States
- Campus: University of Wisconsin–Madison
- Website: www.lafollette.wisc.edu
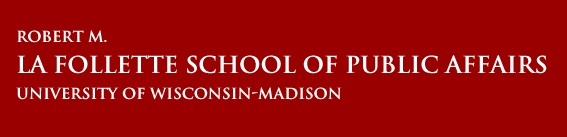

The La Follette School of Public Affairs is a public public policy school at the University of Wisconsin–Madison. It offers master's degrees in public affairs and international public affairs, joint graduate degrees with other departments, and an undergraduate major in public policy, as well as certificates in public policy and health policy. The La Follette School is housed in the Observatory Hill Office Building and Sterling Hall.

== History ==
The school was founded in 1967 as the Center for the Study of Public Policy and Administration by Clara Penniman, the first woman to chair the university's political science department, making it one of the longest established institutions by type for the specific study of public policy. In 1983 it was separated from the department by an act of the Wisconsin Legislature, which established an Institute of Public Affairs named for Wisconsin governor and U.S. senator Robert M. La Follette Sr. The Institute was upgraded to a School in 1999, and offers a relatively small class size from a competitive international admissions process.

== Program of study ==
Two graduate degrees are offered by the La Follette School:

- Master of Public Affairs (MPA)
- Master of International Public Affairs (MIPA)

The MPA is based around a core curriculum of policy analysis and development, public management, microeconomics, and statistics. The MIPA has a greater focus on macroeconomics and international trade. Both are designed as two-year professional programs, with a capstone research project for real-world clients during the final semester. Students select one or more focus fields, such as public finance, health policy, public management, social and poverty policy, or international development.

Students may enroll in joint degree programs with other university departments:

- Law and Public Policy, with the Law School (JD and MPA)
- Urban Planning and Public Affairs, with the Department of Planning and Landscape Architecture (MS in urban and regional planning and MPA)
- Public Health and Public Policy, with the School of Medicine and Public Health (Master of Public Health and MPA)
- Energy Analysis and Public Policy, with the Nelson Institute for Environmental Studies (MPA with a certificate in energy analysis and policy
- Neuroscience and Public Policy, with the Neuroscience Training Program (Ph.D. in neuroscience and MPA)

An accelerated program allows undergraduate students at the University of Wisconsin-Madison to complete their first year of graduate study during their senior year.

== Undergraduate Major and Certificates ==
The undergraduate major in public policy is a degree program in the College of Letters and Sciences.

The undergraduate certificate in public policy allows undergraduate students at the University of Wisconsin-Madison to apply a policy perspective to their major course of study.

== Recognition ==
The La Follette School of Public Affairs ranked 3^{rd} in the nation among public schools in health policy and management and tied for 4^{th} place among public schools in social policy in the 2026 Best Graduate Schools rankings from the U.S. News & World Report.
