= Ideological leanings of United States Supreme Court justices =

The Supreme Court of the United States is the country's highest federal court. The Court has ultimate—and largely discretionary—appellate jurisdiction over all federal courts and state court cases involving issues of U.S. federal law, plus original jurisdiction over a small range of cases.

The nine Supreme Court justices base their decisions on their interpretation of both legal doctrine and the precedential application of laws in the past. In most cases, interpreting the law is relatively clear-cut and the justices decide unanimously; however, in more complicated or controversial cases, the Court is often divided.

In modern discourse, the justices of the Court are often categorized as having conservative, moderate, or liberal philosophies of law and of judicial interpretation. It has long been commonly assumed that justices' votes are a reflection of their judicial decision-making philosophy as well as their ideological leanings, personal attitudes, values, political philosophies, or policy preferences. A growing body of academic research has confirmed this understanding, as scholars have found that the justices largely vote in consonance with their perceived values. Analysts have used a variety of methods to deduce the specific perspective of each justice.

== Partisan balance ==
The simplest way to approximate the ideological leanings of Supreme Court justices is by the political party of the president who appointed them. In a 2000 paper, Segal, Timpone, and Howard found that, in their study area (civil liberties and economics cases from 1937 to 1994), presidents appear to be reasonably successful in extending their policy preferences by appointing like-minded justices to the court, though they found that justices appear to deviate over time away from the presidents who appointed them. In 1999, Pinello conducted a meta-analysis of 84 studies of American courts covering 222,789 cases adjudicated since World War II and found that political party affiliation was a dependable indicator of rulings: Judges appointed by Democratic presidents voted in favor of liberal solutions more often than judges appointed by Republican presidents did, especially in federal courts (the U.S. Supreme Court, U.S. Courts of Appeal, and U.S. District Courts).

The graph below, based on data from the Supreme Court Database, shows this partisan split. In all the non-unanimous decisions made by the Supreme Court in the terms from 1937 to 2025 in which there was a specifiable ideological direction, justices appointed by Republican presidents (red bars) generally cast liberal votes much less frequently than did justices appointed by Democratic presidents (blue bars). At the top of this graph, the 7 justices, including two chief justices (marked "CJ") and 2 current justices (with solid red bars), who cast the lowest percentage of liberal votes were all appointed by Republican presidents. At the bottom of the graph, the 3 justices, including 1 current justice (with a solid blue bar), who cast the highest percentage of liberal votes were appointed by Democratic presidents. The current justices (those voting together since the 2023 term, shown with solid bars) are near the extremes for this period with all the 6 Republican-appointed justices near the top and the 3 Democratic-appointed justices near the bottom.

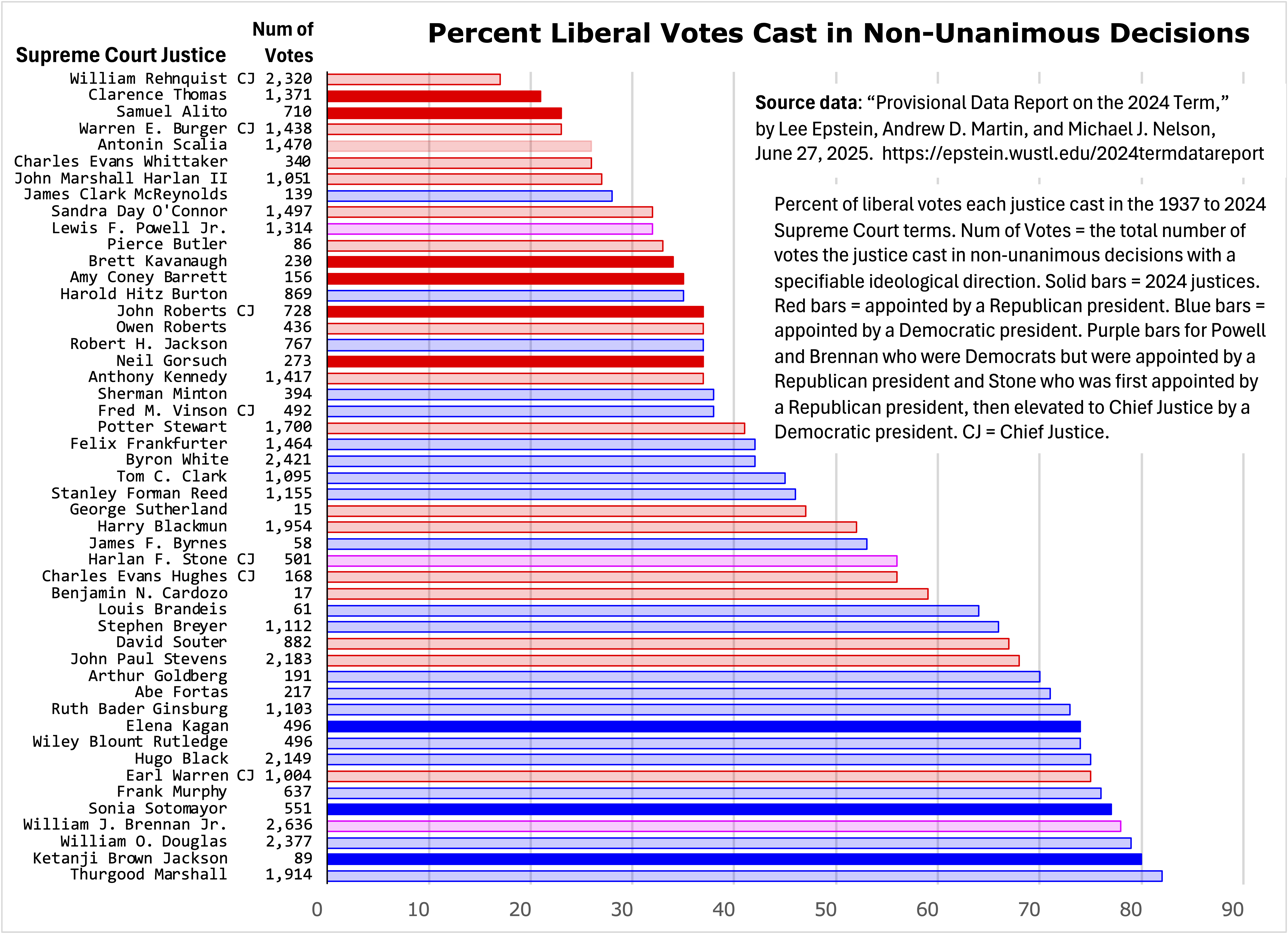

The graph below (using data from List of justices of the Supreme Court of the United States) shows the number of justices sitting in the Supreme Court who were appointed by Democratic or Republican presidents since 1936. In 1936, the Court had 7 justices appointed by Republican presidents and 2 appointed by Democratic presidents. Democratic president Franklin D. Roosevelt then filled the Supreme Court with 8 appointees in the late 1930s and 40s and promoted Chief Justice Harlan F. Stone, who had originally been appointed to the Court by Republican president Calvin Coolidge. Then Democratic president Harry S. Truman appointed 4 justices. In the 1950s, Republican president Dwight D. Eisenhower appointed 5 justices, reversing the partisan balance.

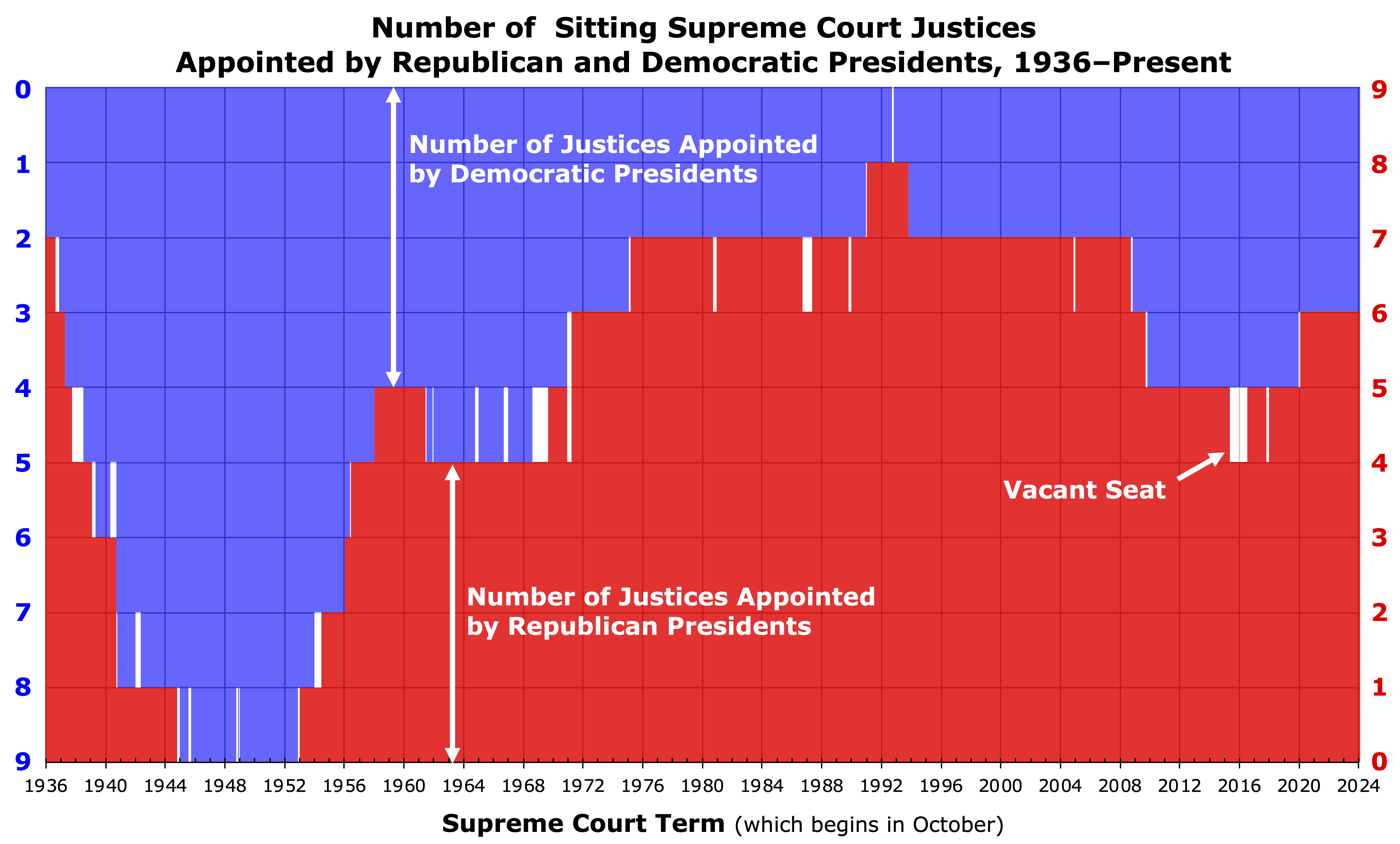

In the 1960s, Democratic presidents John F. Kennedy and Lyndon B. Johnson, appointed 2 justices each, flipping the balance back to a majority of Democratic-appointed justices. This was reversed by Republican president Richard Nixon who appointed 4 justices, followed by Republican presidents Gerald Ford, Ronald Reagan, and George H. W. Bush appointing a total of 7 more justices. (Democratic president Jimmy Carter was not able to appoint any justices in his single term). In succession, Democratic president Bill Clinton, Republican president George W. Bush, and then Democratic president Barack Obama each appointed 2 justices. Since 2020, with the appointment of 3 justices by Republican president Donald Trump, the Court has 6 justices appointed by Republican presidents. Democratic president Joe Biden appointed 1 justice, but that appointment did not change the partisan balance. As the graph clearly shows, in every term since 1970, the Court majority (consisting of at least 5 of the justices) has been appointed by Republican presidents. Every chief justice since 1953 has also been appointed by Republican presidents.

Devins and Baum point out that "before 2010, the Court never had clear ideological blocs that coincided with party lines". In choosing their appointments, presidents often focused more on friendship and political connections than on ideology. Republican presidents sometimes appointed liberals and Democratic presidents sometimes appointed conservatives. As a result, "... between 1790 and early 2010 there were only two decisions that the Guide to the U.S. Supreme Court designated as important and that had at least two dissenting votes in which the Justices divided along party lines, about one-half of one percent." Even in the turbulent 1960s and 1970s, Democratic and Republican elites tended to agree on some major issues, especially concerning civil rights and civil liberties—and so did the justices. But since 1991, ideology has been much more important in choosing justices—all Republican appointees have been committed conservatives and all Democratic appointees have been liberals. As the more moderate Republican justices retired, the court has become more partisan. The Court is now divided sharply along partisan lines with justices appointed by Republican presidents taking increasingly conservative positions and those appointed by Democrats taking moderate liberal positions. This alignment between the Justices' partisanship and their ideological leanings (known as "partisan sorting") appears to be greater than ever before.

A recent academic study indicates an earlier partisan split in one area: since 1920 justices appointed by Republican Presidents generally have made more pro-business decisions than those appointed by Democratic Presidents, and this pro-business propensity has grown since the 1950s and especially in the Roberts Court. Another study shows that, since the Warren Court in the 1950s, Republican-appointed justices have increasingly favored wealthy people and their interests.

== Measuring ideological leanings ==
To further discern the justices' ideological leanings, researchers have carefully analyzed the judicial rulings of the Supreme Court—the votes and written opinions of the justices—as well as their upbringing, their political party affiliation, their speeches, their political contributions before appointment, editorials written about them at the time of their Senate confirmation, the political climate in which they are appointed, confirmed, and work, and the political contributions of the law clerks they hire. Bonica and Sen provide an extensive overview of these methods.

From this data, scholars have inferred the ideological leanings of each justice and how the justices are likely to vote on upcoming cases. For example, Segal and Cover found a strong correlation (r=0.80) between justices' perceived ideological perspectives on civil liberties and civil rights issues as attributed to them in elite newspaper editorials written just before their confirmation (their Segal–Cover score) and their later votes in the study period 1953–1988. Epstein, Walker, and Dixon found they could explain and predict rulings in criminal justice cases (in the study period 1946–1986) using a simple model with four inputs: the political party affiliation of the majority of justices, the political party affiliation of the current president (representing the current political climate), the Supreme Court rulings in criminal justice cases in the previous year, and the percent of criminal cases the Court decides to hear in the current year (how much interest they take in the issue). In this analysis, the political party affiliation of the majority of justices provided about one-fourth of the predictive power. Bonica et al. utilized the ideology of the law clerks hired by federal judges (as estimated by the law clerks' political donations) to estimate the ideology of the judges themselves.

Using statistical analysis of Supreme Court votes, scholars found that an inferred value representing a justice's ideological preference on a simple conservative–liberal scale is sufficient to predict a large number of that justice's votes. For example, Grofman and Brazill performed multidimensional scaling (MDS) using SYSTAT 5.0 of the entire range of cases considered by the Supreme Court, 1953–1991. Analyzing terms with an unchanging membership ("natural courts") and a complete bench of nine members (3,363 cases), they found that a one-dimensional scale provided a satisfactory explanation of votes and that the degree of unidimensionality generally rose over the years, writing: "On average, over the 15 courts, the mean r^{2} values are 0.86 for a one dimensional metric MDS solution, and 0.97 for a two dimensional metric MDS solution." In 2003, Poole used various statistical measures to show that a unidimensional scale provided a good measure of the Rehnquist Court during the 8-year period 1995–2002.

== Ideological leanings over time ==
Using increasingly sophisticated statistical analysis, researchers have found that the policy preferences of many justices shift over time. The ideological leanings of justices and the drift over time can be seen clearly in the research results of two sets of scholars using somewhat different models:

Andrew D. Martin and Kevin M. Quinn have employed Markov chain Monte Carlo methods to fit a Bayesian statistic measurement model of ideal points (policy preferences on a one-dimensional scale) for all the justices based on the votes in every contested Supreme Court case since 1937. The graph below shows the results of their analysis: the ideological leaning of each justice from the term that began in October 1937 to the term that began in October 2022. Note that the scale and zero point are strongly dependent on the particular set of cases chosen to be reviewed by the Court each year; the relative distance between the lines for each justice is most informative. Each unique color represents a particular Supreme Court seat. The black lines represent the leanings of the chief justices. The yellow line represents the estimated location of the median justice—who, as Duncan Black's median voter theorem posits, is often the swing vote in closely divided decisions.

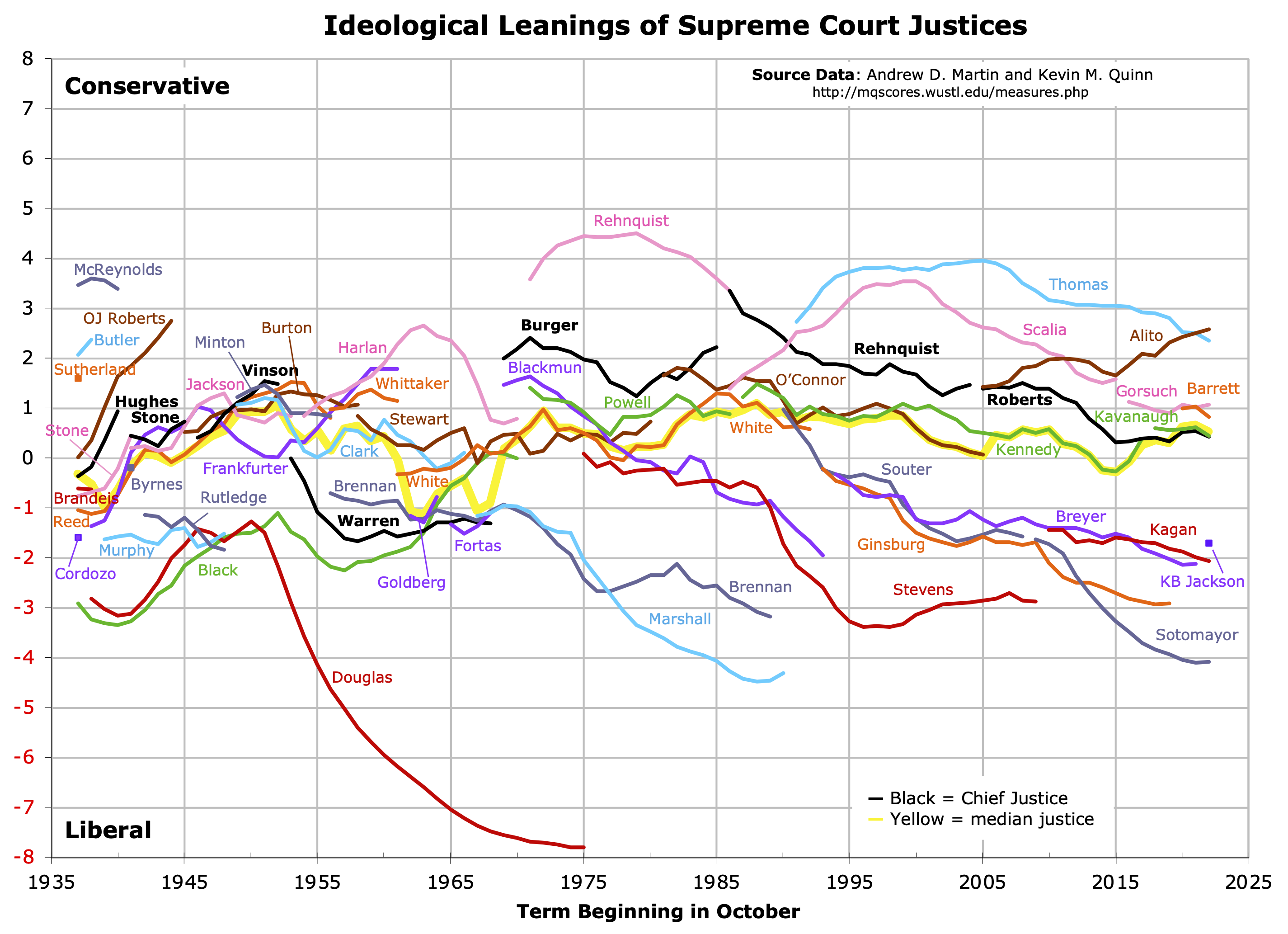

Michael A. Bailey used a slightly different Markov chain Monte Carlo Bayesian method to determine ideological leanings and made significantly different scaling assumptions. He analyzed cases by calendar year (rather than Supreme Court term) and supplemented the data regarding votes in each Court case with additional information from the majority, concurring, and dissenting opinions in which justices commented on previous cases, as well as with votes made by members of Congress on similar legislation, amicus filings by U.S. solicitors general and members of Congress, and presidential and Congressional positions on Court cases. This additional information gave him a richer dataset and also enabled him to deduce preference values that are more consistent with the DW-Nominate Common Space scores used to evaluate the ideological leanings of members of Congress and presidents. However, he only used votes and cases related to the major topics addressed by the courts in the postwar era: crime, civil rights, free speech, religion, abortion, privacy, and labor unions. He did not include cases addressing federalism, judicial power, economic activity, or federal taxation.

The graph below shows the ideological leaning of each justice by calendar year from 1950 to 2019. The scale and zero point roughly correspond to DW-Nominate Common Space scores. As in the graph above, each unique color represents a particular Supreme Court seat. The black lines represent the leanings of the chief justices, and the yellow line represents the median justice.

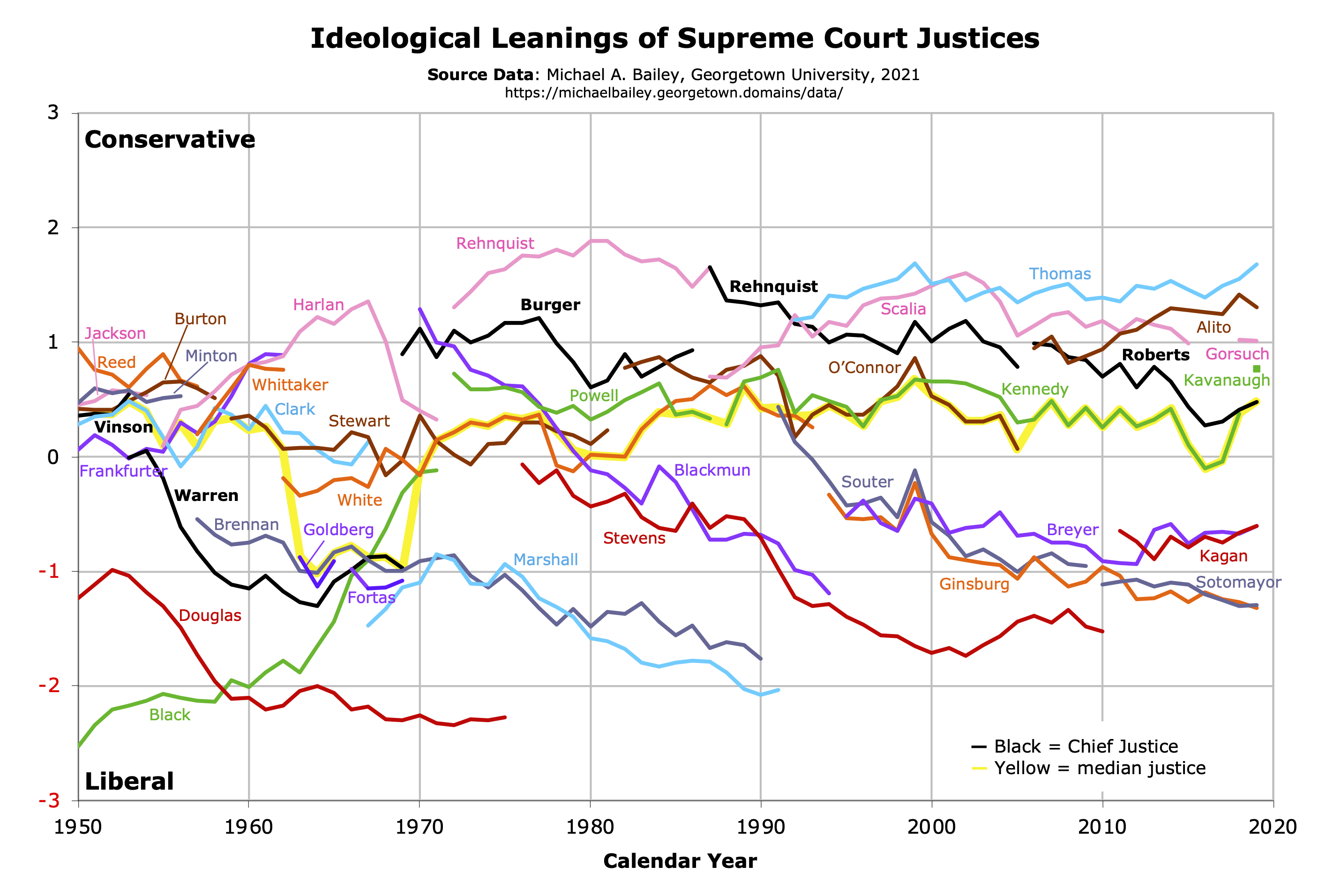

These two graphs differ because of the choices of data sources, data coverage, coding of complicated cases, smoothing parameters, and statistical methods. Each of the lines in these graphs also has a wide band of uncertainty. Because these analyses are based on statistics and probability, it is important not to over-interpret the results. Also note that the nature of the cases the Supreme Court chooses to hear and which questions they choose to address may lead the justices to appear more liberal or conservative than they would if they were hearing a different set of cases and chose to answer a different set of questions; the Court accepts only 100–200 of the more than 7,000 cases that it is asked to review each year. In addition, all cases are valued equally even though some cases are much more important than others. Moreover, recent consequential cases decided through the "shadow docket" are not included at all. Still, these graphs offer an indication of the overall ideological orientation of the justices and provide a visualization of changes in the Court's orientation over time.

== Ideological shifts since 1937 ==
In the early 1930s, which is earlier than the data on the Martin–Quinn graph, the "Four Horsemen" (justices James McReynolds, Pierce Butler, George Sutherland, and Willis Van Devanter) mostly opposed the New Deal agenda proposed by President Franklin D. Roosevelt. The liberal "Three Musketeers" (justices Harlan Stone, Benjamin Cardozo, and Louis Brandeis) generally supported the New Deal. Two justices (Chief Justice Charles Evans Hughes and Justice Owen Roberts) normally cast the swing votes.

The Martin–Quinn graph (and underlying data) shows that, by the 1939 term, Roosevelt had moved the Court to a more liberal position by appointing four new justices including strong liberals Hugo Black, William O. Douglas, and Frank Murphy. Led by the increasingly conservative chief justices Harlan F. Stone and Fred M. Vinson, the Court shifted in a more conservative direction through the 1940s and early 1950s.

President Dwight Eisenhower appointed Earl Warren to be chief justice in 1953, and both graphs indicate that the Court then turned in a more liberal direction as Warren himself grew substantially more liberal and especially when he was joined by strong liberal justices William J. Brennan Jr., Arthur Goldberg, Abe Fortas, and Thurgood Marshall, although justices Black and Felix Frankfurter became slightly more conservative over time. In the 1970s, the Court shifted in a more conservative direction when President Richard Nixon appointed Chief Justice Warren Burger and conservative justices Lewis Powell, William Rehnquist, and Harry Blackmun, and more so when President Ronald Reagan elevated Rehnquist to chief justice, although Blackmun became more liberal over time. The Court shifted to an even more conservative orientation when it was joined by strong conservative justices Antonin Scalia (appointed by President Ronald Reagan), Clarence Thomas (appointed by President George H. W. Bush), and Samuel Alito and Chief Justice John Roberts (both whom were appointed by President George W. Bush). During this time, Justice David Souter became more liberal.

Since 2020, the Roberts Court is more conservative, with six conservative justices that include justices Neil Gorsuch, Brett Kavanaugh, and Amy Coney Barrett (appointed by President Donald Trump). Dissenting in many key cases are justices Sonia Sotomayor and Elena Kagan (appointed by President Barack Obama). In 2022, Justice Stephen Breyer (appointed by President Bill Clinton) retired and was replaced by Ketanji Brown Jackson (appointed by President Joe Biden). Jackson is widely considered to be, like Breyer, an ideological liberal.

The most volatile seat appears to be Seat 10 (light blue lines), which was held by conservative Pierce Butler until 1939, then liberal Frank Murphy until 1949, then moderate-conservative Tom Clark until 1967, then strong liberal Thurgood Marshall until 1991, and then strong conservative Clarence Thomas. The path of Justice Harry Blackmun illustrates the ideological drift shown by many justices. Blackmun (purple line) had a conservative score (Quinn–Martin = 1.459; Bailey = 1.289) in the 1969–70 term, his first on the bench, but had shifted to a liberal score (Quinn–Martin = −1.940; Bailey = −1.188) by the 1993–94 term, his last. The median justice (shown with a yellow background line) was Byron White (orange line) for most of the time from 1969 to 1989, Sandra Day O'Connor (dark brown line) from 1999 to 2005, Anthony Kennedy (green line) from 2006 to 2017, John Roberts (black line) in 2018 and 2019, and Brett Kavanaugh (green line) since 2020.

The graphs show that since the 1938 term every chief justice (black lines), except Earl Warren and John Roberts (since about 2020), has had a more conservative ideological lean than the median justice on the Court.

== Career liberal voting percentage by issue area from 1946–2017 ==
The following sortable table (Note: To sort, click on the arrow in the header. To sort by multiple columns, click on the first column's sort arrow, then shift-click on subsequent columns' sort arrows.) lists the lifetime percentage liberal scores of Supreme Court justices as compiled in the Supreme Court Database. The table shows data for justices whose service began at or after the 1946 term; the data ends with the 2016–2017 term.

In the Supreme Court Database, liberal represents the voting direction of the justices across the various issue areas. It is most appropriate in the areas of criminal procedure, civil rights, and First Amendment cases, where it signifies pro-defendant votes in criminal procedure cases, pro-women, or pro-minorities in civil rights cases, and pro-individual against the government in First Amendment cases. In takings clause cases, a pro-government/anti-owner vote is considered liberal. In labor union cases, pro-union votes against both individuals and the government are considered liberal, and in economic cases, the term represents pro-government votes against challenges to federal regulatory authority and pro-competition, anti-business, pro-liability, pro-injured person, and pro-bankruptcy decisions. In federalism and federal taxation cases, the term indicates pro-national government positions.

- No. (justice number) – order that Supreme Court justice was appointed
- Justice – justice's name
- Year confirmed – year confirmed to the Supreme Court
- Position – Chief Justice or Associate Justice
- Criminal procedure – a higher number means pro-defendant votes in cases involving the rights of persons accused of crime, except for the due process rights of prisoners.
- Civil rights – a higher number means more votes permitting intervention on freedom cases which pertain to classifications based on race (including Native Americans), age, indigence, voting, residence, military, or handicapped status, sex, or alienage.
- First Amendment – a higher number reflects votes that advocate individual freedoms with regard to speech.
- Union – a higher number means pro-union votes in cases involving labor activity.
- Economic – a higher number means more votes against commercial business activity, plus litigation involving injured persons or things, employee actions concerning employers, zoning regulations, and governmental regulation of corruption other than that involving campaign spending.
- Federalism – a higher number means votes for a larger, more empowered government in conflicts between the federal and state governments, excluding those between state and federal courts, and those involving the priority of federal fiscal claims.
- Federal taxes – a higher number means more votes widening the government's ability to define and enforce tax concepts and policies in cases involving the Internal Revenue Code and related statutes.

Note: A highlighted row indicates that the Justice is currently serving on the Court.

No.	Justice	Year confirmed	Year departed	Position	Criminal procedure	Civil rights	First amendment	Union	Economic	Federalism	Federal taxes
85	Fred M. Vinson	1946	1953	Chief Justice	27.0%	45.3%	26.2%	34.1%	59.9%	51.5%	74.5%
86	Tom C. Clark	1949	1967	Associate Justice	32.1%	53.5%	37.1%	61.9%	72.5%	51.3%	74.8%
87	Sherman Minton	1949	1956	Associate Justice	23.1%	36.2%	27.0%	55.9%	62.0%	53.3%	75.6%
88	Earl Warren	1953	1969	Chief Justice	73.3%	81.0%	83.5%	70.2%	81.3%	72.1%	80.0%
89	John Marshall Harlan II	1955	1971	Associate Justice	37.8%	42.0%	44.2%	53.8%	36.7%	50.0%	70.6%
90	William J. Brennan Jr.	1956	1990	Associate Justice	76.2%	82.5%	84.5%	65.8%	69.8%	66.3%	70.3%
91	Charles Evans Whittaker	1957	1962	Associate Justice	39.8%	44.2%	36.5%	40.5%	33.6%	52.4%	63.2%
92	Potter Stewart	1958	1981	Associate Justice	44.9%	48.4%	63.0%	57.3%	45.0%	56.5%	66.4%
93	Byron White	1962	1993	Associate Justice	32.9%	55.2%	39.2%	62.6%	59.3%	66.9%	84.7%
94	Arthur Goldberg	1962	1965	Associate Justice	75.0%	98.0%	96.2%	61.1%	63.2%	53.3%	77.3%
95	Abe Fortas	1965	1969	Associate Justice	81.5%	82.1%	79.5%	60.0%	72.2%	64.3%	46.7%
96	Thurgood Marshall	1967	1991	Associate Justice	80.1%	84.5%	83.4%	68.9%	63.0%	68.6%	74.2%
97	Warren E. Burger	1969	1986	Chief Justice	19.0%	37.4%	30.9%	43.3%	45.0%	66.7%	72.1%
98	Harry Blackmun	1970	1994	Associate Justice	42.3%	62.1%	56.2%	61.8%	55.0%	67.4%	74.4%
99	Lewis F. Powell Jr.	1972	1987	Associate Justice	28.4%	40.3%	46.1%	51.1%	45.6%	59.0%	56.1%
100	William Rehnquist (Note: William Rehnquist's terms as associate justice and chief justice are listed separately.)	1972	1986	Associate Justice	14.1%	24.1%	18.1%	48.9%	43.5%	29.1%	62.5%
101	John Paul Stevens	1975	2010	Associate Justice	66.9%	64.3%	66.9%	63.9%	56.2%	56.9%	59.4%
102	Sandra Day O'Connor	1981	2006	Associate Justice	26.4%	45.4%	41.8%	42.7%	46.5%	48.3%	58.9%
(100)	William Rehnquist	1986	2005	Chief Justice	19.6%	30.6%	26.1%	33.3%	49.4%	46.1%	77.8%
103	Antonin Scalia	1986	2016	Associate Justice	27.4%	30.6%	30.5%	33.8%	46.2%	52.0%	69.7%
104	Anthony Kennedy	1988	2018	Associate Justice	33.3%	44.0%	46.0%	39.7%	44.6%	56.3%	81.0%
105	David Souter	1990	2009	Associate Justice	57.2%	69.3%	70.8%	58.8%	54.2%	64.8%	70.7%
106	Clarence Thomas	1991	—	Associate Justice	22.4%	25.0%	32.2%	30.8%	46.2%	47.4%	58.7%
107	Ruth Bader Ginsburg	1993	2020	Associate Justice	62.3%	70.0%	69.4%	72.2%	56.6%	60.6%	80.6%
108	Stephen Breyer	1994	2022	Associate Justice	55.6%	69.7%	55.8%	77.1%	50.0%	67.7%	79.4%
109	John Roberts	2005	—	Chief Justice	31.1%	42.4%	50.0%	41.2%	44.5%	73.2%	90.9%
110	Samuel Alito	2006	—	Associate Justice	18.6%	38.8%	39.0%	31.3%	42.4%	68.4%	81.8%
111	Sonia Sotomayor	2009	—	Associate Justice	66.9%	70.7%	67.7%	61.5%	50.0%	63.0%	100.0%
112	Elena Kagan	2010	—	Associate Justice	62.5%	71.9%	68.0%	66.7%	50.0%	75.0%	80.0%
113	Neil Gorsuch (Note: Percentages for Neil Gorsuch might be misleading since he had participated in only a few cases through 2017.)	2017	—	Associate Justice	0.0%	50.0%	100.0%	No cases	33.3%	No cases	No cases
114	Brett Kavanaugh	2018	—	Associate Justice							
115	Amy Coney Barrett	2020	—	Associate Justice							
116	Ketanji Brown Jackson	2022	—	Associate Justice							

== See also ==
- Judicial activism
- Judicial appointment history for United States federal courts
- Judicial Common Space
- Judicial discretion
- Judicial restraint
- List of justices of the Supreme Court of the United States
- Martin-Quinn score
- Models of judicial decision making
- Segal–Cover score
