= Virginia Gray (political scientist) =

American political scientist

- Education: Hendrix College; Washington University in St. Louis
- Awards: Namesake for Virginia Gray Award, APSA
- Scientific career
- Fields: Political science
- Workplaces: University of Minnesota; University of North Carolina at Chapel Hill

Virginia Gray (born 1945) is an American political scientist, currently the Robert Watson Winston Distinguished Professor of Political Science Emerita at the University of North Carolina at Chapel Hill. She studies public policy and interest groups with a particular focus on U.S. state politics. Her work on policy diffusion, which concerns how innovation in policies within one region can lead to adoptions of that policy by other regions, has been cited as foundational in developing that research topic.

== Education and early career ==
Gray attended Hendrix College, where she earned a BA. She then graduated with an MA from Washington University in St. Louis, followed by a PhD from the same institution in 1972. Gray was a professor at the University of Kentucky for two years, then at the University of Minnesota until 2001, when she moved to the University of North Carolina, Chapel Hill. She has also been a visiting professor at the University of British Columbia, University of Oslo, and Nankai University.

== Career ==
Gray has been credited with conducting foundational research on the topic of policy diffusion, which is the notion that innovations in public policies can travel between regions as states adopt ideas that other states have successfully pioneered. Gray published an article on the topic in the American Political Science Review in 1973, and in Gary F. Moncrief and Peverill Squire's textbook Why States Matter: An Introduction to State Politics, they write that Gray's article is one of two articles that "one must begin with" in order to understand policy diffusion. Gray has also studied gender and politics, as in her and Pamela Conover's 1983 book Feminism and the New Right: Conflict over the American Family, which studied how the American New Right formed in opposition to the American feminist movement.

In 1996, Gray and David Lowery coauthored the book The Population Ecology of Interest Representation: Lobbying Communities in the American States. The authors argue that variations in the focus and quantity of interest groups across US states affects lobbying and legislative activities, which changes the policies that are produced. Susan B. Hansen wrote that Gray and Lowery "have an ambitious purpose: to transform the focus of studies of interest group politics", using a metaphor to population ecology rather than a more traditional organizational theory approach.

In 2013, the State Politics and Policy Section of the American Political Science Association created the Virginia Gray Award in her honor. The award is given annually for the best political science book on U.S. state politics or policy from the previous three years.

A book that Gray co-edited, Politics in the American States: A comparative analysis, has been printed in 11 editions. It was the recipient of the American Political Science Association's 2017 Mac Jewell Enduring Contribution Book Award, which is awarded "every three years to a political science book on the subject of U.S. state politics or policy published at least 10 years prior to the award being bestowed that stands as an enduring contribution to the literature", specifically "those classic works" which "have been crucial in setting the direction of scholarship the field since their publication." And in 2022 Gray was elected to membership in the American Academy of Arts and Sciences <https://www.amacad.org/directory?search_api_fulltext=Virginia%20Gray&field_class_section=All&field_class_section_1=All&field_deceased=All&sort_bef_combine=search_api_relevance_DESCSciences>

In 2004, Gray served as the president of the Midwest Political Science Association. In 2019, a citation analysis by the political scientists Hannah June Kim and Bernard Grofman listed Gray among the top 40 most cited women currently working as a political scientist at an American university.

Gray's political analysis in the public media has included several appearances on C-SPAN.

== Selected works ==
- "Innovation in the states: A diffusion study", American Political Science Review (1973)
- Feminism and the New Right Conflict over the American Family, with Pamela Conover (1983)
- The Population Ecology of Interest Representation: Lobbying Communities in the American States, with David Lowery (1996)
- Politics in the American states: A comparative analysis, coeditor with Russell L. Hanson and Thad Kousser, 11th edition published in 2017

== Selected awards ==
- Namesake of the Virginia Gray award, American Political Science Association (2013)
- Mac Jewell Enduring Contribution Book Award, American Political Science Association (2017)
