= Clara Penniman =

American political scientist

- Born: April 5, 1914; Steger, Illinois
- Died: January 30, 2009 (aged 94)
- Education: University of Wisconsin–Madison; University of Minnesota
- Scientific career
- Fields: Political science
- Workplaces: Wisconsin State Employment Service; War Manpower Commission; University of Wisconsin–Madison

Clara Penniman (April 5, 1914—January 30, 2009) was an American political scientist. She was a professor of political science at the University of Wisconsin–Madison from 1953 until 1984, and from 1974 onwards she held the Oscar Rennebohm Chair for Public Administration. Penniman was also the founder and first director of the Center for the Study of Public Policy and Administration at the University of Wisconsin–Madison, which later became the Robert M. La Follette School of Public Affairs. Penniman was the first woman to be the chair of the department of political science at the University of Wisconsin, and the first woman to be elected president of the Midwest Political Science Association. She was a specialist in taxation and public finance, publishing several books and articles on these topics.

== Education and early life ==
Penniman was born on April 5, 1914, in Steger, Illinois, to Alethea B. Penniman and Rae E. Penniman. She attended high school in Lancaster, Wisconsin. After graduating from high school, she worked in a number of roles for the state government of Wisconsin, including the Wisconsin State Employment Service. During World War II, Penniman worked for the War Manpower Commission.

Penniman's work for the state of Wisconsin lasted for 10 years. She then returned to school, receiving a BA and an MA from the University of Wisconsin–Madison. In 1954 she graduated from the University of Minnesota with a PhD in political science.

== Career ==
=== Academic positions ===
Penniman joined the faculty of political science at the University of Wisconsin–Madison in 1953. At that time she was the only woman to be a member of the political science faculty at the University of Wisconsin–Madison. From 1963 until 1966 she was the chair of that department, and was the first woman to hold that position.

In 1965, Penniman became the Vice President of the Midwest Political Science Association. She then became the President of the organization in 1966, and was the first woman to do so. This was years before the same milestone would occur in other major professional associations in American political science like the American Political Science Association, although Penniman was also the Vice President of that organization in 1971–1972. She was also a member of the University Committee at the University of Wisconsin–Madison, and the Merger Implementation Study Committee which made recommendations for restructuring the state university system.

In 1968, Penniman founded the Center for the Study of Public Policy and Administration at the University of Wisconsin–Madison, and served as its first director. In 1983, the organization was renamed to the La Follette Institute of Public Affairs.

Penniman served on several state commissions and in advocacy groups, including substantial involvement in the League of Women Voters at both the local and state level.

=== Research ===
Penniman published several books and articles on the topics of taxation policy and public finance, especially in the state of Wisconsin. These include State income tax administration (1959), The politics of taxation (1976), and State income taxation (1980). In 1974, Penniman was elected as a fellow of the American Academy of Public Administration.

Penniman retired and became a professor emerita in 1984. However, she continued to publish well after her retirement; she was a co-author of the 1999 book Madison, An Administration History of Wisconsin's Capital City 1929-79.

== Impact ==
Penniman is the namesake for several awards and prizes. The Penniman Prize is awarded annually to a graduating student of the La Follette Institute of Public Affairs who wrote the most outstanding paper in public affairs.

Penniman has been consistently described as one of the founding figures in the study of political science at the University of Wisconsin–Madison and in the American midwest generally, as well as being an important mentor to generations of students. The La Follette School has called Penniman a "nationally prominent scholar of taxation and public finance".

== Selected works ==
- State income tax administration (1959)
- The politics of taxation (1976)
- State income taxation (1980)
- Madison, An Administration History of Wisconsin's Capital City 1929-79, co-authored (1999)

== Selected awards ==
- Outstanding Achievement Award, University of Minnesota Alumni Association (1976)
- Distinguished Alumni Award, University of Wisconsin Alumni Association (1982)
- Fellow, National Academy of Public Administration
