= Ada Finifter =

American political scientist

Ada W. Finifter
- Born: June 6, 1938
- Died: October 29, 2011 (aged 73)
- Education: Brooklyn College; University of Michigan; University of Wisconsin, Madison
- Scientific career
- Fields: Political science
- Workplaces: Andrés Bello Catholic University; Michigan State University
- Doctoral advisor: J. Austin Ranney

Ada Weintraub Finifter (June 6, 1938—October 29, 2011) was an American political scientist. She specialized in American public opinion and voting behavior.

== Education and academic positions ==
Finifter was born in Brooklyn on June 6, 1938. Finifter graduated from Brooklyn College with a degree in political science in 1959, and then earned an MA at the University of Michigan.

Finifter then joined the political science faculty at Andrés Bello Catholic University as a member of the Peace Corps, working there for one year before returning to the United States and beginning a political science PhD at the University of Wisconsin, Madison. There she studied with J. Austin Ranney, obtaining her PhD in 1967. Finifter was hired as a political science professor at Michigan State University, becoming an associate professor in 1972 and a professor in 1981. In 1978, Finifter was a visiting scholar at the Australian National University.

== Research ==
Finifter wrote several books, one of the most notable being Alienation and the Social System (1972). She also wrote an early text on personal computer use, Using the IBM Personal Computer: EasyWriter (1984). She edited several books as well, including The State of the Discipline (1983).

Finifter was the president of the Midwest Political Science Association in the year 1986–87. She was the editor of the American Political Science Review from March 1996 until December 2001.
