= Andrew D. Martin =

American political scientist (born 1972)

Andrew Martin
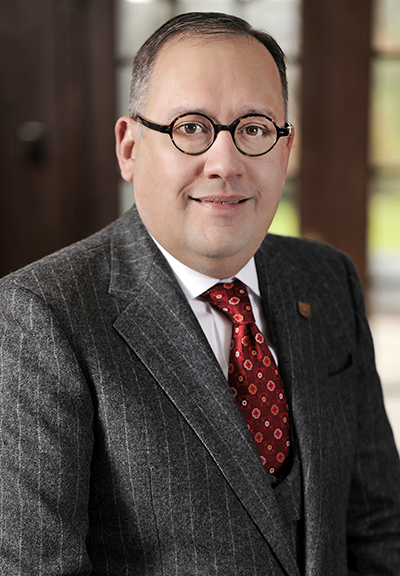
- Martin in 2024

15th Chancellor of Washington University in St. Louis
- Incumbent
- Assumed office June 1, 2019
- Preceded by: Mark S. Wrighton

Dean of the College of Literature, Science, and the Arts at the University of Michigan
- In office 2014–2018
- Preceded by: Terrence McDonald
- Succeeded by: Anne Curzan

Personal details
- Born: July 25, 1972 (age 54) Lafayette, Indiana, U.S.
- Education: College of William and Mary (BA); Washington University in St. Louis (PhD)

Academic background
- Thesis: Strategic decision-making and the separation of powers (1998)
- Doctoral advisor: Lee Epstein

Academic work
- Discipline: Political science
- Institutions: Washington University in St. Louis; University of Michigan

Andrew D. Martin (born July 25, 1972) is an American political scientist, currently serving as the 15th chancellor of Washington University in St. Louis since June 2019. He served as dean of the College of Literature, Science, and the Arts at the University of Michigan from 2014 to 2018.

== Career ==
From 2014 to 2018, Martin served as dean of the College of Literature, Science, and the Arts at the University of Michigan.

=== Washington University in St. Louis ===
Martin was appointed WashU's 15th chancellor by the university's board of trustees on July 14, 2018. He started his full-time service as Chancellor-elect on January 1, 2019, and as Chancellor on June 1, 2019.

At his 2019 inauguration, Martin introduced the WashU Pledge, a financial support offering to some eligible Missouri and southern Illinois students. In 2021, he launched the $1 billion Gateway to Success initiative. In 2023, the university adopted a no-loan policy, replacing federal loans with scholarships and grants starting in fall 2024.

In February 2019, Martin announced the creation of the Center for the Study of Race, Ethnicity, and Equity, which was launched in August 2020.

During Martin's tenure as chancellor, Washington University responded to COVID-19 by initiating a campus shutdown and remote operations earlier than local mandates. The university delayed the start of the 2020 fall and 2021 spring terms, reinstated retirement and salary programs, and developed a scalable saliva-based diagnostic test at the School of Medicine.

In 2024, Martin started a local engagement campaign "In St. Louis, for St. Louis", extended local offerings through the School of Continuing and Professional Studies, and launched the St. Louis Confluence Collaborative. WashU's economic influence on the local areas in fiscal year 2024 was $8.8 billion.

==== Israeli–Palestinian conflict ====
On April 13, 2024, a peaceful sit‑in took place on the Danforth campus, resulting in the arrest of 12 students by WashU police during the protest.

On April 20, 2024, a larger group of students, faculty, and community members set up an encampment outside Brookings Hall. On April 27, 2024, Martin called local police to address the pro-Palestinian protest. The police crackdown arrested around 100 protestors, including 23 students and at least four employees. Some students and faculty faced disciplinary action. A professor was arrested for interfering with police and later hospitalized with broken ribs and a hand after being tackled by officers.

WashU students, faculty, and community members denounced the Martin administration with open letters and petitions regarding its response to the protests, including Martin's decision to evict arrested students from campus housing and ban faculty who attended the protest from campus. Martin's actions were condemned by United States Representative Cori Bush (D–MO) and the St. Louis city leadership, while being praised by some pundits and some elected officials.

==== Workday implementation controversy ====
During Martin's tenure as chancellor, WashU faced scrutiny over the cost and transparency of its implementation of Workday and Student Sunrise, a project to replace WebSTAC and other legacy student, finance, and human-resources systems. The cost of the transition was not publicly known until 2025, when Student Life, the university's independent student newspaper, reported that it had obtained an internal financial document showing that WashU had spent almost $235 million on Workday.

The disclosure came amid broader criticism of the university's finances following Martin's September 2025 announcement that WashU had eliminated 316 staff positions and closed 198 open positions. In October 2025, undergraduate students, graduate students and faculty protested outside a closed Faculty Senate Council meeting with executive vice chancellor for finance and chief financial officer David Gray, calling for greater financial transparency. The protest followed an August faculty petition seeking more information about WashU's financial condition, including spending on Workday and the university's purchase of Fontbonne University. Some protesters held signs reading "Support Workers not Workday."

In December 2025, Student Life published a more detailed breakdown based on information provided by Gray, reporting that the total cost of the Workday and Student Sunrise projects had exceeded $265 million over at least seven years. The technology publication The Register later reported that the disclosure followed student protests over the project and university finances.

The reported cost drew further scrutiny because WashU schools had experienced four consecutive years of increased prorations, payments made by the university's schools to the Central Fiscal Unit, which includes the chancellor's office and other central administrative functions. According to slides shown by Gray at the Faculty Senate Council meeting, proration increases accounted for an additional $200 million paid by WashU schools between fiscal years 2022 and 2026.

== Academics ==
Martin co-authored An Introduction to Empirical Legal Research with Lee Epstein and Judicial Decision-Making: A Coursebook with Barry Friedman and others. His academic contributions include the development of the Martin-Quinn scores, created with Kevin Quinn, which estimate the ideological positions of United States Supreme Court justices.

In 2021, Martin was elected to the American Academy of Arts and Sciences.
