= James L. Gibson =

American political scientist

James L. Gibson is an American political scientist whose major theoretical and empirical contributions deal with the legitimacy of court systems, democratization and transitional justice, and political intolerance. As of 2026, he is Provost's Research Professor in the Political Science Department at Florida State University.

== Background ==
Gibson graduated from Emory University in 1972 with a B.A. in Political Science and from University of Iowa in 1975 with a Ph.D. in Political Science. He is a member of Phi Beta Kappa.

== Career ==
Before joining the Florida State University Political Science faculty in 2026, he served as the Sidney W. Souers Professor of Government at Washington University in St. Louis. He has also had visiting appointments at the Russell Sage Foundation (2001-02 and 2012-13), the Institute for Justice and Reconciliation in South Africa (2000-06), Stanford Law School (2009), and Columbia University (2012-13). Since 2000, he has also held the position of Professor Extraordinary in Political Science at Stellenbosch University in South Africa. Gibson began his academic career at the University of Wisconsin-Milwaukee (1975–1983), moving to the University of Houston (1983–1999), where he was the Cullen Distinguished Professor (1996–1999).

Separate studies in 2019 and 2025 listed him as the most prolific publisher of major political science articles in the world. His work has received over 26,000 citations. As of February 2026 he has an h-index score of 85.

Gibson served as President of the Midwest Political Science Association in 1999.

== Scholarly contributions ==
Gibson has published over 240 scholarly works. His work covers a broad range of topics in politics, including judicial and constitutional studies, American constitutional law and politics, legal and constitutional studies, policing practices and perceptions, electoral systems and political participation, social media and politics, and law, rights, and freedoms. His most recognized work relates to the institutional legitimacy of courts, transitional justice in South Africa, and political intolerance.

=== Institutional legitimacy of courts ===
Focused primarily on the U.S. Supreme Court, this work seeks to explain how the Court maintains its legitimacy despite making highly salient and controversial rulings. This work was recognized with the 2011 Lifetime Achievement Award from the Law and Politics Section of the American Political Science Association, and the International Society of Political Psychology's 2021 Harold Lasswell Award for Outstanding Scientific Accomplishment in Political Psychology.

=== Transitional justice in South Africa ===
The transition from apartheid in South Africa was extensively examined by Gibson in the "Overcoming Trilogy", three books on post-apartheid democracy in South Africa: Overcoming Historical Injustices: Land Reconciliation in South Africa. New York: Cambridge University Press, 2009; Overcoming Apartheid: Can Truth Reconcile a Divided Nation? New York: Russell Sage Foundation 2004; Overcoming Intolerance in South Africa: Experiments in Democratic Persuasion. New York: Cambridge University Press, 2003 (with Amanda Gouws). This, and related work in the former Soviet Union, was recognized by the 2005 Decade of Behavior Research Award.

=== Political intolerance ===
Gibson has studied tolerance and intolerance in a variety of setting, including the McCarthy era in American politics, gay rights, and Neo-Nazis marching in Skokie. His 1988 article "Political Intolerance and Political Repression during the McCarthy Red Scare" was awarded the Heinz Eulau Award by the American Political Science Association as the best article published in the American Political Science Review that year.

== Works ==
=== Major books ===
Democracy's Destruction? Changing Perceptions of the Supreme Court, the Presidency, and the Senate after the 2020 Election. New York: Russell Sage Foundation 2024. ISBN 978-0-87154-865-8

Black and Blue: How African Americans Judge the U.S. Legal System. New York: Oxford University Press, 2018. (with Michael J. Nelson) ISBN 978-0-19-086521-4

Electing Judges: The Surprising Effects of Campaigning on Judicial Legitimacy. Chicago: University of Chicago Press, 2012. ISBN 978-0-226-29108-6

Overcoming Historical Injustices: Land Reconciliation in South Africa. New York: Cambridge University Press, 2009. ISBN 978-0-521-51788-1

Citizens, Courts, and Confirmations: Positivity Theory and the Judgments of the American People. Princeton, NJ: Princeton University Press, 2009. (with Gregory A. Caldeira) ISBN 978-0-691-13988-3

Overcoming Apartheid: Can Truth Reconcile a Divided Nation? New York: Russell Sage Foundation, 2004. ISBN 978-0-87154-312-7

Overcoming Intolerance in South Africa: Experiments in Democratic Persuasion. New York: Cambridge University Press, 2003. (with Amanda Gouws) ISBN 978-0-521-81390-7

=== Selected articles ===
Gibson, James L., Gregory A. Caldeira, and Vanessa Baird. 1998. "On the Legitimacy of National High Courts." American Political Science Review 92 (#2, June): 343-358. doi.org/10.2307/2585668

Gibson, James L. 2006. "Overcoming Apartheid: Can Truth Reconcile a Divided Nation?" The Annals of the American Academy of Political and Social Science 603 (#1, January): 82-110. Overcoming Apartheid: Can Truth Reconcile a Divided Nation?

Caldeira, Gregory A., and James L. Gibson. 1992. "The Etiology of Public Support for the Supreme Court." American Journal of Political Science 36 (#3, August): 635-664. doi.org/10.2307/2111585

Gibson, James L., Gregory A. Caldeira, and Lester Kenyatta Spence. 2003. "Measuring Attitudes toward the United States Supreme Court." American Journal of Political Science 47 (#2, April): 354-367. doi.org/10.2307/3186144

Gibson, James L., Raymond M. Duch and Kent L. Tedin. 1992. "Democratic Values and the Transformation of the Soviet Union." Journal of Politics 54 (#2, May): 329-371. doi.org/10.2307/2132030

Gibson, James L. 1989. "Understandings of Justice: Institutional Legitimacy, Procedural Justice, and Political Tolerance." Law and Society Review 23 (#3):469-496. doi.org/10.2307/3053830

Gibson, James L. 2004. "Does Truth Lead to Reconciliation? Testing the Causal Assumptions of the South African Truth and Reconciliation Process." American Journal of Political Science 48 (#2, April): 201-217. doi.org/10.2307/1519878

Gibson, James L. 1978. "Judges' Role Orientations, Attitudes and Decisions: An Interactive Model." American Political Science Review 72 (#3, September): 911-924. doi.org/10.2307/1955111

Gibson, James L., Gregory A. Caldeira, and Lester Kenyatta Spence. 2003. "The Supreme Court and the U.S. Presidential Election of 2000: Wounds, Self-Inflicted or Otherwise?" British Journal of Political Science 33: (#4, October): 535-556. The Supreme Court and the US Presidential Election of 2000: Wounds, Self-Inflicted or Otherwise?

Caldeira, Gregory A., and James L. Gibson. 1995. "The Legitimacy of the Court of Justice in the European Union: Models of Institutional Support." American Political Science Review 89 (#2, June): 356-376. doi.org/10.2307/2082430
