= Jeffrey A. Segal =

American political scientist

- Born: Jeffrey Allan Segal; October 3, 1956 (age 69)
- Education: State University of New York at Albany; Michigan State University
- Awards: Guggenheim Fellowship (2011–2012)
- Scientific career
- Fields: Political science
- Institutions: Stony Brook University
- Thesis: Predicting Supreme Court Cases Probabilistically: The Search and Seizure Cases, 1962-1981 (1983)

Jeffrey Allan Segal (born October 3, 1956) is an American political scientist who serves as a SUNY Distinguished Professor at Stony Brook University, where he was formerly the chair of the Political Science Department. He received a Guggenheim Fellowship in political science in 2011 and was named a fellow of the American Academy of Arts and Sciences in 2012. He formerly served as a Visiting Professor of American Politics at Harvard University, as a Visiting Senior Research Scholar at the Center for the Study of Democratic Politics at Princeton University, and as president of the Midwest Political Science Association.
