= Edward Carmines =

American political scientist (1946–2025)

Edward G. Carmines
- Born: April 2, 1946; Hampton, Virginia, U.S.
- Died: July 7, 2025 (aged 79)
- Education: College of William & Mary; University at Buffalo
- Occupation: Political scientist
- Employer: Indiana University
- Title: Distinguished Professor, Warner O. Chapman Professor of Political Science, and Rudy Professor

Edward Graham Carmines (April 2, 1946 – July 7, 2025) was an American political scientist, who served as Distinguished Professor, Warner O. Chapman Professor of Political Science, and Rudy Professor at Indiana University. At IU, he directed the Center on American Politics and served as Director of Research for the Center on Representative Government until his retirement in 2025.

== Life and career ==
Carmines was born in Hampton, Virginia on April 2, 1946. He graduated from Old Dominion University, received his Master's from the College of William & Mary, and earned his PhD at the University at Buffalo.

He was appointed Assistant Professor of Political Science at Indiana University in 1976, promoted to Associate Professor in 1980 and to full Professor in 1984. He received the title of Rudy Professor of Political Science in 1993, and Warner O. Chapman Professor of Political Science in 2001 He became Distinguished Professor in 2013. He died on July 7, 2025, at the age of 79.

== Honors ==
Carmines was elected Fellow, American Association for the Advancement of Science, 2011 and Fellow, American Academy of Arts and Sciences in 2012.

== Published books ==
Carmines' published books are:

- Beyond the Left-Right Divide: Ideological Diversity and the Future of American Politics (with Michael Ensley and Michael W. Wagner) Harvard University Press, in press.
- Reaching Beyond Race (with Paul M. Sniderman) Cambridge: Harvard University Press, 1997
- Prejudice, Politics and the American Dilemma (edited with Paul M. Sniderman and Philip E. Tetlock) Stanford: Stanford University Press, 1993
- Issue Evolution: Race and the Transformation of American Politics (with James A. Stimson) Princeton: Princeton University Press, 1989
- Unidimensional Scaling (with John P. McIver) Sage University Paper Series on Quantitative Applications in the Social Sciences, Beverly Hills and London: Sage Publications, 1981
- Measurement in the Social Sciences: The Link Between Theory and Data (with Richard A. Zeller) New York: Cambridge University Press, 1980
- Reliability and Validity Assessment (with Richard A. Zeller) Sage University Paper Series on Quantitative Applications in the Social Sciences, Beverly Hills and London: Sage Publications, 1979
- Statistical Analysis of Social Data (with Richard A. Zeller) Chicago: Rand McNally, 1978)
