= American Journal of Political Science =

Academic journal

- Discipline: Political science
- Language: English
- Edited by: Kathleen Dolan, University of Wisconsin – Milwaukee Jennifer L. Lawless, University of Virginia

Publication details
- Former name: Midwest Journal of Political Science
- History: 1957–present
- Publisher: Wiley-Blackwell for the Midwest Political Science Association (United States)
- Frequency: Quarterly

Standard abbreviations
- ISO 4: Am. J. Political Sci.
- NLM: Am J Pol Sci

Indexing
- ISSN: 0092-5853 (print); 1540-5907 (web)
- LCCN: 73647828
- JSTOR: 00925853
- OCLC no.: 884770809

Links
- Journal homepage; Online access; Online archive

The American Journal of Political Science is an academic journal published by the Midwest Political Science Association. It was formerly known as the Midwest Journal of Political Science. According to the Journal Citation Reports, it has a 2016 impact factor of 5.044, ranking it 1st out of 165 journals in the category "Political Science". According to SCImago Journal & Country Rank, it ranks 3rd best in the field of Political Science and Sociology. Also by other authors it is ranked among 5 best journals in political science including American politics, public policy, international relations, comparative politics, political methodology, and political theory.

== See also ==
- List of political science journals
