= Lee Epstein =

American political scientist (born 1958)

- Born: March 17, 1958 (age 68)
- Education: Emory University
- Scientific career
- Fields: Political science
- Workplaces: Washington University in St. Louis

Lee Epstein (born March 17, 1958) is an American political scientist who is the Ethan A. H. Shepley Distinguished University Professor at Washington University in St. Louis. She is also a Distinguished Visiting Professor at the Hebrew University of Jerusalem (2020–present) and the University of Southern California (2024–present).

== Career ==
=== Education ===
Epstein received her B.A. in political science and sociology (with high honors) from Emory University in 1980. She received her master's degree in political science from Emory in 1982, and her doctorate in political science from Emory in 1983.

=== University positions ===
After receiving her doctorate at Emory University, Epstein taught at Emory for three years as an assistant professor of political science. Next, she worked at Southern Methodist University first as an assistant professor and then as an associate professor of political science for a total of five years. In 1991, she began teaching in the political science department at Washington University in St. Louis. Epstein served as the chair of the political science department from 1995 to 1999 and then again in 2003. In 1998, she was appointed as the Mallinckrodt Distinguished University Professor of Political Science and served in that role until 2006. She also taught in the Washington University School of Law as a professor of law from 2000 to 2006.

From 2006 to 2011, Epstein taught at Northwestern University, first as the Beatrice Kuhn Professor of Law, and next a university-wide chair as the Henry Wade Rogers Professor. Next, from 2011 to 2015, she served as the Provost Professor of Law and Political Science and the Rader Family Trustee Chair in Law at the University of Southern California. In 2015, she returned to Washington University in St. Louis and was appointed as the Ethan A. H. Shepley Professor and distinguished professor. She teaches political science and law at the undergraduate and graduate levels at WashU and is also the co-director at WashU's Center for Empirical Research in Law. Epstein was previously University Professor of Law & Political Science and the Hillard Distinguished Professor of Law at the University of Southern California.

=== Research and work ===
Epstein is the author or co-author of 18 books and over 100 articles and essays.

=== Honors ===
Epstein is an Elected Fellow of the American Academy of Arts and Sciences and American Academy of Political and Social Science.
