= George Ruge =

George Ruge may refer to:

- George H. Ruge (1921–2011), American radio broadcaster
- George Marshall Ruge, American film director, actor and writer
