= Balboa High School (California) =

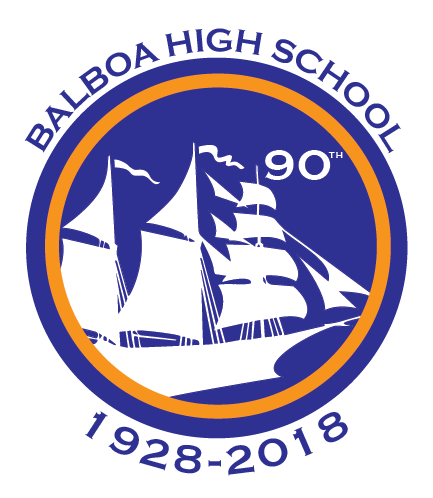

Location
- 1000 Cayuga Avenue; San Francisco, San Francisco, California 94112; United States; 37°43′18.58″N 122°26′27.86″W

Information
- Motto: First on the Pacific
- Founded: 1928
- School district: SFUSD
- Superintendent: Maria Su
- School code: 439
- CEEB code: 052916
- NCES School ID: 05587
- Principal: Dorian Campos
- Teaching staff: 59.71 (FTE)
- Average class size: 21.1
- Student to teacher ratio: 20.95
- Campus type: Urban
- Colors: Orange; Blue
- Nickname: BAL
- Team name: Buccaneers
- Yearbook: The Galleon
- Website: www.sfusd.edu/school/balboa-high-school

San Francisco Designated Landmark
- Designated: 1995
- Reference no.: 205
- Last updated: October 16, 2026

Balboa High School, colloquially known as Bal, is an American public high school located near the Excelsior District in the Mission Terrace neighborhood of San Francisco, California, United States. Balboa serves grades nine through twelve as part of the San Francisco Unified School District (SFUSD).

Balboa is a comprehensive school located in an urban working class district. It educates a greater proportion of the city's disadvantaged and minority students relative to other city high schools. Mirroring conditions in the areas it serves, the school has a history marked by periods of violence, controversy, and low academic performance.

The school motto is "First on the Pacific". The campus is the only historic landmark school in the district and the only one operating in the city. Following the dismissal of the entire faculty in 1999, it became the first school in northern California to embrace and convert its curriculum to the concept of small learning communities. It was the first in California to start a school-based student health clinic. In response to the AIDS pandemic, it was the first school in California to distribute free condoms to students. In the last decade, Balboa has experienced a turnaround and has improved its reputation and academic performance. The school achieved placement on Newsweek's "America's Top Public High Schools" list in 2007 and 2008.

== History ==
Balboa High School is named for 16th-century Spanish explorer Vasco Núñez de Balboa. Founded in 1928, campus construction was completed in 1931.

In the spring of 1952, students at Balboa invented a variation on a conga line dance which inspired bandleader and songwriter Ray Anthony to compose an accompanying hit song with the same name, "The Bunny Hop".

In 1986, Balboa converted its metal shop into the first school-based health clinic in California: the Balboa Teen Health Center. The clinic provides basic medical and mental health services. The clinic has improved access and the health habits of a disadvantaged student population that might otherwise have no professional health assistance.

In an effort to prevent the spread of AIDS, Balboa became the first school in California to distribute free condoms to students in May 1992. This program and the clinic's other family planning and sexually transmitted disease efforts have featured somewhat controversially in a number of research papers and debates.

Balboa became embroiled in controversy over a hazing incident on February 22, 1994, in which three Junior Reserve Officers' Training Corps (JROTC) cadets were assaulted by other team members under orders from senior commanders and one cadet was rendered partially deaf from a punctured eardrum. The resulting litigation from this incident exposed a culture and history of JROTC hazing at Balboa and several other SFUSD schools extending back to the 1980s. This controversy has been cited by JROTC opponents in efforts to eliminate the program at all SFUSD schools, which lasted from 2007 to 2009.

On August 30, 2018, a firearm was discharged in the little theatre room where a student was playing with it in his backpack. Four students were arrested; two were able to return to school.

=== Academic resurgence ===
In 1996, frustrated by high turnover and low performance on the part of the educational staff, the SFUSD dismissed the entire faculty.

During the 1999–2000 academic year, Balboa shifted its academic program to the concept of Small Learning Communities (SLC). These communities would form a 'school within a school" in an effort to turn around past poor academic performance. To support the formation of SLCs, Balboa was the recipient of funding from the Bill & Melinda Gates Foundation in 2004 and 2005 through the Every Child Can Learn Foundation Secondary Redesign Initiative.

Frustrated by poor conditions such as insufficient textbooks and dilapidated facilities during the late 1990s, students at Balboa became members of the class-action lawsuit Williams v. California. Filed in 2000 by the American Civil Liberties Union (ACLU) against the State of California, the suit alleged a failure to provide adequate facilities, textbooks, and teachers for the poorest schools in the state. The case was named after Eliezer Williams, a middle school student at the time, soon to enter Balboa. The lawsuit was resolved in 2004, with the State of California agreeing to provide $138 million for instructional material, US$50 million for critical facility repairs at nearly 2,400 state schools, and to reimburse school districts for future repairs of deficient facilities. Estimates indicate California may be liable for up to US$1 billion in reimbursements over several years.

Building on an effort started in 2001 to increase scores by providing breakfast before tests, Balboa initiated a pilot breakfast program in 2005 called "Grab N Go." A first for Northern California, the program has increased the number of disadvantaged students receiving breakfast. Using magnetic swipe cards, eligible students can pick up a pre-bagged meal as they enter the building and can eat the meal during the first ten minutes of their first class. Previously, students would have to arrive up to 30 minutes before classes started and finish the meal in the cafeteria. Prior to 2001 participation in the free or reduced fee meal program averaged under 40% of eligible enrollment. Since the pilot program started, breakfast participation has averaged over 55%. The program was credited with increasing academic performance, and received a Victory Against Hunger Award from the Congressional Hunger Center in 2006. Balboa was one of four schools nationwide to receive part of a grant from the got breakfast? campaign in March 2007 to support the program. Balboa has continued to serve subsidized lunch meals in a traditional two-tiered system. The social stratification caused by the separate lunch lines has attracted some criticism and efforts by the district to improve participation by eligible students.

For the spring 2006 administration, 47% of the school's ninth-graders scored "proficient" or above on the statewide standardized English exam, up from 39% from the previous year.

Balboa has reached third-highest rating of high schools in the San Francisco Unified District, next to Ruth Asawa San Francisco School of the Arts a Public School as second, and Lowell High School as first, in accordance to Great Schools Rating of administrators, parents, and fellow students.

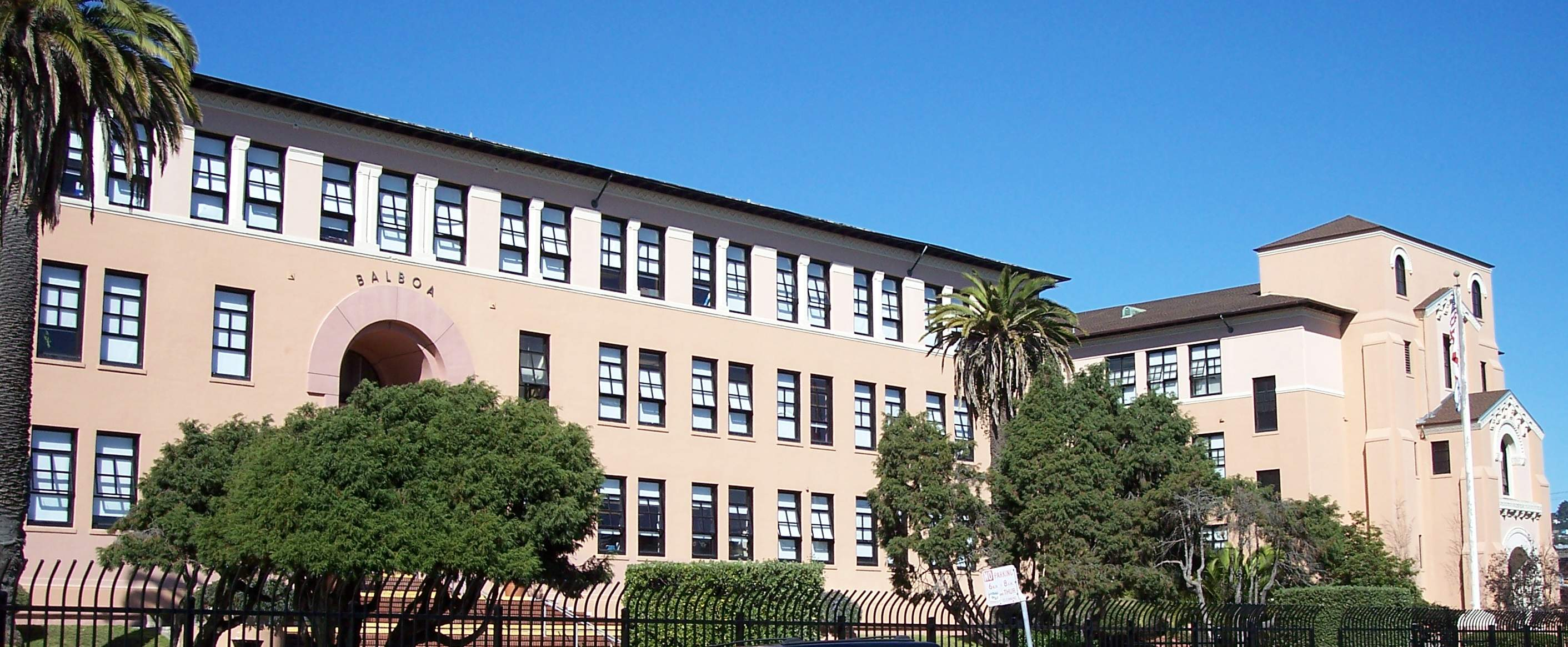
Balboa High School, main classroom building

== Campus ==
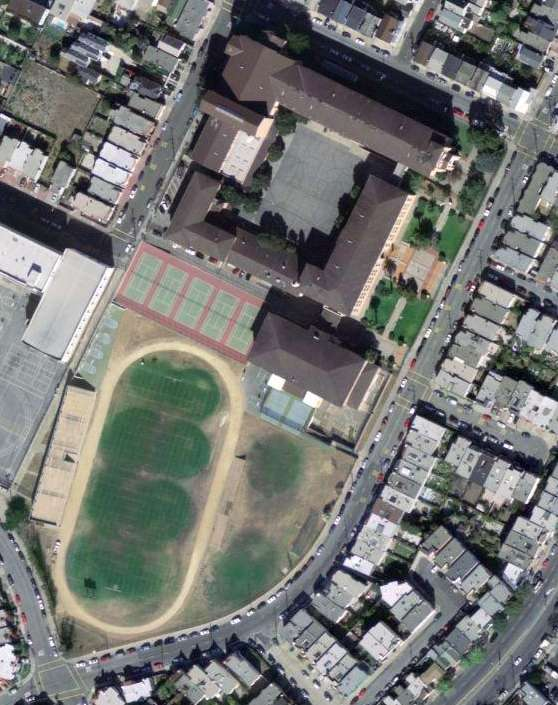
The Balboa High School campus

=== Location ===
The school campus is located a few blocks away from major thoroughfares including Mission Street. The campus is close to Balboa Park, Balboa Park Station, and Interstate 280. San Francisco Municipal Railway transit lines J, K, M, 8, 14, 14R, 29, 43, 49, and 54 provide nearby service.

The Balboa campus is part of a larger SFUSD academic complex that includes neighboring James Denman Middle School and the San Miguel Child Development Center. Balboa is close to City College of San Francisco, the private Lick-Wilmerding High School, and Catholic Archbishop Riordan High School. Situated at the bottom of a valley, parts of the campus are built over a former river and lake.

=== Landmark ===
Balboa is one of two of the only historic landmark schools operating in San Francisco (the second being Mission High School designated with landmark number 250.) The campus became city historic landmark number 205 by proclamation signed on January 20, 1995, by mayor Frank Jordan. Balboa is regarded as one of the better designed and visually engaging schools within the SFUSD. San Francisco architect John Reid Jr. designed the first campus buildings in the Spanish Colonial Revival Style with a prominent center courtyard, mission style roof tiles, and arcades.

Although originally designed with a distinctive red mission tile roof, all campus buildings had their roofs replaced in 1998 with seismically stable materials. An original roof tile is displayed in Balboa's Hall of History.

=== Facilities ===
The main entrance along the eastern side of the campus quadrangle is dominated by the three-story main classroom building. The library building to the north of the quad is equal in height to the main building and houses classrooms adjacent to and above the first floor library, including two computer labs and all the science lab classrooms. Distinct bridges on all three levels connect these two buildings.

Arts and athletic facilities dominate the southern half of the campus. Facilities along this side of the quad include the gymnasium, tennis courts, track, and football field. The main cafeteria and the Teen Health Clinic are housed on the southern side of the quad.

Vocational and cafeteria facilities form the western side of the campus quad. Balboa's auditorium, theater, and music rehearsal rooms also are found on the western side of the campus quad. In 2004, the theater was refurbished with the help of charitable funding from theatrical producer Carole Shorenstein Hays.

In partnership with PG&E, Balboa will be one of seven SFUSD schools to participate in the district's "Solar Schools" program. Solar panels will be installed on the roof to benefit from and raise awareness of alternative energy.

== Demographics ==
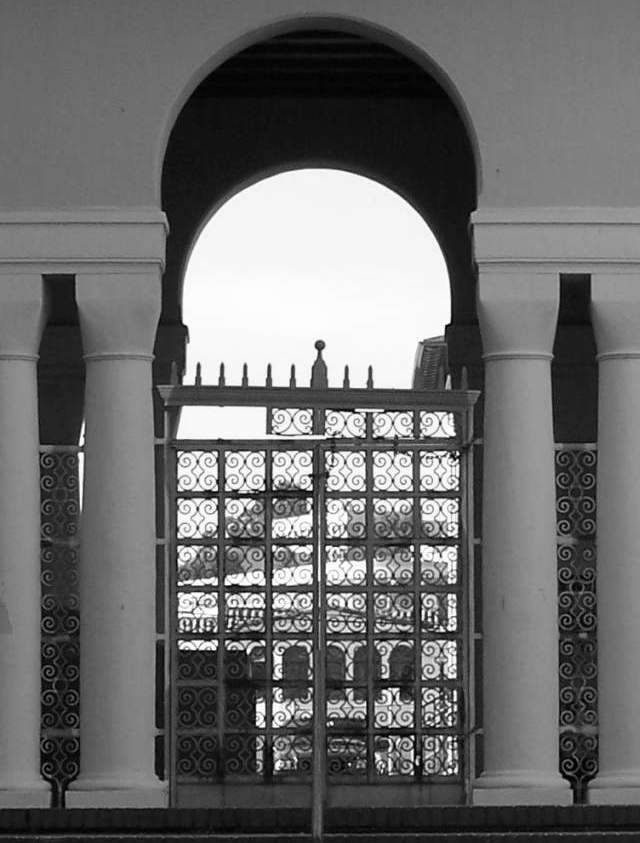
Gymnasium arcade

According to U.S. News & World Report, 94% of Balboa's student body is "of color," with 68% of the student body coming from an economically disadvantaged household, determined by student eligibility for California's Reduced-price meal program.

White	Latino	Asian	African American	Pacific Islander	American Indian	Two or More Races
6%	28%	54%	6%	2%	0.3%	3%

Balboa historically has had a school population of primarily ethnic minorities. Between 1993 and 2010, the White population at Balboa totaled less than 5% of yearly enrollment, but the incoming freshman classes of 2013 and 2014 spiked the white population up to 5.4%. Up to 2003, the predominant ethnic groups at the school alternated between Hispanic (24–30%) and African American (19–24%). During this time Filipino students also figured prominently in the ethnic distribution (19–30%) briefly becoming the majority ethnic group between 1997 and 1999. American Indians have always comprised less than 1%, and Pacific Islanders less than 3% of the school population.

Starting in 2004, the school's increasing academic stature combined with citywide demographic changes attributable to gentrification and policy change radically changed the student demographic at Balboa. Asian students became the predominant ethnic group (34–39%) previously accounting for less than 20% of the school population. Hispanic and Filipino students followed with declining majorities. The largest decline was in the number of African American students, accounting for only 11.3% of the school population through the 2007–2008 school year.

Coinciding with the academic turmoil of the late 1990s, the dropout rate at Balboa experienced a spike of over 230 students (16.8%) leaving in 1998. The year 2000 saw a sharp decline in the dropout rate, with no students leaving that year. The rate has averaged 2–6% since then.

The demographic composition of certified faculty over the last decade has consisted primarily of White teachers (32–54%) with approximately similar distributions of staff reporting Asian (6–15%), Filipino (9–19%), or Hispanic (11–19%) ethnicity. African American staff accounted for the remaining 8–11%. The number of staff over the last decade has averaged between 55 and 91 members.

== Curriculum ==
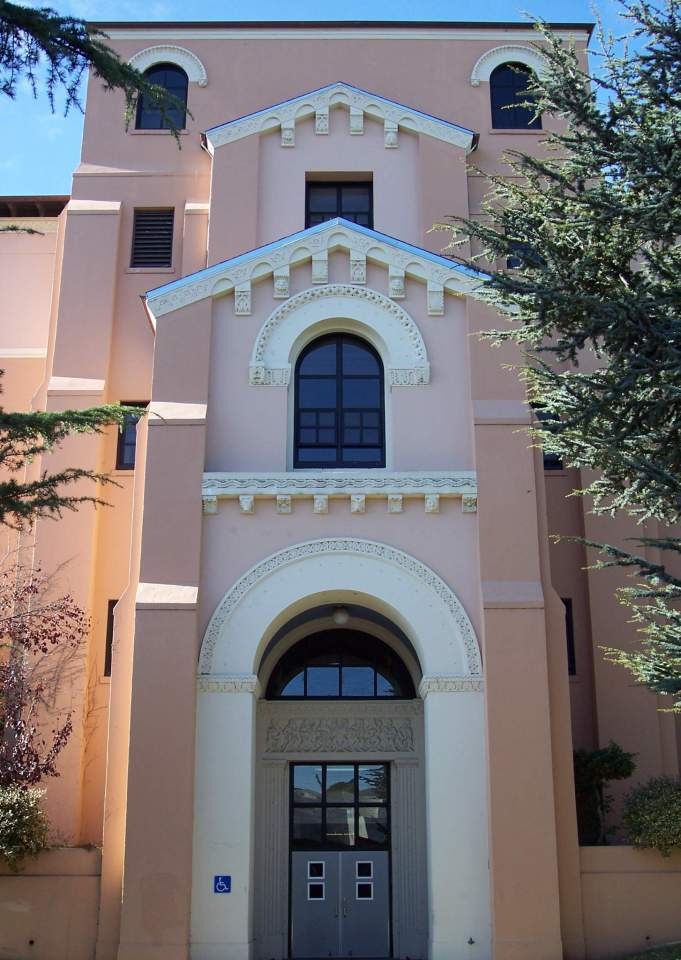
Library building entrance

Balboa participates in the SFUSD's admissions lottery in which students from the entire city can indicate a preference to attend any of the district schools regardless of geographical location. Based on this preference and certain socioeconomic factors, students are then assigned to schools per district policies and goals.

=== Small learning communities ===
Academic instruction at Balboa High School is centered on the concept of SLCs called Pathways. Each community has a thematic focus that encourages individualized learning, an awareness of the future, and personal responsibility. Teachers and students work in a shared thematic collaboration to integrate lessons from their classes. The same sets of students are present in each of the classes, fostering the learning community. Some teachers will follow their students into successive grade levels to enhance continuity.

In their first two years, communities of approximately 60–120 students experience focused core literary and mathematics instruction, with emphasis on community citizenship, and an exploration of career paths. Academies or pathways are chosen by students at the end of the 10th grade for the second half of their school career with the goal of preparation for career and college. A few exceptions are noted below.

Every community or academy has several goals in common. Students are educated in preparation for their future career or post-secondary education. All communities provide the University of California "A-G college prep" coursework necessary for university admissions eligibility. All 11th and 12th grade academies have a common goal of combining coursework with external experiences through field trips, internships, or a mentorship with local business entities or the community at large. These external events are used to raise career awareness. Students in all communities will develop a personal portfolio or résumé. Students will develop skills in research and presentation with the goal of developing collaborative and social skills.

- Game Design Academy (formerly Academy of Information Technology (AoIT)): A two-year academy which develops digital technology skills. Students participate in an electronic mentorship program with professionals in the technology industry and develop a digital portfolio. In collaboration with the Pearson Foundation, AoIT students have developed digital storytelling exercises to learn about historical subjects such as abolitionism.
- LAW: The Law Academy prepares 11th and 12th grade students for college and career with a focus on justice. By encouraging students to challenge and reflect on their coursework in American history, American literature, and Pre-law; students develop an awareness of community and interdependence. Students will build analytical and problem solving skills by identifying a need or issue in a community and addressing it.
- Wilderness Arts and Literacy Collaborative (WALC): A co-curricular academic pathway started in 1998 with the goal of using education in and of the environment to provide an alternative means to learning science, art, technology, math, and literacy. The Sierra Club provided an initial grant as part of a private / public funding initiative to help start the WALC. Sponsored by the Tides Center, students combine wilderness experiences in environmental citizenship such as hiking, habitat restoration, recycling, or gardening with a rigorous classroom curriculum. WALC is offered to 11th and 12th grade students.

== Extracurricular activities ==
=== Athletics ===
The athletic programs at Balboa participate in the San Francisco Section of the California Interscholastic Federation. Female sports teams are fielded in badminton, basketball, cheerleading, cross country, fencing, golf, soccer, softball, tennis, track, swimming, and volleyball. Twelve male sports teams are fielded in baseball, basketball, cross country, fencing, football, golf, soccer, tennis, track, volleyball, swimming and wrestling.

The football team achieved a 111–39–5 record between 1962 and 1977, including six wins of the annual city Turkey Day title game in 1967 (11–0),1968 (9–2),1971 (11–0),1973 (10–0–1),1975 (12–0) and 1976 (10–2), led by coach Archie Chagonjian. From 1967 to 1977, the team won section or season titles 11 times. Beginning in the Fall of 1993 the football program at Balboa went into decline, failing to make it to the Turkey Day playoff until 2004. They lost to Lowell in 2004 but made it back again in 2005, with that year's Samoan team members notably performing a haka dance before going on to lose to Lincoln High.

=== Organizations ===
==== Mock Trial ====
The Mock Trial team is sponsored by a local law firm. The team practices from September to February in preparation for City and County of San Francisco competitions held the last two weeks of February. The champion from this competition advances to the state competition in March. The state champion will then move on to the national competition in May, representing the state of California.

In 2006, it was crowned the champion of the City and County of San Francisco. Despite a 0–2 record in the first rounds, technicalities (a team's win–loss record and point percentages) allowed Balboa to move on to the semi-finals. It was then that the Balboa team defeated The School of the Arts after losing to SOTA previously in the first round. The team then went on to defeat Mission High School in the finals. As the winning team for San Francisco, Balboa went on to represent the county at the state competitions in Riverside, California. In commemoration of this achievement, San Francisco District 11 Supervisor Gerardo Sandoval awarded the Balboa Mock Trial team the title of "District 11 Local Heroes."

==== United Playaz ====
United Playaz Logo

United Playaz is an anti-violence and gang prevention program that seeks to stop the seeds of school violence through collaborative meetings and activities. The program was started in 1994 by former Balboa student turned gang prevention counselor, Rudy Corpuz, in response to racially motivated gang violence between Balboa students. The group is best known for fostering meetings and discussions between the school administration, community, and various adversarial student factions. These efforts were credited with turning the security situation at Balboa around by 1997. The "Playaz" have hosted sports programs, talent shows, and field trips to dissuade at-risk youth from gangs. They provide ways for students to openly discuss and express opinions on issues and tensions which unchecked lead to violence. United Playaz was the subject of an episode on television news magazine California Connected in June 2003.

The United Playaz collaborates with the ROOTS program, a program for students whose parents or family members are incarcerated. ROOTS focuses on interdependence with their peers including the "Playaz."

== Notable people ==
=== Alumni ===
- Herbert Sigüenza (1976), playwright and actor
- McLeod Bethel-Thompson (2006), professional football player
- Dewey Crumpler (1967), artist
- Gary DeLong (1958), former soccer goalkeeper for the United States men's national soccer team
- Juan Eichelberger (1971), former MLB baseball player, San Diego Padres, Cleveland Indians, Atlanta Braves
- Solofa Fatu (1984), WWE Hall of Famer best known as Rikishi
- Jerry Garcia (1959), lead guitarist and vocalist for the Grateful Dead
- Herb Gorman, former MLB baseball player, Saint Louis Cardinals
- Cindy Herron (1979), singer of the contemporary R&B quartet En Vogue, actress best known for her role in Juice
- Calvin Jones (1968), former NFL football cornerback for the Denver Broncos from 1973—1976
- Philip Lamantia (1943), surrealist poet of the Beat Generation
- Windy McCall, former MLB baseball player, Boston Red Sox, Pittsburgh Pirates, New York Giants
- Michael Norris (1972), MLB baseball player, Oakland Athletics
- Richard Quitevis (1987), turntablist best known as DJ QBert
- Brandy Reed (1994), former WNBA basketball player
- Bob Roselli, former MLB baseball player, Milwaukee Braves, Chicago White Sox
- George H. Ruge (1939), radio, television broadcaster and producer; charter member of the Broadcast Legends
- George Marshall Ruge (1969), American filmmaker, film director, actor, writer, stunt coordinator
- Calvin E. Simmons (1972), first African-American conductor of a major U.S. symphony orchestra; former assistant conductor of the Los Angeles Philharmonic and musical director of the Oakland Symphony Orchestra
- Bob Sweeney (1936), actor, director of The Andy Griffith Show, producer for Hawaii Five-O
- Leonard Lake (1964), serial killer
- Raymond Taft (1937, masters swimming coach and medalist, inducted as an International Swimming Hall of Fame honoree
- George Varoff (1932), record setting pole vaulter
- Willie Wise (1965), former basketball player, Denver Nuggets and Seattle SuperSonics; draft pick of the San Francisco Warriors

=== Staff ===
- James Burke, 1964 Olympic wrestler, USA Wrestling Hall of Fame coach
- Lloyd Leith (1931—1936), Basketball Hall of Fame coach and referee
- Kevin Restani (2006—2010), former NBA player

== See also ==
- San Francisco County high schools
- List of San Francisco Designated Landmarks
