= Gray Davis =

Governor of California from 1999 to 2003

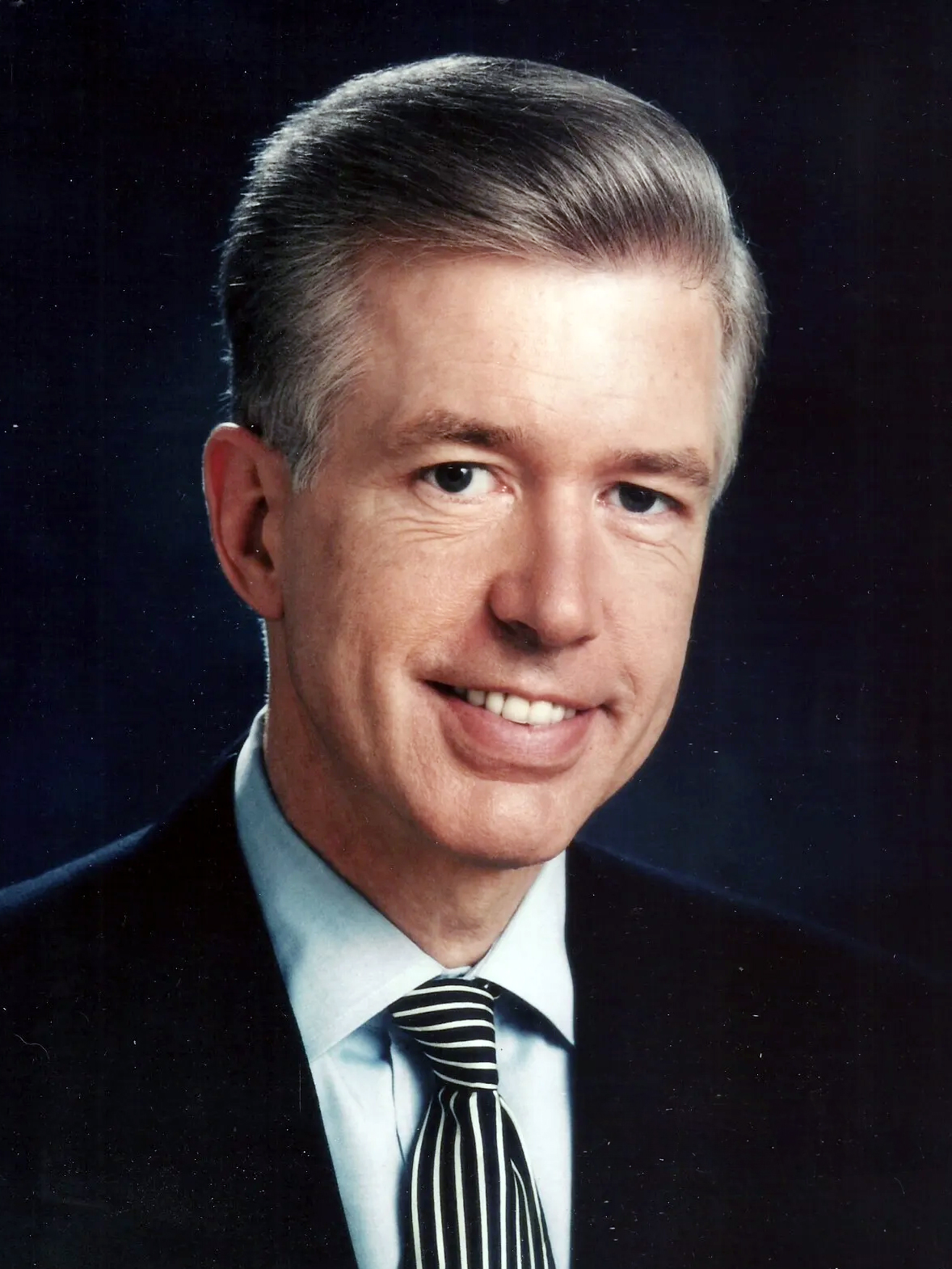
- Official portrait, c. 1999–2003

37th Governor of California
- In office January 4, 1999 – November 17, 2003
- Lieutenant: Cruz Bustamante
- Preceded by: Pete Wilson
- Succeeded by: Arnold Schwarzenegger

44th Lieutenant Governor of California
- In office January 2, 1995 – January 4, 1999
- Governor: Pete Wilson
- Preceded by: Leo T. McCarthy
- Succeeded by: Cruz Bustamante

28th Controller of California
- In office January 5, 1987 – January 2, 1995
- Governor: George Deukmejian; Pete Wilson
- Preceded by: Kenneth Cory
- Succeeded by: Kathleen Connell

Member of the California State Assembly from the 43rd district
- In office December 6, 1982 – November 30, 1986
- Preceded by: Howard Berman
- Succeeded by: Terry B. Friedman

Chief of Staff to the Governor of California
- In office 1975–1981
- Governor: Jerry Brown
- Preceded by: Edwin Meese
- Succeeded by: B. T. Collins

Personal details
- Born: Joseph Graham Davis Jr. December 26, 1942 (age 83) New York City, New York, U.S.
- Party: Democratic
- Spouse: Sharon Ryer (m. 1980)
- Education: Stanford University (BA); Columbia University (JD)

Military service
- Branch/service: United States Army
- Years of service: 1967–1969
- Rank: Captain
- Battles/wars: Vietnam War
- Awards: Bronze Star Medal

Joseph Graham "Gray" Davis Jr. (born December 26, 1942) is an American attorney and former politician who served as the 37th governor of California from 1999 until he was recalled and removed from office in 2003. He is the second state governor in U.S. history to have been recalled, after Lynn Frazier of North Dakota.

A member of the Democratic Party, Davis holds a Bachelor of Arts in history from Stanford University and a Juris Doctor from Columbia Law School. He was awarded a Bronze Star for his service as a captain in the Vietnam War. Prior to serving as governor, Davis was chief of staff to Governor Jerry Brown (1975–1981), a California State Assemblyman (1983–1987), California State Controller (1987–1995) and the 44th lieutenant governor of California (1995–1999).

During his time as governor, California spent eight billion dollars more than was required under Proposition 98 on K-12 education during his first term. Davis faced criticism from civil-rights advocates for his administration’s handling of Williams v. California, a lawsuit alleging that students in under-resourced schools, many in low-income and minority communities, were denied equal educational opportunities. Davis signed the nation's first state law requiring automakers to limit auto emissions. Davis supported laws to ban assault weapons and is also credited with improving relations between California and Mexico. Davis began his tenure as governor with strong approval ratings, but they declined as voters blamed him for the California electricity crisis, the California budget crisis that followed the bursting of the dot-com bubble, and the car tax.

On October 7, 2003, Davis was recalled. In the recall election, 55.4% of voters supported his removal. He was succeeded in office on November 17, 2003, by actor Arnold Schwarzenegger, who won the recall replacement election. After being recalled, Davis worked as a lecturer at the UCLA School of Public Affairs and as an attorney at Loeb & Loeb.

== Early life, education, and military service ==
Davis was born in the Bronx, New York City, on December 26, 1942, the son of Doris (Meyer) Morell and Joseph Graham Davis. Davis was the oldest of five children: Three boys and two girls. Davis's father, an advertising manager at Time Inc. and an alcoholic, was the son of businessman William Rhodes Davis. Davis' upper-middle-class family was led by his demanding mother, who gave him the nickname "Gray". Davis moved to California with his family in 1954.

Davis graduated from a North Hollywood military academy, the Harvard School for Boys (now part of Harvard-Westlake School). His diverse educational experiences at public, private and Catholic schools allowed him an opportunity to compare all three systems as a lawmaker.

Davis's academic accomplishments earned him acceptance to Stanford University. He played on the Stanford golf team with a two handicap. After Davis entered Stanford, his father left the family, forcing Davis to join the ROTC to stay in school; his arrangement with ROTC included a promise to enter the Army after completing his education. In 1964, he graduated with distinction from Stanford, receiving a Bachelor of Arts in history. He then returned to New York City to attend Columbia Law School, graduating with his J.D. degree in 1967.

After completing law school in 1967, Davis entered active duty in the United States Army, serving in the Vietnam War during its height until 1969. Davis saw time on the battlefield during his time in Vietnam. Davis returned home as a captain with a Bronze Star Medal for meritorious service. Friends who knew him at the time said Davis—like many war veterans—came back a changed man, interested in politics and more intense, according to the Sacramento Bee. He returned from Vietnam more "serious and directed." Davis was surprised to discover that many of those serving in Vietnam were Latinos, African Americans and southern whites with very few from schools like Stanford and Columbia; Davis believed that the burden of the war should be felt equally and he resolved early on to go about changing America so that would change. Davis is a life member of the American Legion and the Veterans of Foreign Wars.

== Early career ==
Davis volunteered for John V. Tunney's campaign for the United States Senate in 1970. He started a statewide neighborhood crime watch program while serving as chairman of the California Council on Criminal Justice. His initial political experience included working to help Tom Bradley win election as Los Angeles's first black mayor in 1973. The historical significance of Bradley's victory further inspired Davis to pursue a career in politics. Davis ran for state treasurer in 1974 but lost when the more popular Jesse Unruh filed to run on the deadline.

Davis served as executive secretary and chief of staff to Governor Edmund G. "Jerry" Brown Jr. from 1975 to 1981. Davis was not as liberal as Brown, and some said he offset Brown's style by projecting a more intense, controlled personality. Davis has stated that while Brown was campaigning for president in 1980, Davis ran the state in Brown's absence.

Davis served as the Assemblyman from the 43rd district, representing parts of Los Angeles County including West Los Angeles and Beverly Hills from 1983 to 1987. Davis championed a popular campaign to help find missing children by placing their pictures on milk cartons and grocery bags. Davis's Republican opponent in the race, William Campbell, criticized Davis as "...the man special interests love most." Among other allegations raised by Campbell were disclosures that Davis had received campaign contributions from Eugene LaPietra, a candidate for the West Hollywood City Council who was convicted on federal pornography charges. LaPietra served as Davis’ finance chairman. Davis cut all ties with La Pietra following a Los Angeles Times report on his pornography convictions.

== State Controller ==
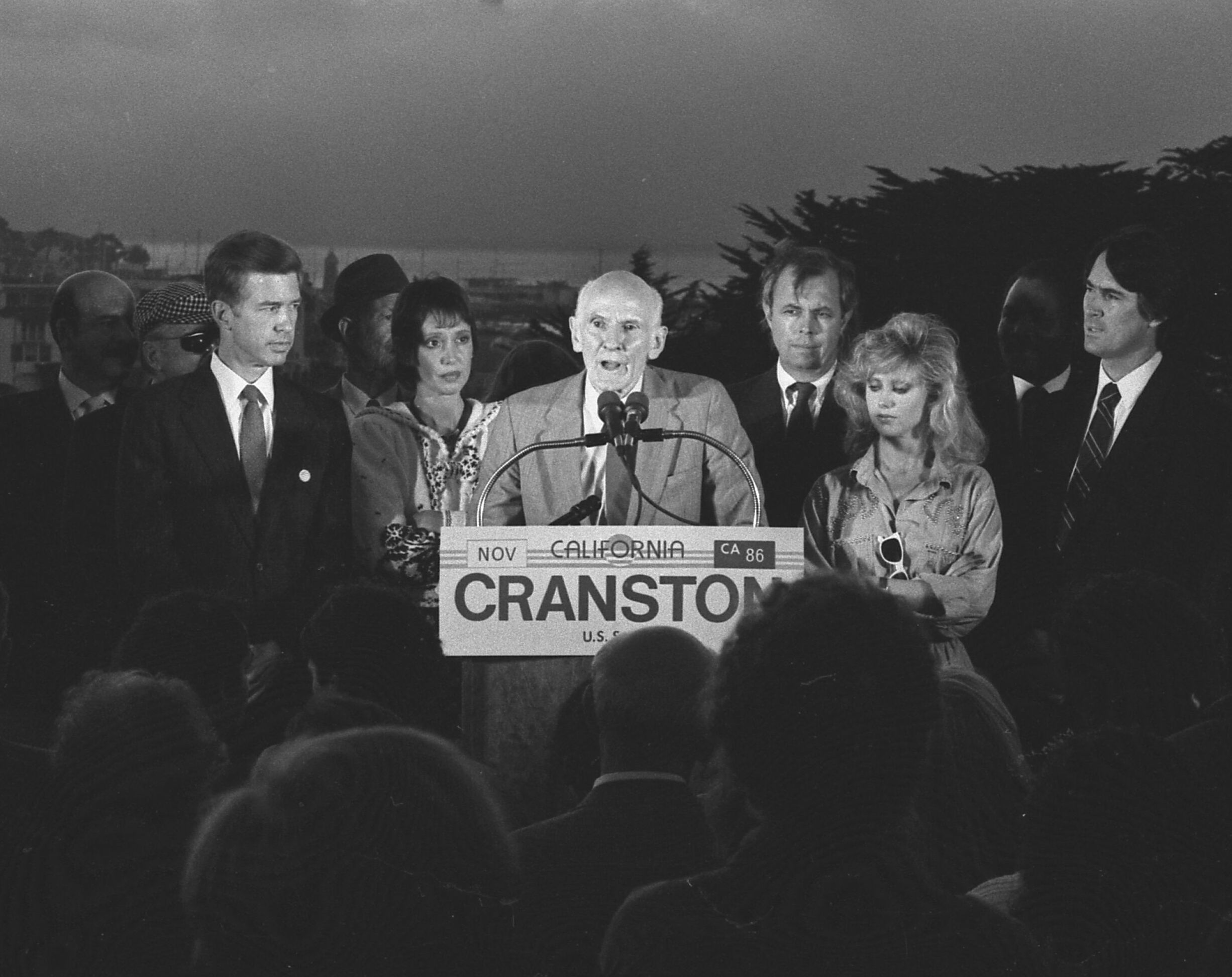
Davis with Shelley Duvall, U.S. Senator Alan Cranston, and Morgan Fairchild in 1986.

In 1986, Davis ran against six other contenders in the race for State Controller; several of those candidates, including Democrat John Garamendi and Republican Bill Campbell, were arguably better known at the time. Davis won the election and served as State Controller for eight years until 1995. As California's chief fiscal officer, he saved taxpayers more than half a billion dollars by cracking down on Medi-Cal fraud, rooting out government waste and inefficiency and exposing the misuse of public funds. He was the first controller to withhold paychecks from all state elected officials, including himself, until the governor and the Legislature passed an overdue budget. He also found and returned more than $1.8 billion in unclaimed property to California citizens, including forgotten bank accounts, insurance settlements and stocks.

== 1992 U.S. Senate campaign ==
Davis ran against San Francisco mayor Dianne Feinstein for the Democratic nomination for the United States Senate in the 1992 special election to fill the Senate seat vacated by Pete Wilson who was elected Governor of California in 1990.

The race is often cited as an example of Davis's history of negative campaign tactics. The Davis campaign featured an ad that compared Feinstein to the incarcerated hotelier Leona Helmsley. Some experts consider that ad to be the most negative in state history. The ad backfired with Davis losing to Feinstein by a significant margin for the nomination, although this loss did not stop Davis from using negative campaign ads in the future, including in his race for lieutenant governor.

Davis blamed his campaign managers for the defeat and vowed not to let major decisions in future campaigns be decided by his campaign staff. In 2003, when Feinstein urged voters to vote no during the recall election, she was constantly reminded through questions, video and the media about the 1992 primary.

== Lieutenant Governor of California ==
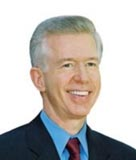
Davis as Lieutenant Governor

Many Democrats came to believe that Davis's political career was over after his defeat in his run for the Senate, but Davis created a new campaign team. He won the race for lieutenant governor in 1994. Davis ran as a moderate candidate against Republican Cathie Wright. Davis used ads to depict Wright as a Republican who was too conservative for California. Davis had a large advantage in campaign funds.

As lieutenant governor until 1999, Gray Davis focused on efforts on the California economy and worked to encourage new industries to locate and expand in the state. He also worked to keep college education affordable for California's middle-class families and oversaw the largest student-fee reduction in California history. As the state's second-highest officeholder, he served as President of the State Senate, Chair of the Commission for Economic Development, Chair of the State Lands Commission, Regent of the University of California and Trustee of the California State University.

== Governor of California ==
=== 1998 gubernatorial campaign ===
In the June primary election, Davis surprised political observers by handily defeating two better funded Democratic opponents: multimillionaire airline executive Al Checchi and Congresswoman Jane Harman, wife of multimillionaire Sidney Harman. Davis's campaign slogan during the primary was "Experience Money Can't Buy." Early primary polls showed Davis in third for the Democratic nomination. Davis surprised many political insiders with his landslide come-from-behind victory. Davis even finished ahead of the unopposed Republican nominee in California's first blanket gubernatorial primary.

Davis won the 1998 general election for governor with 57.9% of the vote, defeating Republican Attorney General Dan Lungren who had 38.4%. Davis aimed to portray himself as a moderate centrist Democrat and to label Lungren a Republican too conservative for California and out of touch with its views on issues like guns and abortion. After his victory, Davis declared that he would work to end the "divisive politics" of his predecessor Pete Wilson. In his campaign, Davis emphasized the need to improve California's public schools, which voters had cited as their top concern in this election.

=== First term ===
==== Popular start and education ====
In 1998, Davis was elected the Golden State's first Democratic governor in 16 years. The San Jose Mercury News called him "perhaps the best-trained governor-in-waiting California has ever produced." In March 1999, Davis enjoyed a 58% approval rating and just 12% disapproval. His numbers peaked in February 2000 with 62% approval and 20% disapproval, coinciding with the peak of the dot-com boom in California. Davis held his strong poll numbers into January 2001.

Davis's first official act as governor was to call a special session of the state legislature to address his plan for all California children to be able to read by age 9.

"I ran for governor because of my passion for education," Davis told CNN the Sunday night before the recall election on Larry King Live.

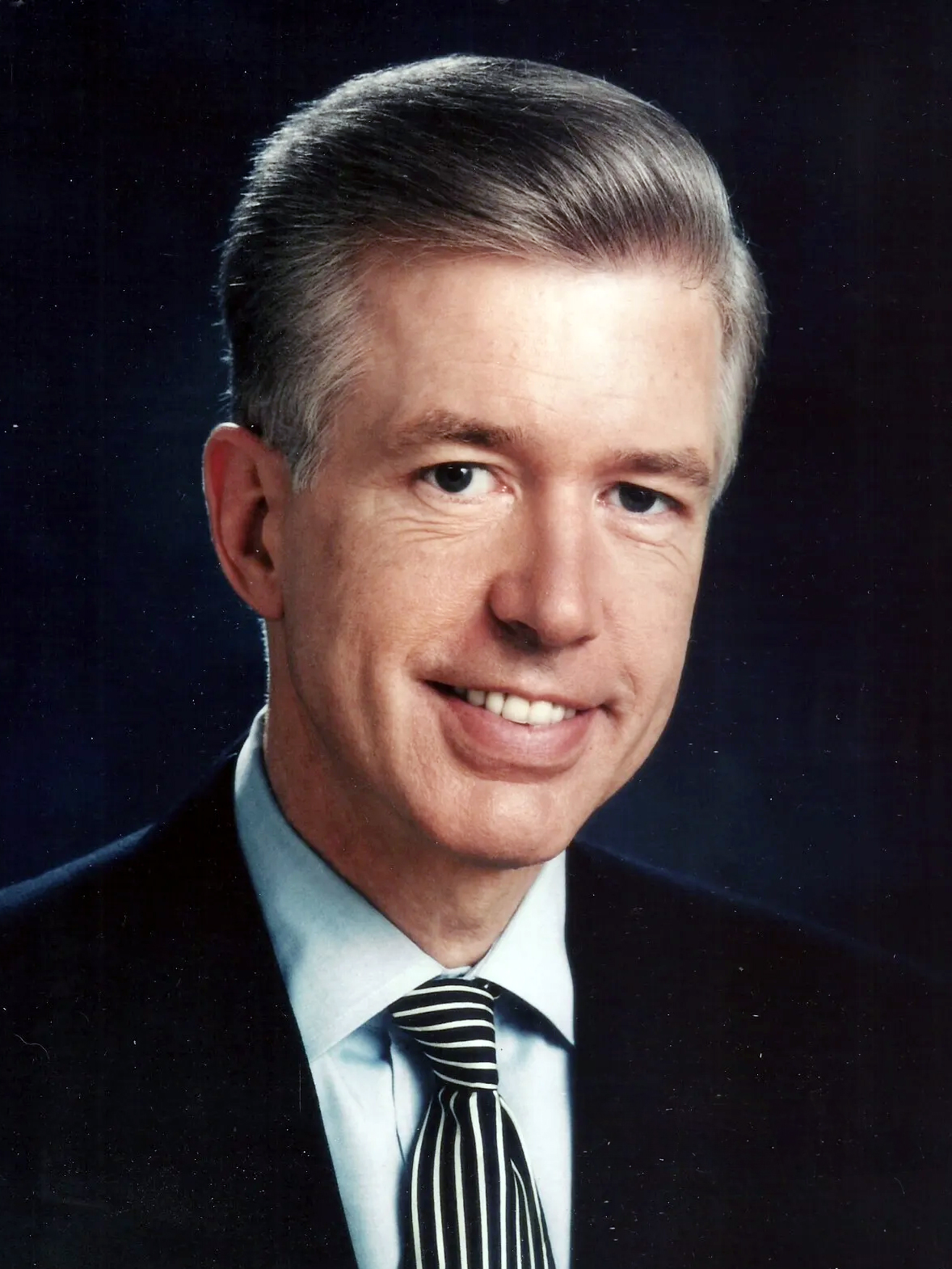
Davis's official photo portrait as governor

Davis used California's growing budget surplus to increase education spending. He signed legislation that provided for a new statewide accountability program and for the Academic Performance Index and supported the high school exit exam. He signed legislation that authorized the largest expansion of the Cal Grant program. Under the Davis administration, California began recognizing students for outstanding academic achievement in math and sciences on the new Golden State Exams. Davis's Governors Scholarship program provided $1,000 scholarships to those students who scored in the top 1% in two subject areas on the state's annual statewide standardized test.

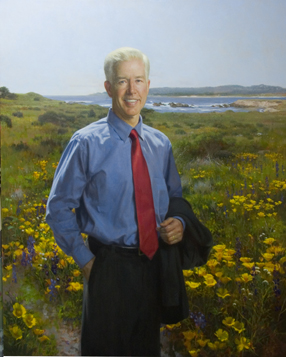
Official state portrait

Davis signed into law legislation that began the Eligibility in the Local Context (ELC) program that guaranteed admission to a University of California institution to students that finished in the top 4% of their high school class. Public schools received $8 billion over the minimum required by Proposition 98 during Davis's first term. Davis increased spending on recruiting more and better-qualified teachers. He campaigned to lower the approval threshold for local school bonds from two-thirds to 55 percent in a statewide proposition that passed. Davis earmarked $3 billion over four years for new textbooks and, between 1999 and 2004, increased state per-pupil spending from $5,756 to $6,922.

In May 2000, a coalition of civil-rights groups filed Williams v. California, alleging that the state’s failure to ensure basic and decent educational necessities—qualified and credentialed teachers, current textbooks, clean and safe facilities and classrooms, decent schools—violated the state constitution’s guarantee of a free and equal public education; plaintiffs emphasized that the worst conditions were concentrated in schools serving low-income and nonwhite students.

Rather than pursue a negotiated settlement, Davis retained the private law firm O’Melveny & Myers to defend the state; by September 2001 the firm had been paid $2.5 million, and its lawyers drew criticism for deposing student plaintiffs—including children as young as eight—about their school conditions.

Davis’s legal strategy also included cross-complaints against the school districts attended by the student plaintiffs, a move criticized at the time as the state “suing itself” and potentially diverting tens of millions of dollars from repairs and instruction into litigation; in the same litigation, San Francisco Superior Court Judge Peter Busch ruled that delegating duties to districts “does not absolve the state of its ultimate responsibility.”

In 2001, Gov. Gray Davis signed Senate Bill 19, which establishes nutritional standards for food at elementary schools and bans the sale of carbonated beverages in elementary and middle schools.

Another early act of Davis's was the reversal of his predecessor Republican Governor Pete Wilson's alteration of California's eight-hour overtime pay rule for wage earners.

==== Signing SB 400 into law ====
In 1999, the CalPERS board proposed a benefits expansion that would allow public employees to retire at age 55 and collect more than half their highest salary for life (pension spiking). CalPERS predicted the benefits would require no increase in the State's contributions by projecting an average annual return of 8.25% over the next decade. When Board member Phil Angelides' aide questioned whether the stock market could grow that long, Board Chairman William Crist, a former union president, replied that they "could make all sorts of different assumptions and make predictions, but that's really more than I think we can expect our staff to do." CalPERS' chief actuary, objected, finding that it would be "fairly catastrophic" if the fund only grew at 4.4%. The benefits expansion bill, SB 400, passed with unanimous backing by California State Assembly Democrats and was signed into law by Governor Gray Davis. CalPERS then produced a video promoting the legislation with Chairman Crist promising greater benefits "without imposing any additional cost on the taxpayers" and the California State Employees Association president praising it as "the biggest thing since sliced bread". The next year the dot-com bubble burst, and CalPERS did not grow, instead losing value in the stock market downturn of 2002. In 2001–2002, CalPERS provided technical assistance for the Sarbanes-Oxley Act because it had sustained financial losses from the Enron and WorldCom bankruptcies. After the Great Recession, in 2009 CalPERS investments lost 24%, dropping $67 billion in value. Chairman Crist retired from the board and it was later revealed he had accepted more than $800,000 from a firm to ensure hundreds of millions of investment from CalPERS.

==== Domestic partnerships ====
Davis recognized the domestic partnerships registry in 1999 and, in 2001, gave same-sex partners a few of the rights enjoyed by opposite-sex spouses such as making health care decisions for an incapacitated partner, acting as a conservator and inheriting property. He also signed a bill to prevent disqualification from a jury based on sexual orientation. Additionally, he signed a bill allowing employees to use family leave to care for a domestic partner, though he did not make good on a campaign promise to convene a task force on civil unions.

==== Guns and public safety ====
He signed laws in 1999 banning assault weapons by characteristic rather than brand name, as well as limiting handgun purchases to one a month, requiring trigger locks with all sales of new firearms and reducing the sale of cheap handguns. Davis's ban included a ban on .50 caliber firearms and so-called "Saturday Night Specials." In 2001, Davis signed a bill requiring gun buyers to pass a safety test.

==== Crime ====
A supporter of the death penalty and tougher sentencing laws, Davis blocked nearly all parole recommendations by the parole board. Davis campaigned as an ardent supporter of capital punishment; which reportedly played a crucial part in his successful gubernatorial campaign. In 1999, he denied his first clemency request from Thai national Jaturun Siripongs, stating, "Model behavior cannot bring back the lives of the two innocent murder victims." Siripongs was executed in February 1999; the first execution to occur during Davis's governorship.

==== Relations with Mexico ====
Early in 1999, Davis sought to improve relations with Mexico. Davis believed that California under Pete Wilson had left millions of dollars of potential trade revenues "on the table." Davis said he wanted California to have relations with Mexico that were more like Texas under then-Governor George W. Bush. Controversy over the California-Mexico border and California Proposition 187 had strained the relationship between the two parties. Davis met with Mexican President Ernesto Zedillo to improve relations with California's southern neighbor and major trading partner within Davis's first 30 days in office. Davis later met with President Vicente Fox and participated in his inauguration. The Governor met with Mexican presidents eight times. Under the Davis administration, California and Baja California signed a "Memorandum of Understanding" expanding cooperation in several policy areas. Under Davis, Mexico became California's leading export market for the first time in history and California's trade with Mexico surpassed all of Mexico's trade with Latin America, Europe and Asia combined. Because of the growth in the California economy, Davis opened and expanded trade offices around the world, including in Mexico. But most of these offices were eliminated in the 2003 California budget due to difficult fiscal times.

==== Health, environment, business, and transportation ====
Davis significantly expanded the number of low-income children with state-subsidized health coverage. He signed laws to allow patients to get a second opinion if their HMO denies treatment and, in limited cases, the right to sue. Davis signed legislation that provided HMO patients a bill of rights, including a help-line to resolve disputes and independent medical review of claims. Under Davis, staff-to-patient ratios in nursing homes improved. However, Davis reneged on a campaign promise to expand low-cost healthcare to parents of needy children due to budget constraints.

Davis allowed non-disabled low-income people with HIV to be treated under Medi-Cal. He signed a law allowing people participating in needle exchange programs to be immune from criminal prosecution. He also increased state spending on AIDS prevention.

Under Governor Davis, California's anti-tobacco campaign became one of the largest and most effective in the nation. R. J. Reynolds and Lorillard Tobacco sued over California's antismoking campaign but their lawsuit was dismissed in July 2003. Davis also authorized a new hard-hitting anti-smoking ad that graphically depicts the damage caused by secondhand smoke.

In September 2002, Governor Davis signed bills to ensure age verification was obtained for cigarettes and other tobacco products sold over the Internet or through the mail, ensured that all state taxes are being fully paid on tobacco purchases and increased the penalty for possessing or purchasing untaxed cigarettes. He also signed legislation to expand smoke-free zones around public buildings.

Davis approved legislation creating a telemarketing do-not-call list in 2003. Under Davis, benefits for injured and unemployed workers increased. The minimum wage increased by $1 to $6.75. Davis backed higher research and development tax credits. He pushed for elimination of the minimum franchise tax paid by new businesses during the first two years of operation.

While Davis's record is generally considered pro-environmental due to increases in spending for land acquisition, maintenance of the state's park system, signing legislation that attempts to cut greenhouse gas emissions by having automakers produce more efficient vehicles, cutting fees to state parks and opposing offshore drilling, he was criticized for not backing tougher restrictions on timber companies as some environmentalists desired. Under the Davis administration, California purchased 10,000 acres (40 km^{2}) for urban parks.

Davis signed the first state law in the US in July 2002 to require automakers to limit auto emissions. The law required the California Air Resources Board to obtain the "maximum feasible" cuts in greenhouse gases emitted by all non-commercial vehicles in 2009 and beyond. Automakers claimed the law would lead smaller and more expensive cars to be sold in California. In 2003, Davis signed legislation aiming to ban junk email.

On March 25, 1999, Davis issued an executive order calling for the removal of MTBE (a toxic gasoline additive) from gasoline sold in the state. In 2001, in order for gas prices to remain reasonable in California while removing MTBE, Davis asked President George W. Bush to order the EPA to grant California a waiver on the federal minimum oxygen requirement. Without a waiver, California would have to import a much larger amount of ethanol per year and gas prices were projected to increase drastically. Bush did not grant the waiver and in 2002, Davis issued an executive order reversing his earlier executive order.

Davis's actions when it came to regulating business suggested that Davis was a more moderate governor. He worked to kill a comprehensive bill opposed by banks and insurance companies to protect consumers' personal financial information. "What you saw in the campaign was what you got," said UC Berkeley professor Bruce Cain. "He's tried to negotiate a course between the different interest groups and keep Democrats on a more centrist, business-oriented track".

Davis approved $5.3 billion over five years for more than 150 transit and highway projects. One of those projects was construction on the new eastern section of the Bay Bridge. During 1999 and 2000, California spent millions on onetime projects like buying new rail cars and track improvements.

==== California electricity crisis ====
Soon after taking office, Davis was able to fast-track the first power plant construction in twelve years in April 1999, although the plant did not come on line before the electricity crisis.

According to the subsequent Federal Energy Regulatory Commission's investigation and report, numerous energy trading companies, many based in Texas, such as Enron Corporation, illegally restricted their supply to the point where the spikes in power usage would cause blackouts. Rolling blackouts affecting 97,000 customers hit the San Francisco Bay area on June 14, 2000, and San Diego Gas & Electric Company filed a complaint alleging market manipulation by some energy producers in August 2000. On December 7, 2000, suffering from low supply and idled power plants, the California Independent System Operator (CAISO), which manages the California power grid, declared the first statewide Stage 3 power alert, meaning power reserves were below 3 percent. Rolling blackouts were avoided when the state halted two large state and federal water pumps to conserve electricity.

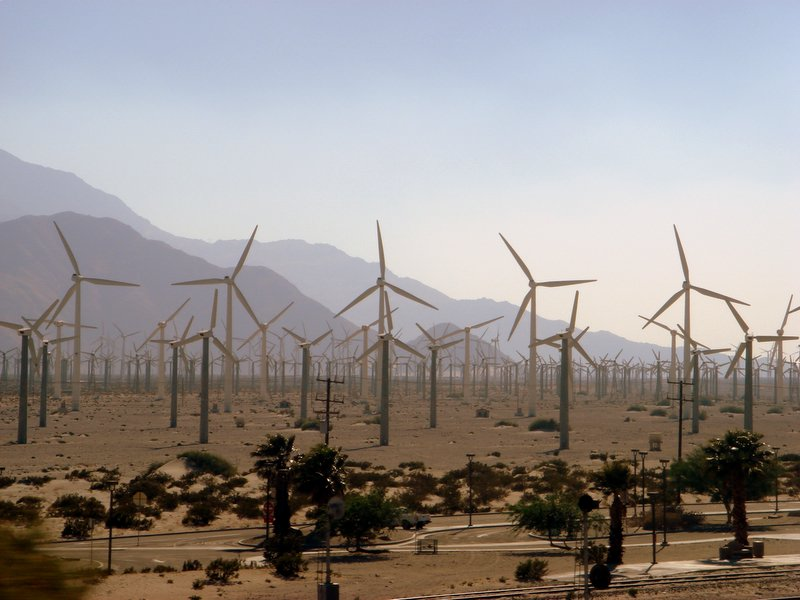
Windmill field outside Palm Springs. Hot temperatures were thought to be pushing California to rolling blackouts, though it was later discovered that market manipulation was the cause.

On January 17, 2001, Davis declared a state of emergency in response to the electricity crisis. Speculators, led by Enron Corporation, were collectively making large profits while the state teetered on the edge for weeks and finally suffered rolling blackouts on January 17 and 18. Davis stepped in to buy power at highly unfavorable terms on the open market, since the California power companies were technically bankrupt and had no buying power. California agreed to pay $43 billion for power over the next 20 years. Newspaper publishers sued Davis to force him to make public the details of the energy deal.

During the electricity crisis, the Davis administration implemented a power conservation program that included television ads and financial incentives to reduce energy consumption. These efforts, the fear of rolling blackouts and the increased cost of electricity resulted in a 14.1% reduction in electricity usage from June 2000 to June 2001.

Gray Davis critics often charge that he did not respond properly to the crisis, while his defenders attribute the crisis solely to the corporate accounting scandals and say that Davis did all he could. Some critics on the left, such as Arianna Huffington, alleged that Davis was lulled to inaction by campaign contributions from energy producers. Some of Davis's energy advisers were formerly employed by the same energy speculators who made millions from the crisis. In addition, the Democratic-controlled legislature would sometimes push Davis to act decisively by taking over power plants which were known to have been gamed and place them back under control of the utilities. Some conservatives argued that Davis signed overpriced energy contracts, employed incompetent negotiators and refused to allow electricity prices to rise for residences statewide much as they had in San Diego, which they argue could have given Davis more leverage against the energy traders and encouraged more conservation. The electricity crisis is considered one of the major factors that led to Davis's recall.

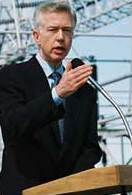
Davis giving a speech on energy

In a speech at UCLA on August 19, 2003, Davis apologized for being slow to act during the energy crisis, but then forcefully attacked the Houston-based energy suppliers: "I inherited the energy deregulation scheme which put us all at the mercy of the big energy producers. We got no help from the Federal government. In fact, when I was fighting Enron and the other energy companies, these same companies were sitting down with Vice President Cheney to draft a national energy strategy."

When the Enron verdicts were rendered years later, convicting Enron and other companies of market manipulation, Davis responded with the following quote:

Ken Lay and Jeffrey Skilling, more than anyone, are the reason I'm talking to you now from this law firm.

(Skilling's conviction was later overturned by the United States Supreme Court in its narrowing of the "honest services" statute.)

On November 13, 2003, shortly before leaving office, Davis officially brought the energy crisis to an end by issuing a proclamation ending the state of emergency he declared on January 17, 2001. The state of emergency allowed the state to buy electricity for the financially strapped utility companies. The emergency authority allowed Davis to order the California Energy Commission to streamline the application process for new power plants. During that time, California issued licenses to 38 new power plants, amounting to 14,365 megawatts of electricity production when completed.

In 2006, the Los Angeles Times published an article that credited Davis's signing of the long-term projects for preventing future blackouts and providing California a cheap supply of energy with the increasing costs of energy.

In March 2003, the Federal Energy Regulatory Commission's long-awaited report on the so-called "energy crisis" was released. That report substantially vindicated Davis, laying the blame for the energy disruption and raiding of California's treasury on deliberate tactics employed by some 25 energy trading companies, most of which were based in Texas. Of the latter, the most notable was Enron, a number of whose principals were subsequently criminally prosecuted for their roles.

==== Budget crisis ====
During the economic boom years of the Davis administration, the California budget expanded to cover Davis's new programs. California's low national K-12 education rankings and Davis's campaign pledge to help education, along with the large majority that elected Davis to his first term and his early popularity, suggest that a majority of Californians supported increases in education spending during the early part of his first term when California was in budget surplus. Polls also showed that increased spending in education was supported by the California voters. Under the Davis administration, taxes were cut by over $5.1 billion that included a $3.5 billion cut in sales tax and a reduction in the vehicle licensing fees. The cut in sales taxes was mandated due to a 1991 law that required sales taxes to be reduced a quarter percent when budget reserves exceed 4 percent of the state general fund for two straight fiscal years which they did in 1999 and 2000. Davis also vetoed $5.1 billion in appropriations during that span.

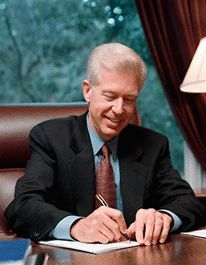
Davis signing the 2000-2001 state budget. The 2002-2003 and 2003-2004 budgets would prove much more difficult to balance with a dramatic drop in state revenue.

While California's economy was expanding, California was producing record budget surpluses under Davis even after his tax cuts and new spending. According to the California Department of Finance, California, had a 10% surplus at the end of 1999 and California was projected to have a 4% surplus at the end fiscal year 2000. These surplus monies were left in the treasury. Davis claimed to be cautious with state finances.

"I'm trying to chart a prudent course and keep us somewhere in the middle. I don't want to jump the gun on spending; I don't want to jump the gun on tax relief," said Davis concerning the budget surpluses on October 26, 2000.

The dot-com boom that had been fueling California's record tax revenues went bust. California was home to a large number of high tech firms and was largely dependent on state income taxes. State revenues fell while ongoing spending commitments created deficits. Restoring the vehicle licensing fees to pre tax cut levels to close the budget gap and stabilize the state's credit rating became unpopular. The beginning shortfall for the 2002-2003 state budget was $23.6 billion. Davis announced that the 2003-2004 budget shortfall would be $34.6 billion while the Legislative Analyst projected a $21.1.

==== Relationship with legislature ====
Davis, a moderate, had some disagreements with the more liberal Democratic-controlled Legislature. Democrat John L. Burton, the leader of the California State Senate, was Davis's chief antagonist.

==== Declining popularity ====
In May 2001, in the middle of the California electricity crisis, his numbers declined to 42% approval and 49% disapproval. By December 2001, Davis's approval ratings spiked up to 51%. His numbers declined back to the May 2001 level and remained about the same over the next year. In April 2003, Davis had a 24% approval rating and 65% disapproval rating. The leading causes of Davis's steep decline in popularity (and eventual recall) were the California electricity crisis, which involved a sharp increase in electricity rates and a series of blackouts in 2001, as well as voter discontent with an increase in state car registration taxes.

Davis had tried to maintain a middle-of-the-road approach, but ultimately alienated many of the state's liberals who viewed him as too conservative and many conservatives who viewed him as too liberal. Many were upset that in trying to balance the budget, Davis cut spending for schools while increasing spending for prisons. Some critics attributed the proposal to the California Correctional Peace Officers Associations donations to Davis's re-election campaign.

=== 2002 gubernatorial campaign ===
Davis began fundraising for his 2002 reelection campaign early in his governorship. Davis raised $13.2 million in 1999 and $14.2 million in 2000, both unprecedented sums at the time so early in an elected term. Davis's 1999 and 2000 contributions included contributions from Pacific Gas & Electric and Edison International. Davis also received large contributions from labor groups, environmental groups and individuals.

Davis's fundraising efforts attracted much attention. University of California Berkeley's Institute of Government Studies claimed that Davis's fundraising skills were "second to none in the political arena" while Senator John McCain called Davis's 2001 goal of $26 million "disgraceful." One article in the San Francisco Chronicle claimed that Davis was raising $34,000 a day. Although Davis's fundraising pace was criticized by his many detractors, Arnold Schwarzenegger would later collect contributions at a quicker rate during the early years of his governorship. Arnoldwatch.org, a project of the Foundation for Taxpayer and Consumer Rights, which is a nonpartisan organization that is critical of both Democrats and Republicans, called Davis a "pay to play" politician and a "sellout".

During the 2002 election campaign, Davis took the unusual step of taking out campaign ads during the Republican primaries against Los Angeles mayor Richard Riordan. Davis claimed that Riordan had attacked his record and that his campaign was defending his record. Polls showed that, as a moderate, Riordan would be a more formidable challenger in the general election than a conservative candidate. Polls even showed that Riordan would defeat Davis. Davis attacked Riordian with negative ads in the primary. The ads questioned Riordan's pro-choice stance by questioning Riordan's support of pro-life politicians and judges. The ads pointed out Riordan's position of wanting a moratorium on the death penalty as being to the left of Gray Davis, who strongly supported it.

Davis's negative ads against Riordan and a variety of other equally important factors explained on the 2002 election page, led to Riordan's defeat in the Republican primary by the more staunchly conservative candidate Bill Simon. In the first 10 weeks of 2002, Davis spent $10 million on ads: $3 million on positive ads boasting of his record, $7 million on negative ads against Riordan.

Davis was re-elected in the November 2002 general election following a long and bitter campaign against Simon, marked by accusations of ethical lapses on both sides and widespread voter apathy. Simon was also hurt by a financial fraud scandal that tarnished Simon's reputation. Davis's campaign touted California's improving test scores, environmental protection, health insurance coverage for children and lower prescription drug costs for seniors. Davis's campaign featured several negative ads that highlighted Simon's financial fraud scandal. The 2002 gubernatorial race was the most expensive in California state history with over $100 million spent. Davis's campaign was better financed; Davis had over $26 million more in campaign reserves than Simon in August 2002. Davis gained re-election with 47.4% of the vote to Simon's 42.4%. However, the Simon-Davis race led in the lowest turnout percentage in modern gubernatorial history, allowing a lower than normal number of signatures required for a recall. Davis won the election, but the majority of voters disliked Davis and did not approve of his job performance.

=== Second term ===
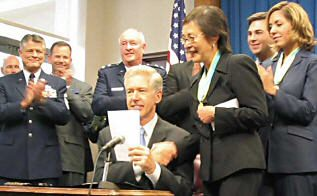
Davis signs AB 574 on September 11, 2003, establishing a student loan repayment program for members of the State Military Forces.

Davis's second term, which lasted only ten months, was dominated by the recall election. He was widely criticized for responding to the budget crisis by reversing a decade of fee reductions on motor vehicles, a decision which his opponents repeatedly referenced. Not long after Davis signed a law allowing the Department of Motor Vehicles to grant driver's licenses to undocumented immigrants, he was challenged to a recall election. Davis had also signed legislation requiring employers to pay for medical insurance for workers and legislation granting domestic partners many of the same rights as married people, and vetoed legislation that would have given undocumented immigrants free tuition for community college. Some political observers saw these efforts as an attempt to reinforce support from Hispanics, labor union members and liberal Democrats. Ultimately, Davis did not have as much support from Hispanics and union members in the recall election as he did in his 2002 re-election.

During his second term, Davis's administration also faced sharp criticism for approving a controversial $95 million software contract with Oracle Corp. and a Northrop Grumman subsidiary, a deal widely viewed as fiscally imprudent and poorly managed. Aileen Adams, then secretary of consumer affairs, testified that she had not been aware of or heard any concerns raised by the Department of Finance about the Oracle contract, stating that had she known of their objections, she would have “headed in a different direction.”

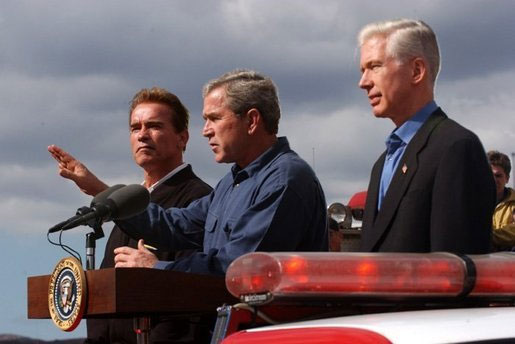
Governor-elect Arnold Schwarzenegger, President George W. Bush and Governor Gray Davis speak to firefighters on November 4, 2003.

Davis was governor during the southern California fires of 2003, more commonly known as the Cedar Fire. Davis declared a state of emergency in Los Angeles County, San Bernardino County, San Diego County and Ventura County in October 2003 and deployed the National Guard to help with disaster relief. By mid-November, the greater South Los Angeles area had been declared a disaster area. This enabled federal funding to help repair flooding and weather-related damage, including the destruction of thousands of acres of vegetation. The Cedar Fire was the last major event during Davis's tenure as governor. Both Davis and governor-elect Schwarzenegger worked to help with disaster relief. Schwarzenegger went to Washington, D.C., and met Vice President Dick Cheney to lobby the federal government for more disaster relief funds.

Davis spent 1,778 days as governor and signed 5,132 bills out of 6,244, vetoing 1,112 bills.

=== Recall election ===
In July 2003, a sufficient number of citizen signatures were collected for a recall election. The initial drive for the recall was fueled by funds from the personal fortune of U.S. Rep. Darrell Issa, a Republican who originally hoped to replace Davis himself. The 2003 California recall special election was the goal of the "Dump Davis" campaign and constituted the first gubernatorial recall in Californian history and only the second in U.S. history. Later, the unsuccessful recall of Scott Walker of Wisconsin in 2012 would be the third, and the 2021 California gubernatorial recall election of Gavin Newsom would be the fourth in September 2021.

Early in the run-up to the recall election, Davis called the recall election an "insult" to the eight million voters who had voted in the 2002 gubernatorial election. The Davis campaign tried to run against the recall Yes/No vote instead of against the candidates who were trying to replace him. Davis tried to depict the recall as a $66 million waste of money that could allow a candidate with a very small percentage of the vote to become Governor—potentially someone who was very liberal or conservative as there are no primaries in a recall election. Davis tried to run "outside the recall circus" and to make himself appear gubernatorial and hard at work for California, and who had made improvements to education and healthcare. Early August polls showed that over 50% supported the recall.

In September 2003, Davis conceded that he had lost touch with the voters and added that he was holding numerous town hall meetings in an effort to address the problem. Poll numbers in September showed a 3% drop in the number of California voters who were planning to vote yes on the recall. According to some analysts and campaign aides, Davis's town hall meetings and conversations with voters were softening his image. Many political insiders remarked that Davis had made several comebacks and that he should not be counted out of the race despite poll numbers that showed over 50% planning to vote yes on the recall.

Headlines of Gray Davis's defeat in UC Berkeley's newspaper, the Daily Californian. The paper's headlines read "Davis Terminated", a reference to one of the governor-elect Arnold Schwarzenegger's movie characters, The Terminator.

During the recall, Davis blamed some of the state's problems on his predecessor, Pete Wilson. Davis claimed that he would have rather raised taxes on the upper tax brackets instead of restoring vehicle registration fees and college student tuition.

Davis called the recall a right-wing effort to rewrite history after having lost the election during the previous year. In a 19-minute campaign address that was broadcast statewide, Davis called the recall effort a "right-wing power grab" by Republicans. He blamed Republicans in the legislature and in Washington for many of the state's problems, while accepting some responsibility for those problems.

"It's like the Oakland Raiders saying to Tampa Bay, 'We know you beat us, but we want to play the Super Bowl again,'" said Davis about the recall.

On October 7, 2003, Davis was recalled. The recall was supported by 55.4% of voters. Republican Arnold Schwarzenegger was elected to replace Davis as governor. The Bay Area and Los Angeles County were the only regions in California to vote "no" on the recall. Davis is the second governor in the history of the United States to have been recalled; the first was Lynn Frazier of North Dakota in 1921.

On the night of the recall, Davis conceded defeat and thanked California for having elected him in five statewide elections. Davis mentioned what he defined as the accomplishments of his administration, such as improvements in education, environmental protection, and health insurance for children. Davis said he would help Schwarzenegger in the transition and he later urged his staff to do the same. His last day in office was November 17, 2003.

== Life after politics ==
Davis attending the 2012 Democratic National Convention

Davis participating in a public service announcement as part of the State of California's "Your Action Saves Lives" series promoting facemasks during the COVID-19 pandemic in 2020.

In December 2004, Davis announced that he was joining the law firm of Loeb & Loeb.

Davis has done several media interviews about his legacy. He appeared prominently in the documentary Enron: The Smartest Guys in the Room.

The debate about his legacy and role in the energy woes that proved to be his downfall remains. In a CNN interview on August 5, 2005, Davis expressed that he felt vindicated because of the revelation that Enron manipulated the California energy market and because of Schwarzenegger's then-low approval ratings. He also indicated that he had no interest in running for governor again, although he had been urged to run by some Democrats.

Davis was a guest lecturer at UCLA's School of Public Policy in 2006 alongside former Republican State Senator Jim Brulte. He wrote an introduction for a journalist's book on the Amber alert system for missing children, a cause he championed.

On April 23, 2007, Davis was appointed to the Board of Directors of animation company DiC Entertainment as a non-executive.

On May 21, 2009, Davis was keynote speaker at the Columbia Law School graduation ceremony.

In September 2024, Davis was one of several former governors to sign an open letter to all 50 current governors urging them to certify their states' votes after the upcoming November election.

== Public image and political views ==
Davis's moderate record made it difficult for him to appeal to the core constituency of the Democratic Party. During the recall, Davis failed to gain the full support he needed from his more liberal Democratic base. He had a reputation of being beholden to supporters yet unable to satisfy them. Davis's leadership and compromise-building skills have also been questioned. He was also hurt by redistricting in 2000 that made most districts safe for the incumbent party, limiting some legislators' need and willingness to compromise.

When Davis was inaugurated as governor of California, he said, "I'm a governor, not a judge". Davis vowed to uphold all of the laws of the state, even the ones with which he personally disagreed. Davis defended Proposition 187 initially, but when it was declared unconstitutional by the Ninth Circuit Court of Appeals, he did not appeal the decision.

Davis's personality was often described as aloof and his political style cautious and calculated instead of charismatic. His personality forced him to depend more on political skills, such as fundraising, to win elections. Davis's tendency to micromanage his administration made it difficult for people to present opposing views and even drove some out of service.

As Davis left office in 2003, the San Francisco Chronicle published an editorial discussing his legacy. The newspaper claimed that he lacked vision, allowed the legislature and its policies to define his tenure and had a "robotic governing style" that focused on fundraising instead of personal relationships. The Chronicle commented that Davis was often on the right side of the issues but that being on the right side of the issues alienated the electorate. Davis lacked charisma and seemed to be more passionate about winning campaigns than governing. Davis never showed emotion to the voters. He spent much of his campaign time talking about his accomplishments instead of providing voters with a vision.

== Personal life ==
Davis met his wife-to-be, Sharon Ryer, while on an airplane tending to official business in 1978. Davis and Ryer married in 1983, with California Supreme Court Justice Rose Bird officiating.

== See also ==
Political offices
Preceded by Kenneth Cory	Controller of California; 1987–1995	Succeeded by Kathleen Connell
Preceded by Leo T. McCarthy	Lieutenant Governor of California; 1995–1999	Succeeded by Cruz Bustamante
Preceded by Pete Wilson	Governor of California; 1999–2003	Succeeded by Arnold Schwarzenegger
Party political offices
Preceded by Kathleen Brown	Democratic nominee for Governor of California; 1998, 2002	Succeeded by Cruz Bustamante
Preceded by Paul E. Patton	Chair of the Democratic Governors Association; 2000–2001	Succeeded by Parris Glendening
U.S. order of precedence (ceremonial)
Preceded by Jerry Brown as Former Governor	Order of precedence of the United States	Succeeded by Arnold Schwarzenegger as Former Governor
