= Aileen Adams (public figure) =

American attorney and former public official

- Born: Aileen Catherine Adams
- Education: Smith College (BA); Howard University Law School (JD)
- Occupations: Attorney, public official, nonprofit executive
- Known for: Director, Office for Victims of Crime; California state cabinet secretary; Los Angeles Deputy Mayor

Aileen Catherine Adams is an American attorney, public official, and nonprofit leader who has held senior federal, state, and municipal government positions, including Director of the Office for Victims of Crime at the United States Department of Justice and Secretary of the California State and Consumer Services Agency. She is a member of the American Academy of Arts and Sciences, and a board member of the Weingart Foundation.

== Early life and education ==
Adams earned a bachelor's degree in Spanish and Latin American studies from Smith College and a Juris Doctor from Howard University School of Law. She was admitted to the State Bar of California in 1972.

== Career ==
=== Santa Monica Rape Treatment Center ===
In the early part of her career, Adams worked to assist rape victims. Shortly after graduating from Harvard Law School, she volunteered to work on a rape case where an alleged rapist could not be prosecuted unless the victim could prove she had actively fought back. Adams served as the legal counsel for the Santa Monica Rape Treatment Center from 1982-1984.

=== Federal government ===
Adams served as Director of the Office for Victims of Crime (OVC) within the U.S. Department of Justice during the administration of President Bill Clinton, beginning in 1994. As OVC Director, she oversaw federal programs supporting crime victims and administered funding under the Victims of Crime Act, including distribution of funds to the victims of the Oklahoma City bombing. Her appointment and service were recorded in the Congressional Record.

During her time at the Office for Victims of Crime, Adams was the keynote speaker at the Annual Conference of the National Center for Women in Policing.

=== California state government ===
Adams served as Secretary of the California State and Consumer Services Agency from 1999 to 2003 under Governor Gray Davis. In that role, she oversaw multiple state departments and regulatory entities, including the Department of Consumer Affairs. She faced some heat during Davis' second term, over approving a large contract with Oracle during a budget crisis, testifying that she had not been aware of or heard any concerns raised by the Department of Finance, she would have taken different steps.

=== Municipal government ===
Adams served as the Los Angeles Deputy Mayor in the Office of Strategic Partnerships during the administration of Mayor Eric Garcetti. In this role, she worked on cross-sector partnerships between the City of Los Angeles and nonprofit and philanthropic organizations. She also served as Deputy Mayor during the administration of Mayor Antonio Villaraigosa.

Adams has also appeared a number of times on C-SPAN in connection with her public service activities.

=== Center for Law and Social Policy ===
Adams worked for Ralph Nader at the Center for the Study of Responsive Law and at the Center for Law and Social Policy, where she was in charge of the center's initiative on deceptive advertising practices. While in that role, Adams spoke at the American Advertising Federation's Government Affairs Conference in Washington, D.C., in 1971, pushing against the concept of ad industry self-regulation.

== Publications ==
Adams authored an article in HuffPost titled "Women Waging Peace."

== Awards and honors ==
Adams has received civic recognition for her public service and philanthropic work, including being honored at the Crystal Eagle Awards.

She was elected as a member of the American Academy of Arts and Sciences.

== Philanthropy and nonprofit leadership ==
Adams has served on the Board of Directors of the Weingart Foundation. She has also been affiliated with the Alliance for Children's Rights.

She has participated in civic and advocacy initiatives, including leadership support for March for Our Lives.
