= Lloyd Leith =

American basketball referee and coach (1902–1979)

Lloyd R. Leith
- Born: December 7, 1902; San Francisco, California, U.S.
- Died: September 30, 1979 (aged 76)
- Occupations: Basketball referee, basketball coach

Lloyd R. Leith (December 7, 1902 – September 30, 1979) was an American basketball referee and high school coach. The San Francisco, California native officiated 16 NCAA Men's Division I Basketball Championships between 1939 and 1955. He also served as head coach at Balboa High School (1931–36), George Washington High School (1936–42) and Mission High School (1945–72).
