= Julian Neal =

American football player (born 2003)

No. 1 – Seattle Seahawks
- Position: Cornerback
- Roster status: Injured reserve

Personal information
- Born: February 12, 2003 (age 23); San Francisco, California, U.S.
- Listed height: 6 ft 2 in (1.88 m)
- Listed weight: 203 lb (92 kg)

Career information
- High school: Mission (San Francisco, California)
- College: Fresno State (2021–2024); Arkansas (2025)
- NFL draft: 2026: 3rd round, 99th overall pick

Career history
- Seattle Seahawks (2026–present)

Career NFL statistics as of Week 4, 2026
- Tackles: 2
- Stats at Pro Football Reference

Julian Neal (born February 12, 2003) is an American professional football cornerback for the Seattle Seahawks of the National Football League (NFL). He played college football for the Fresno State Bulldogs and the Arkansas Razorbacks and was selected by the Seahawks in the third round of the 2026 NFL draft.

== Early life ==
Neal attended Mission High School in San Francisco, California, where he played wide receiver, defensive end and defensive back. He committed to Fresno State University to play college football.

== College career ==
=== Fresno State ===
Neal played at Fresno State from 2021 to 2024. In 30 games, he recorded 44 tackles and two interceptions.

=== Arkansas ===
Neal originally transferred to Stanford University in December 2024 after the season before transferring again to the University of Arkansas in April 2025. He became a starter at Arkansas in 2025.

== Professional career ==
Pre-draft measurables
Height	Weight	Arm length	Hand span	Wingspan	40-yard dash	10-yard split	20-yard split	20-yard shuttle	Three-cone drill	Vertical jump	Broad jump	Bench press
6 ft 1 5/8 in (1.87 m)	203 lb (92 kg)	32 3/4 in (0.83 m)	9 1/2 in (0.24 m)	6 ft 7 1/4 in (2.01 m)	4.49 s	1.59 s	2.63 s	4.20 s	6.90 s	40.0 in (1.02 m)	11 ft 2 in (3.40 m)	16 reps
All values from NFL Combine/Pro Day

Neal was selected by the Seattle Seahawks with the 99th overall pick in the third round of the 2026 NFL draft.
