= Charles Phan =

American chef and restaurateur (1962–2025)

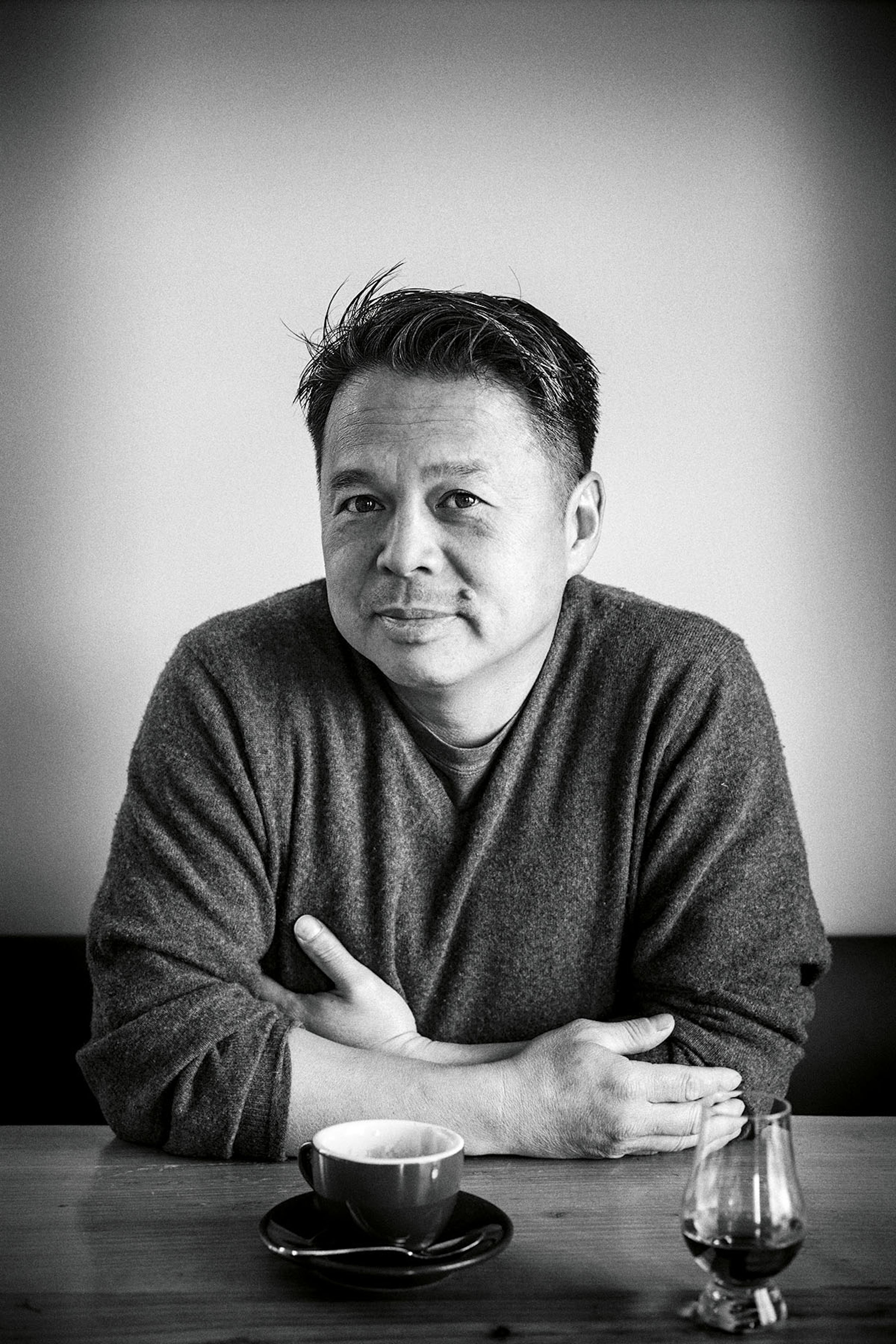
- Phan in 2014
- Born: Toàn Phan; July 30, 1962; Da Lat, South Vietnam (now Vietnam)
- Died: January 20, 2025 (aged 62); San Francisco, California, U.S.
- Education: University of California, Berkeley
- Culinary career
- Current restaurants
- The Slanted Door, San Francisco

Charles Phan (born Toàn Phan; July 30, 1962 – January 20, 2025) was a Vietnamese-born American chef, cookbook author, and restaurateur. He was the executive chef and founder of the Slanted Door restaurant in San Francisco, California, and the Slanted Door Group of restaurants. He published two cookbooks about Vietnamese cuisine.

== Early life and education ==
Phan grew up in Da Lat, South Vietnam (now Vietnam) after his parents fled China in the 1960s. His surname is of Vietnamese origin and pronounced “fän”. His given name is Toàn but that later changed to Charles when he came to the U.S. In Vietnam, his father, Hung Con Phan, and uncle opened a small grocery store where Phan and his five siblings helped with the family business. This would eventually become the inspiration for his San Francisco restaurant, Wo Hing General Store (2011–2013).

In April 1975, just before Saigon fell to the Vietcong, 13 year old Phan and his family of 8 fled with 400 other people aboard a cargo ship. The ship eventually arrived to Guam where they lived for 18 months. There, Phan's family was sponsored by an American couple who supported them with housing. While helping his aunt to cook and watching Jacques Pépin's television show, Phan became interested in cooking.

After living on Guam for 18 months, the family immigrated again and settled in San Francisco, California. He was raised in the Chinatown neighborhood and attended Mission High School, graduating in 1982. He was admitted to the University of California, Berkeley’s Department of Architecture but dropped out his third year to protest a steep tuition increase. After leaving college early, Phan worked in software sales and other various jobs while he was developing the concept for his first restaurant, The Slanted Door.

== Career ==
As a teenager, his curiosity for food began at home while watching his mom, Quyen Van Tran, and his aunt cook and while exploring the food scene of San Francisco. Phan saw an opportunity to introduce American diners to the world of Vietnamese food. He started by hosting small dinners for friends, refining his style of cooking and developing his restaurant idea.

In 1995, Phan opened his first restaurant, The Slanted Door, as a fine dining restaurant serving Vietnamese cuisine. Its goal was to elevate Vietnamese food with modern design, sustainable local ingredients, quality teas and wine pairings.

The Slanted Door’s first location was on Valencia Street in the Mission neighborhood of San Francisco. It later moved to the SOMA (South of Market) neighborhood in 2002 and finally to its famous location at the historic Ferry Building in 2005. Slanted Door was one of the first restaurants in San Francisco to feature craft cocktails.

In 2004, Phan was recognized as “Best Chef: California” from the James Beard Foundation. In the years that followed, Phan continued to expand his restaurant group with more cafes and bars.

== Personal life and death ==
Phan resided in San Francisco, California with his wife and three children.

Phan was a frequent tennis player and often challenged his friends to a game. It was at one of his preferred courts that he was playing tennis with Michelle Mah, his Director of Operations (Slanted Door Group), that he suffered a heart attack and died later from cardiac arrest at a hospital in San Francisco on January 20, 2025, at age 62.

== Restaurants ==
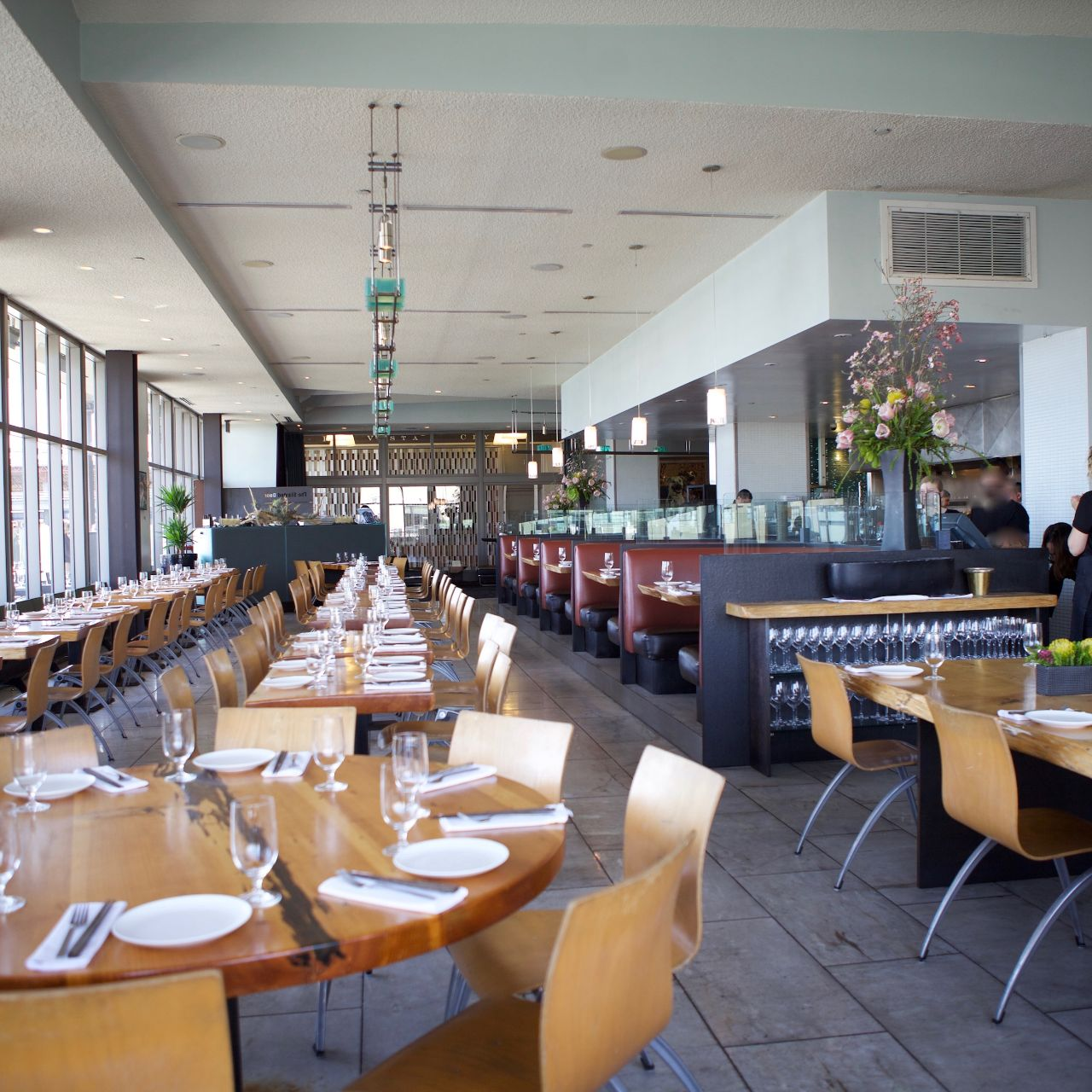
Slanted Door (2010), San Francisco

=== Active restaurants ===
- Slanted Door, San Ramon (2019–present)
- Slanted Door, Napa (2023-present)
- Chuck's Takeaway Lunch Catering, San Francisco (2022–present)
- Slanted Door, San Francisco (1995–reopening date TBC)

=== Closed restaurants ===
- Out The Door at Westfield San Francisco Centre, San Francisco (2007–unknown)
- Academy Cafe at California Academy of Sciences, San Francisco (2008–2014)
- The Coachman, San Francisco (2014–2015)
- Hard Water, San Francisco (2013–2020)
- Heaven's Dog, San Francisco (2009–2012)
- OTD (Out The Door Bush Street), San Francisco (2010–2021)
- Out The Door at Ferry Building, San Francisco (2005–2020)
- Rice and Bones at Bauer Wurster Hall, College of Environmental Design, University of California, Berkeley (2017–2023)
- South at SFJazz, San Francisco (2013–2017)
- Wo Hing General Store, San Francisco (2011–2013)
- Slanted Door, Las Vegas (2020)
- Slanted Door, Beaune (2024–2026)

== Publications ==
- Phan, Charles (2012). Vietnamese Home Cooking. Jessica Battilana, Eric Wolfinger, Slanted Door. Berkeley: Ten Speed Press. ISBN 978-1-60774-053-7. OCLC 772137165.
- Phan, Charles (2014). The Slanted Door : Modern Vietnamese Food. Janny Hu, Ed Anderson. Berkeley: Clarkson Potter/Ten Speed Press. ISBN 978-1-60774-054-4. OCLC 881318178.

== Awards ==
- 2004 – Phan was recognized as “Best Chef: California” from the James Beard Foundation
- 2011 – Phan was inducted into the James Beard Foundation's Who's Who of Food and Beverage in America
- 2013 – Phan's book “Vietnamese Home Cooking” won the IACP (International Association of Culinary Professionals) Cookbook Award for Chefs and Restaurants
- 2014 – The Slanted Door was recognized by the James Beard Foundation as an Outstanding Restaurant in America
- 2015 – Phan's book “The Slanted Door” won the IACP (International Association of Culinary Professionals) Cookbook Award for Photography
