= Williams v. California =

2000 class-action lawsuit

- Court: San Francisco Superior Court
- Decided: 2004

Williams v. California was a class action lawsuit filed by the American Civil Liberties Union (ACLU) against the State of California, on behalf of California students, parents and other educational stakeholders, citing the substandard quality of learning resources at Balboa High School as a prominent example.

Filed in 2000 by the ACLU to address "savagely unequal" conditions across California schools, the lawsuit highlighted a failure to provide adequate facilities, textbooks, and teachers for the poorest schools in the state. Balboa students joined the lawsuit; and the case was named after Eliezer Williams, then a middle school student soon to enter Balboa. The lawsuit was resolved in 2004, with the State of California agreeing to provide US$138 million for instructional material, US$50 million for critical facility repairs at nearly 2,400 state schools, and to reimburse school districts for future repairs of deficient facilities. Estimates indicate California may be liable for up to US$1 billion in reimbursements over several years.

The "Williams Settlement", often mis-labeled "Williams Act", became a common reference in California discussions around education policy and procedures, especially as the COVID-19 pandemic compelled many urgent expansions of distance education and consequent reviews of education systems.

== Cleare et al. v. WCCUSD ==
In 2024, civil-rights law firm Public Advocates filed a lawsuit against West Contra Costa Unified School District, accusing the district of violating students’ rights over issues raised in complaints alleging facility safety and staffing problems at Stege Elementary and John F. Kennedy High School, both in Richmond, and Helms Middle School in San Pablo. As action was taken to fix the safety issues, those were dropped from the suit.

The lawsuit was the first to be brought under the Williams vs. California settlement and was decided in favor of the plaintiffs. The court found that WCCUSD's reasons for not staffing classrooms were unpersuasive, writing, "As we see it, the issue before us is simple and straightforward. The importance of public education is beyond question—or need of justification. Central to its function is the belief that knowledge should be imparted by qualified instructors. As quoted, California law mandates the District’s duty to fill every classroom with a permanent and qualified teacher for the school year."
