= George H. Ruge =

George Henry Ruge (29 January 1921, in San Francisco, California – 29 March 2011, in Greenbrae, California) is a Charter Member of the Broadcast Legends. Mr. Ruge's broadcast career spanned many years in San Francisco radio at stations KYA, KFRC, KNBR, and KGO. He created, wrote, produced and broadcast the "Sunday Special" biographies on KFRC that profiled notable artists of the day, including The Beatles, Louis Armstrong, and Benny Goodman among others. Ruge hosted a talk show on KGO radio before becoming that station's News Director.

Ruge is a graduate of Balboa High School (San Francisco), and San Francisco State College.
