= Mission High School (San Francisco) =

Public high school in San Francisco

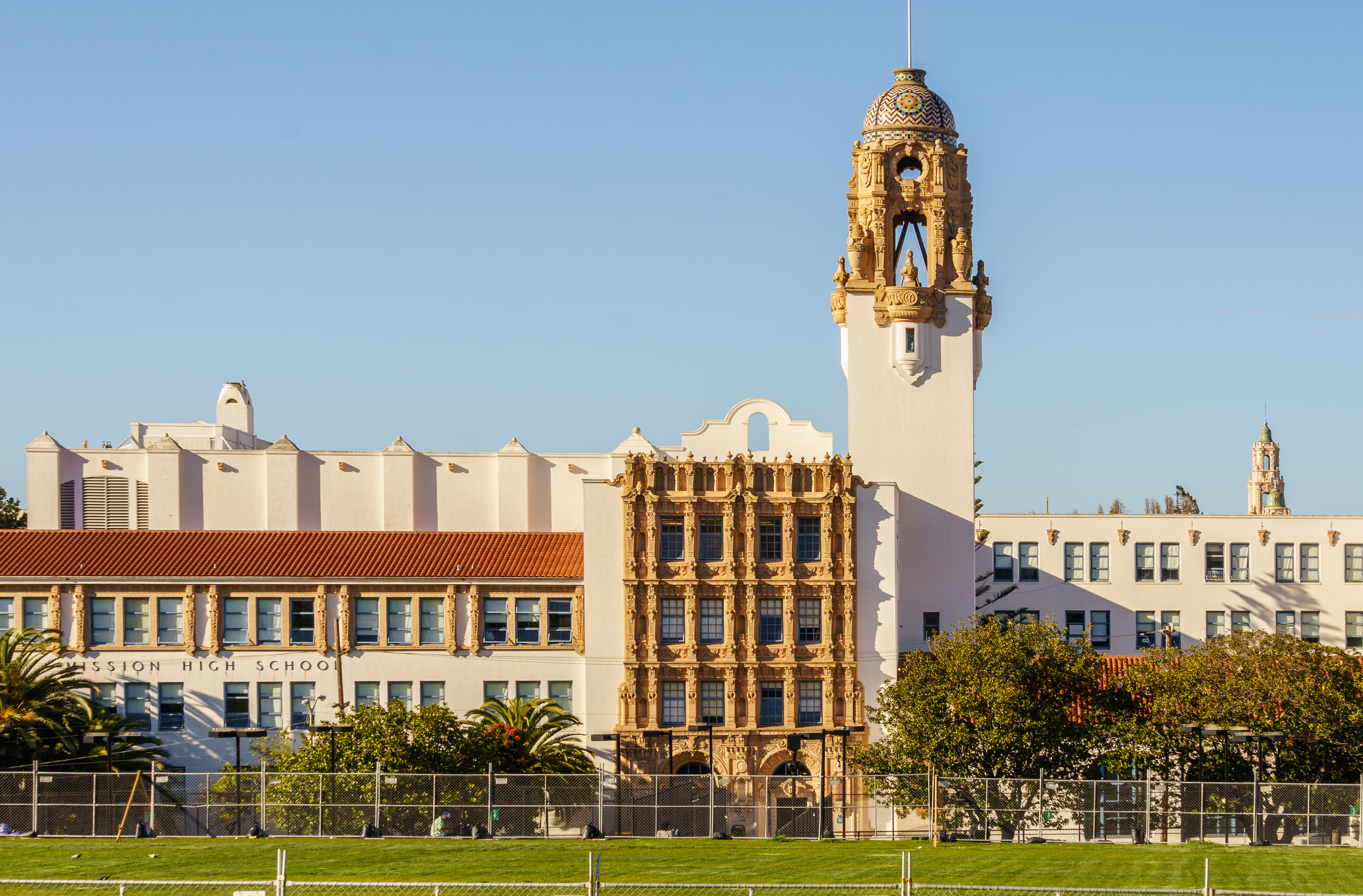

Location
- 3750 18th Street; San Francisco, California 94114; United States; 37.761775°N 122.427306°W

Information
- Established: 1890
- Principal: Tanya Harris
- Faculty: 66 (2007-8)
- Grades: 9-13
- Enrollment: 1,076 (2016-17)
- Campus: Urban
- Colours: Brown and Gold
- Teams: Bears
- Graduates (2016): 198
- Website: Mission High

San Francisco Designated Landmark
- Designated: February 9, 2007
- Reference no.: 255

Mission High School is a public high school in the San Francisco Unified School District (SFUSD), San Francisco, California.

Serving grades 9–12, Mission is the oldest high school on its original site in San Francisco; it has been on 18th Street, between Dolores and Church, since 1896. The original campus burned in 1922, and the replacement was completed in two stages, the west wing in 1925 and the main building was dedicated by San Francisco mayor James Rolph on June 12, 1927. Originally, girls and boys had separate courtyards. The boys' is overlooked by the "baby tower," about 100 feet (30 m) high, and the girls' (right) topped by a 127-foot (39 m)-high baroque dome. Mission Creek runs beneath the school.

The school is two blocks from Mission Dolores, from which it gets its name. Latino students constitute the largest ethnic group in the school.

== History ==
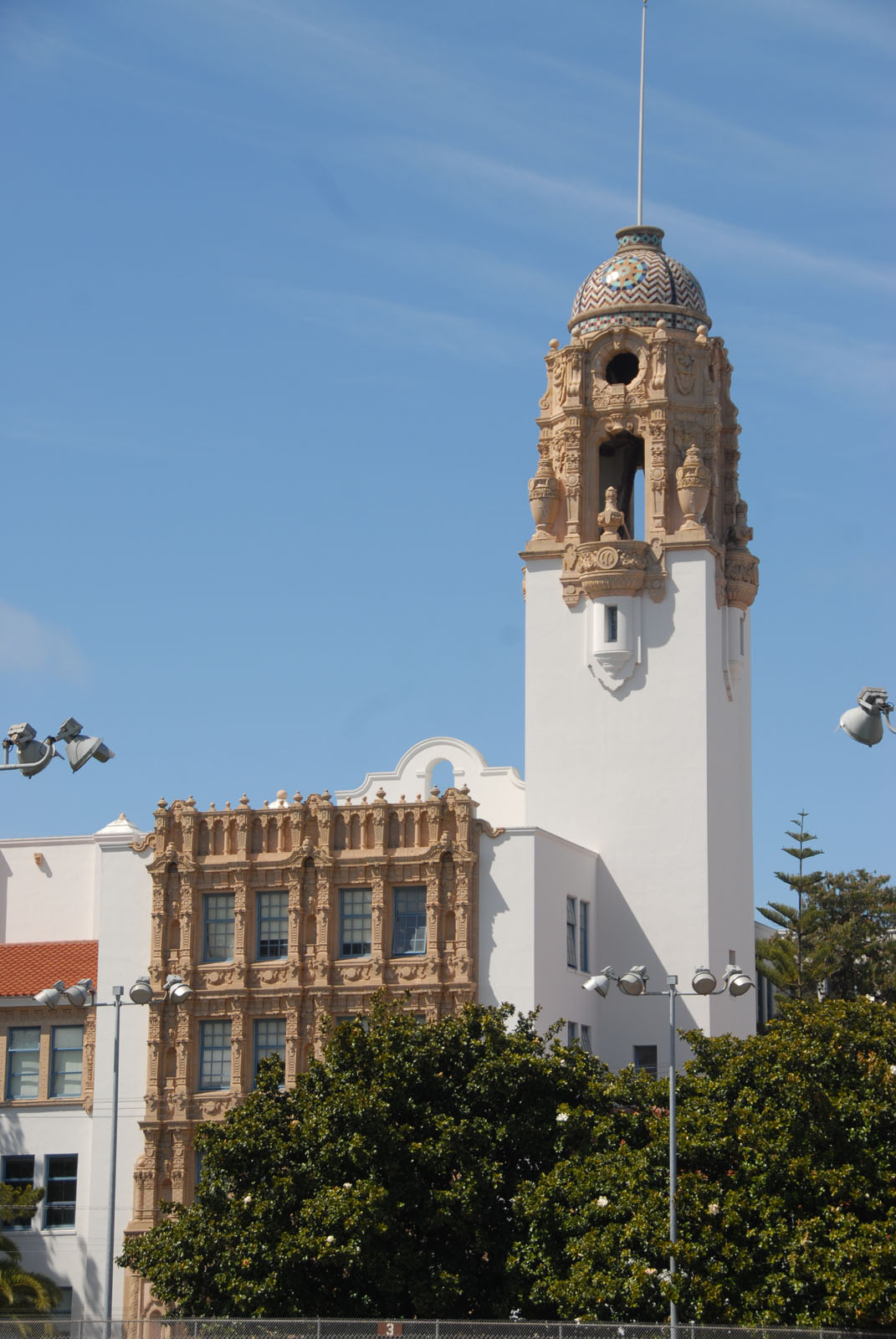
The high school tower

Mission High School was founded in 1890, although it was housed in various Mission District locations until 1896. That year, the Board of Education purchased a parcel of land from the Jewish Cemetery Association to construct a permanent school building. The original Mission High School building was completed in 1898 as a three-story brick school designed in the Italian Renaissance Beaux-Arts style. The building withstood the 1906 earthquake, and became a neighborhood shelter, while Dolores Park, which stands across the street from the school, became a tent city for displaced residents.

Humboldt Evening High School was a night high school at Mission High School, when it was destroyed by fire.

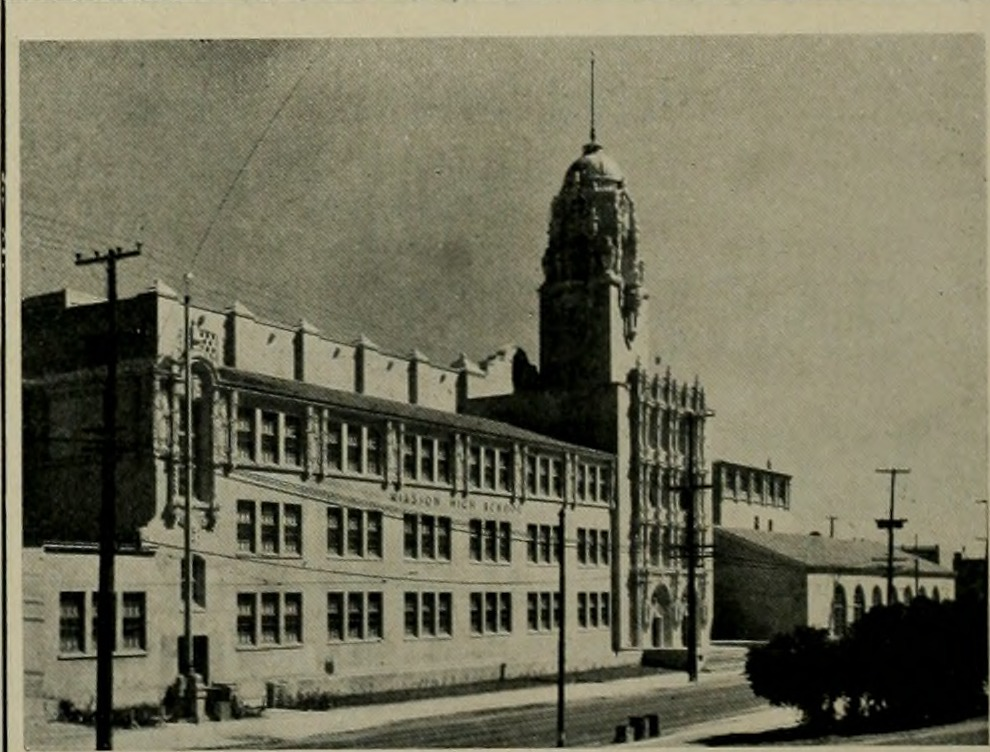
Mission High School in 1930

In 1922, the original Mission High School was destroyed by fire. The present Mission High School complex was then constructed in a California Churrigueresque style between 1925 and 1927, during the height of San Francisco's "Golden Age" of school construction. John W. Reid Jr., San Francisco's City Architect, was the designer. The elaborate ornamentation on the school is likely due in part to the visual proximity to the nearby Mission Dolores Basilica, which features towers and ornamentation in the Churrigueresque architectural style.

In 1936, California artist Edith Anne Hamlin was commissioned under the Works Progress Administration's Federal Art Project to create a series of western-themed murals for the school. Noted artist Maynard Dixon consulted with Hamlin on the murals, and the pair married in 1937. Two murals showing the founding of nearby Mission Dolores still survive, while the third was lost during a 1970s seismic retrofit. The late 1930s also saw the construction of Drew Athletic Field behind the school, in an area that had been occupied by houses fronting on Dorland Street (that one block of Dorland was removed to construct the field).

Mission High School was retrofitted to meet earthquake safety standards starting in 1972. This included the removal of some of the building's architectural ornamentation, as well as the loss of the WPA Hamlin mural. Students attended Polytechnic High School until their return in 1978. The building continues to function as a public high school and remains an architectural landmark in the Dolores Park area of San Francisco.

In the 2007–08 school year, principal Kevin Truitt won SFUSD Principal of the Year and in 2014 principal Eric Guthertz won the same award.

== Statistics ==
=== Demographics ===
White	Latino	Asian	African American	Pacific Islander	American Indian	Two or More Races
9%	52.5%	11.2%	15.6%	1.2%	0.8%	1.8%

According to U.S. News & World Report, 91% of Mission's student body is "of color," with 77% of the student body coming from an economically disadvantaged household, determined by student eligibility for California's Reduced-price meal program.

=== Standardized Testing ===
SAT Scores for 2015-16
	Reading Average	Writing Average	Math Average
Mission	412	408	444
District	474	467	517
State	484	477	494

== Diversity ==
Mission High school is the first public school to hold an LGBTQ/Drag Show Assembly.

== Programs ==
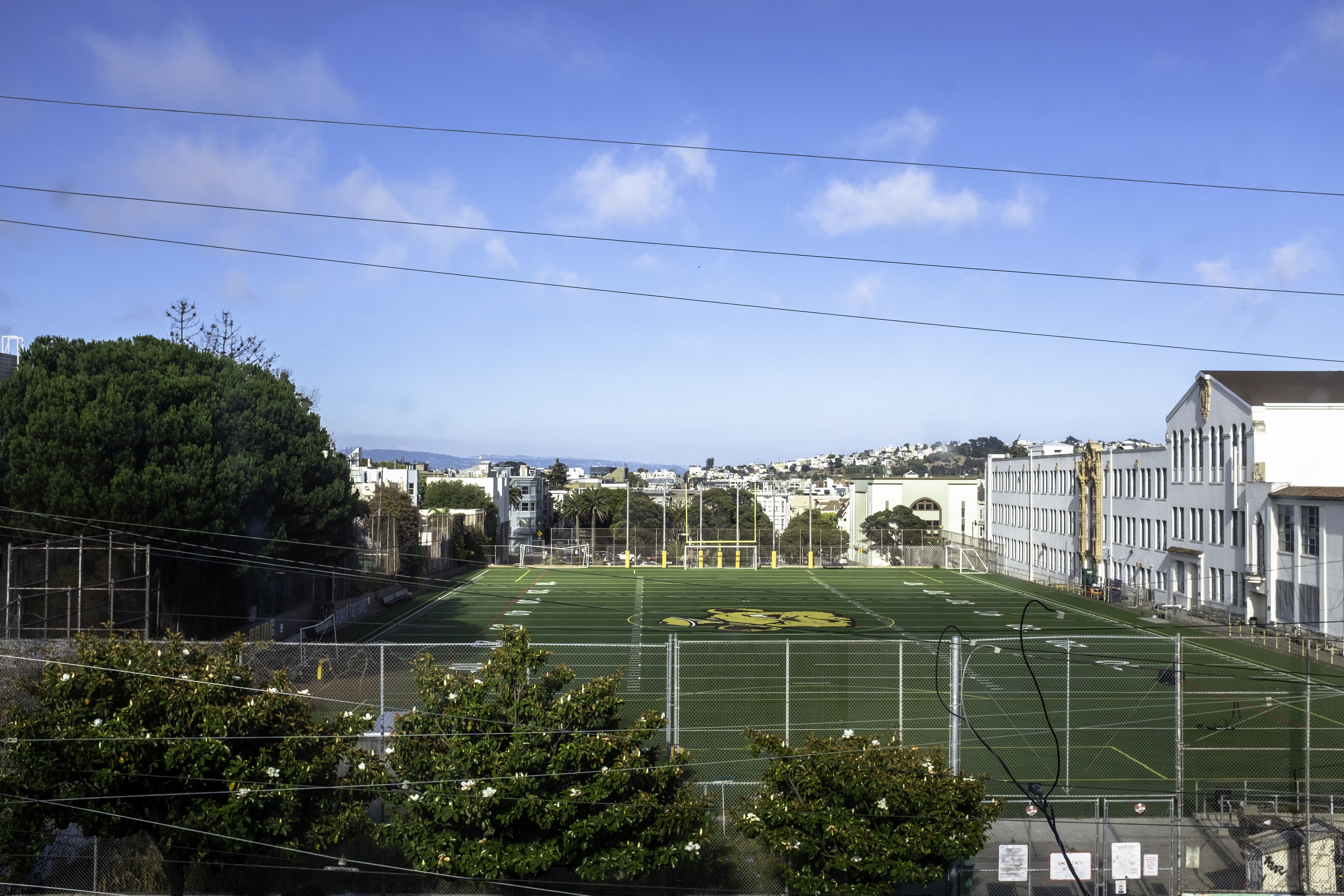
Mission High's football field

Mission is the Academic Scholars Advancement Program (ASAP) is a summer program that sends 150 Mission High School athletes attended 31 programs. They traveled to 22 locations in nine states, and a few ventured as far as Japan, China, and Italy. ASAP helps cover the bill to send these kids to a summer program.

== Notable alumni and faculty members ==
- Wally Berger, class of 1923 — professional baseball player, starting center fielder in the first All-Star Game
- Dorothy Bryant — teacher, novelist, and playwright
- Jeffrey Cariaso, class of 1990 — former professional basketball coach and player, Philippine Basketball Association.
- Joe Cronin, class of 1923 — professional baseball player and Hall of Famer
- Babe Dahlgren, class of 1932 — professional baseball player
- Vincent DeDomenico, class of 1933 — inventor of Rice-A-Roni and developer of the Napa Valley Wine Train
- Bobby Freeman — rock and roll and R&B singer from the late 1950s; "Do You Want to Dance"
- Alan Gallagher, 1963 — former San Francisco Giants third baseman
- Eddie Joost, class of 1934 — professional baseball player
- Walt Judnich, class of 1934 — professional baseball player
- Lloyd Leith — Basketball Hall of Fame coach and referee
- Gene Merlino, class of 1946 - Grammy Award winning singer
- Guy Mitchell — 1950s pop singer
- Julian Neal, 2021 – National football League cornerback for Seattle Seahawks
- Melissa Ng, 1990 — Hong Kong TV actress
- Lothar Osiander — professional soccer coach (MLS, US National Soccer Team)
- Charles Phan — chef, cookbook author, and restaurateur
- James Rolph — governor of California (1931–1934) and mayor of San Francisco (1912–1931)
- Thomas Rolph — United States representative from California, younger brother of James Rolph Jr.
- Carlos Santana — musician and songwriter
- Jorge Santana — musician, Malo (band)
- Gus Triandos, 1948 — professional baseball player
- Leland Yee — California State Senator

=== Faculty ===
- Robert Roth — social studies teacher

== See also ==
- San Francisco County high schools
- List of San Francisco Designated Landmarks
