= George Marshall Ruge =

American film director

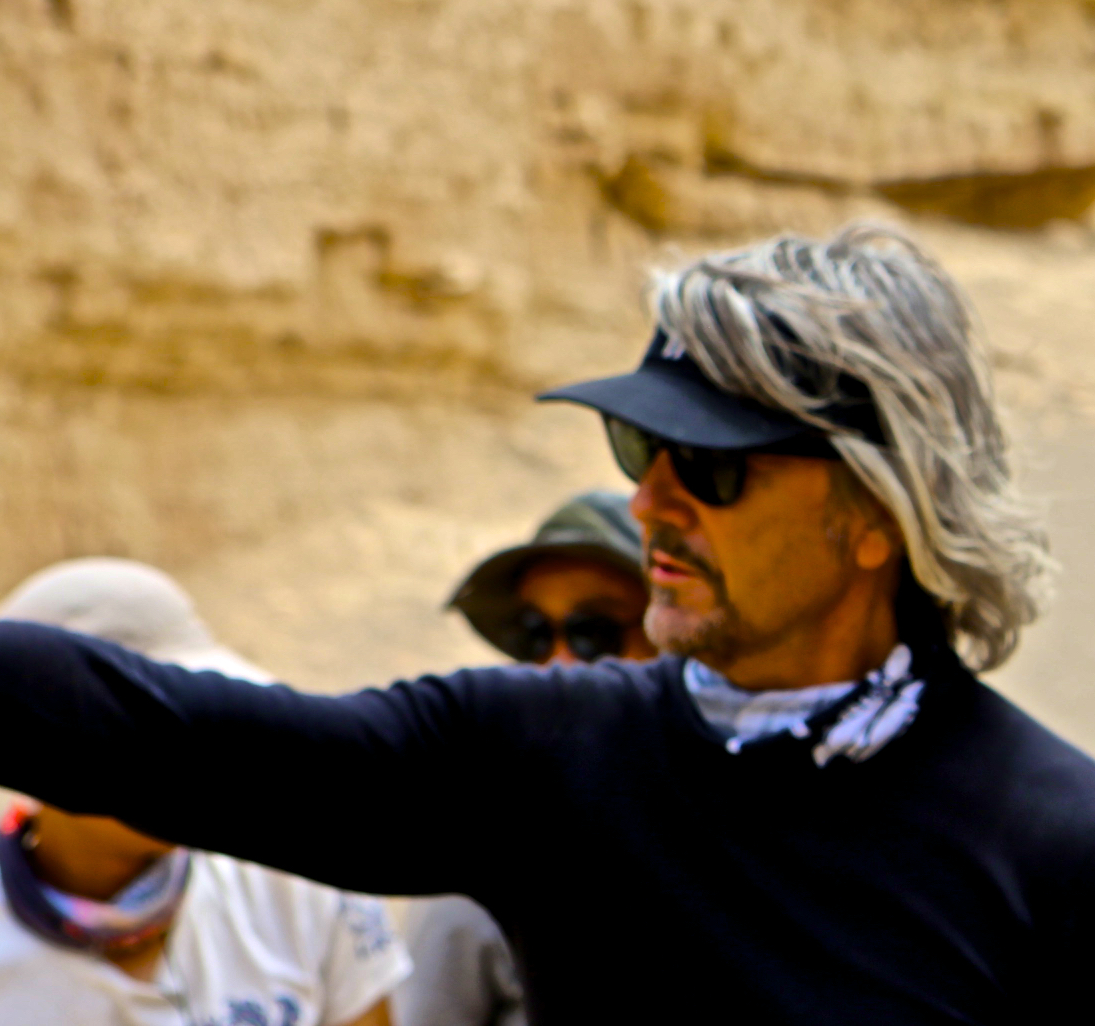
- George Marshall Ruge
- Born: San Francisco, California, U.S.
- Occupations: Film Director, Producer, Writer, Actor, Second Unit Director, Action Designer
- Years active: 1974-Present

George Marshall Ruge is an American film director, producer, writer, second unit director, stunt coordinator, and actor.

Ruge is known for his work as director, second unit director, and stunt coordinator on such film projects as the Pirates of the Caribbean four-film franchise, and as stunt coordinator on The Lord of the Rings film trilogy. Ruge is featured in the Daily Variety (2011) annual Below The Line Impact Report: The Top 50 as second unit director and was the recipient of the American Choreography Award (2004) for Outstanding Achievement in Choreography in Film: Pirates of the Caribbean: Curse of the Black Pearl.

== Recent filmography ==
- The Dark Tower (2017)
- The Great Wall (2016)
- Dracula Untold (2014)
- RoboCop (2014)
- G.I. Joe: Retaliation (2013)
- Pirates of the Caribbean: On Stranger Tides (2011)
- The Sorcerer's Apprentice (2010)
- National Treasure: Book of Secrets (2007)
- Pirates of the Caribbean: At World's End (2007)
- Pirates of the Caribbean: Dead Man's Chest (2006)
- National Treasure (2004)
- The Lord of the Rings: The Return of the King (2003)
- Pirates of the Caribbean: Curse of the Black Pearl (2003)
- The Lord of the Rings: The Two Towers (2002)
- The Lord of the Rings: The Fellowship of the Ring (2001)
