= Arthur McMahon =

Arthur McMahon may refer to:

- Arthur Henry McMahon (1862–1949), British Indian Army officer and diplomat
- Arthur McMahon (sport shooter) (born 1921), Irish sports shooter

== See also ==
- Arthur MacMahon (1890–1980), American political scientist
