= American Political Science Association =

Association of political scientists

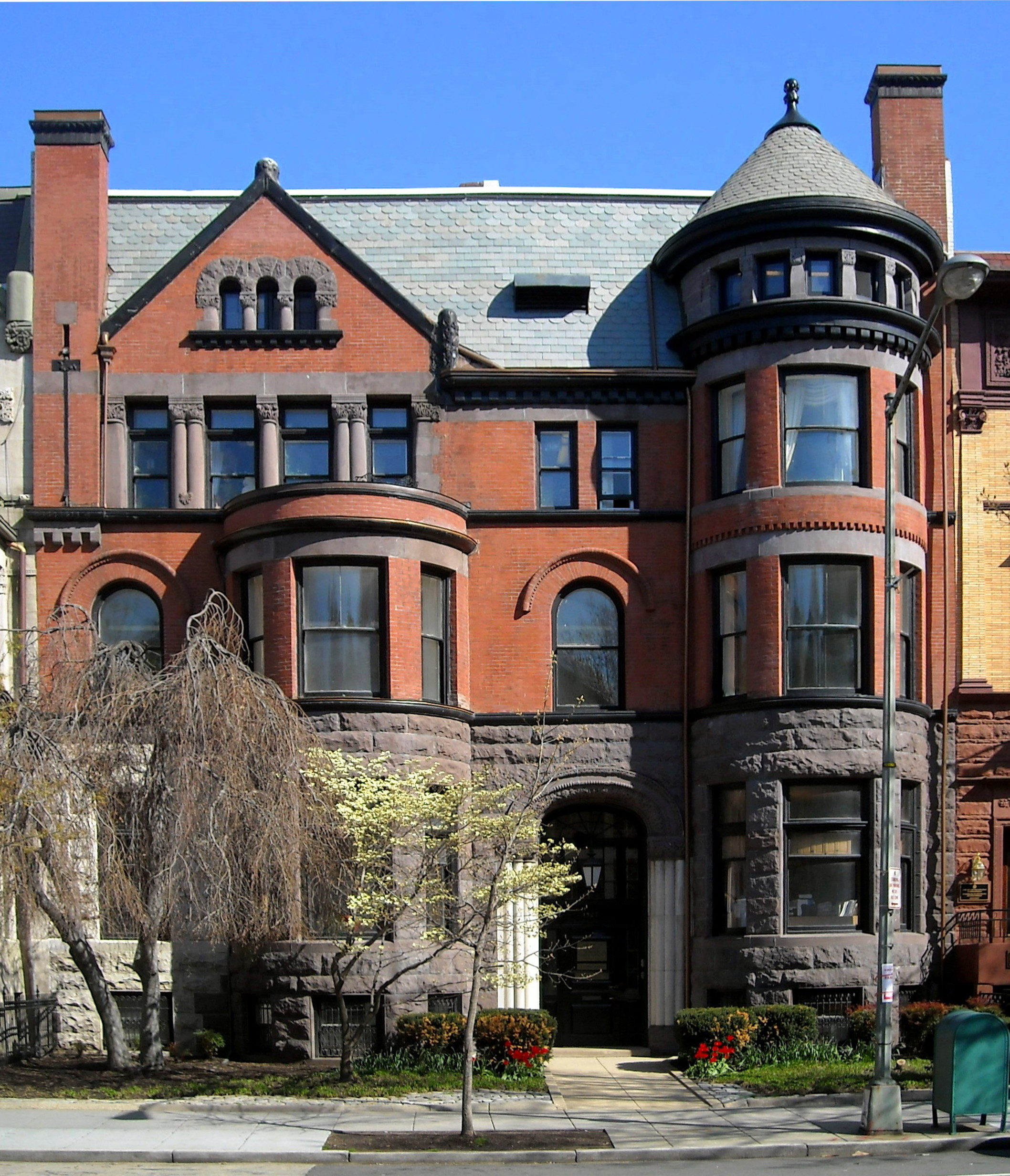
- American Political Science Association headquarters located in the Dupont Circle neighborhood of Washington, D.C.
- Formation: 1903; 123 years ago
- Type: Professional association
- Headquarters: 1527 New Hampshire Avenue NW, Washington, D.C., U.S.
- Location: Washington, D.C., U.S.
- Region served: United States
- Fields: Political science
- President: Beth Simmons
- Executive Director: Kimberly A. Mealy
- Main organ: 4 journals
- Website: apsanet.org

The American Political Science Association (APSA) is a professional association of political scientists in the United States. Founded in 1903 in the Tilton Memorial Library (now Tilton Hall) of Tulane University in New Orleans, it publishes four academic journals: American Political Science Review, Perspectives on Politics, Journal of Political Science Education, and PS – Political Science & Politics. APSA Organized Sections publish or are associated with 15 additional journals.

APSA presidents serve one-year terms. The current president is Susan Stokes of the University of Chicago. Woodrow Wilson, who later became President of the United States, was APSA president in 1909. APSA's headquarters are at 1527 New Hampshire Avenue NW in Washington, D.C., in a historic building included in the Dupont Circle Historic District that was owned by Admiral George Remy, labor leader Samuel Gompers, the American War Mothers, and Harry Garfield, son of President James A. Garfield and president of the association from 1921 to 1922. The purchase of the house happened during Ralph J. Bunche's presidency of APSA (1953-1954), the first African American to serve in that position.

In 1969, Mae C. King was the first woman and first African-American woman to serve as a Senior Staff Associate for the Association. And in 2007, Dianne Pinderhughes served as the first African-American woman president of the association.

APSA administers the Centennial Center for Political Science and Public Affairs, which offers fellowships, conference, research space and grants for scholars, and administers Pi Sigma Alpha, the honor society for political science students. It also periodically sponsors seminars and other events for political scientists, policymakers, the media, and the general public.

== Conferences and meetings ==
The association broadly aims to encourage scholarly understanding of political ideas, norms, behaviors, and institutions, and to inform public choices about government, governance, and public policy. APSA's mission is to "support excellence in scholarship and teaching and informed discourse about politics, policy and civic participation." APSA conducts several annual conferences, which provide an environment for scholars and other professionals to network and present their work, along with other pertinent and useful resources. The APSA Annual Meeting is among the world's largest gatherings of political scientists. It occurs on Labor Day weekend each summer.

The APSA Teaching and Learning Conference is a smaller working group conference hosting cutting-edge approaches, techniques, and methodologies for the political science classroom. The conference provides a forum for scholars to share effective and innovative teaching and learning models and to discuss broad themes and values of political science education—especially the scholarship of teaching and learning.

With funding from the Andrew W. Mellon Foundation, APSA has organized political science workshops in various locations in Africa, APSA Africa Workshops. The first workshop was convened in Dakar, Senegal in partnership with the West African Research Center from July 6–27, 2008. The annual residential workshops are led by a joint U.S. and African organizing team and aimed at mid-and junior-level scholars residing in Africa. They will enhance the capacities of political scientists and their resources in East and West Africa while also providing a forum for supporting their ongoing research. Each three week workshop brings together up to 30 scholars and cover substantive issues, methodologies, and reviews of research. See also, APSA International Programs.

== Centennial Center for Political Science and Public Affairs ==
Through its facilities and endowed funding programs, APSA'S Centennial Center for Political Science and Public Affairs supports political science teaching, research, and public engagement. Opened in 2003, the centenary of APSA's establishment, the Centennial Center encourages individual research and writing in all fields of political science, facilitates collaboration among scholars working within the discipline and across the social and behavioral sciences and humanities, and promotes communication between scholars and the public.

The Centennial Center, its facilities, and research support programs continue to be made possible in part through the donations of APSA members. It assists APSA members with the costs of research, including travel, interviews, access to archives, or costs for a research assistant. Funds can also be used to assist scholars in publishing their research. Grants can range in size from $500 to $10,000, depending upon the research fund.

== Congressional Fellowship Program ==
The APSA Congressional Fellowship Program is a nonpartisan program devoted to expanding awareness of Congress. Since 1953, it has brought political scientists, journalists, federal employees, health specialists, and other professionals to Capitol Hill to experience Congress at work through fellowship placements on congressional staffs.

== Publications ==
One key component of APSA's mission is to support political science education and the professional development of its practitioners. The APSA publications program attempts to fill the diverse needs of political scientists in academic settings as well as practitioners working outside of academia, and students at various stages of their education:

=== Journals ===
- American Political Science Review (APSR)
- Journal of Political Science Education
- Perspectives on Politics
- PS: Political Science & Politics
- Organized Section Journals

== List of APSA presidents ==
- Frank J. Goodnow, 1904–1905
- Albert Shaw, 1905–1906
- Frederick N. Judson, 1906–1907
- James Bryce, 1907–1908
- Abbott Lawrence Lowell, 1908–1909
- Woodrow Wilson, 1909–1910
- Simeon E. Baldwin, 1910–1911
- Albert Bushnell Hart, 1911–1912
- Westel W. Willoughby, 1912–1913
- John Bassett Moore, 1913–1914
- Ernst Freund, 1914–1915
- Jesse Macy, 1915–1916
- Munroe Smith, 1916–1917
- Henry Jones Ford, 1917–1918
- Paul Samuel Reinsch, 1918–1919
- Leo S. Rowe, 1919–1920
- William A. Dunning, 1920–1921
- Harry A. Garfield, 1921–1922
- James Wilford Garner, 1923–1924
- Charles E. Merriam, 1924–1925
- Charles A. Beard, 1925–1926
- William Bennett Munro, 1926–1927
- Jesse S. Reeves, 1927–1928
- John A. Fairlie, 1928–1929
- Benjamin F. Shambaugh, 1929–1930
- Edward S. Corwin, 1930–1931
- William F. Willoughby, 1931–1932
- Isidor Loeb, 1932–1933
- Walter J. Shepard, 1933–1934
- Francis W. Coker, 1934–1935
- Arthur N. Holcombe, 1935–1936
- Thomas Reed Powell, 1936–1937
- Clarence A. Dykstra, 1937–1938
- Charles Grove Haines, 1938–1939
- Robert C. Brooks, 1939–1940
- Frederic A. Ogg, 1940–1941
- William Anderson, 1941–1942
- Robert E. Cushman, 1942–1943
- Leonard D. White, 1943–1944
- John Gaus, 1944–1945
- Walter F. Dodd, 1945–1946
- Arthur W. MacMahon, 1946–1947
- Henry R. Spencer, 1947–1948
- Quincy Wright, 1948–1949
- James K. Pollock, 1949–1950
- Peter H. Odegard, 1950–1951
- Luther Gulick, 1951–1952
- E. Pendleton Herring, 1952–1953
- Ralph J. Bunche, 1953–1954
- Charles McKinley, 1954–1955
- Harold D. Lasswell, 1955–1956
- E.E. Schattschneider, 1956–1957
- V.O. Key, Jr., 1957–1958
- R. Taylor Cole, 1958–1959
- Carl B. Swisher, 1959–1960
- Emmette Redford, 1960–1961
- Charles S. Hyneman, 1961–1962
- Carl J. Friedrich, 1962–1963
- C. Herman Pritchett, 1963–1964
- David B. Truman, 1964–1965
- Gabriel A. Almond, 1965–1966
- Robert A. Dahl, 1966–1967
- Merle Fainsod, 1967–1968
- David Easton, 1968–1969
- Karl W. Deutsch, 1969–1970
- Robert E. Lane, 1970–1971
- Heinz Eulau, 1971–1972
- Robert E. Ward, 1972–1973
- Avery Leiserson, 1973–1974
- Austin Ranney, 1974–1975
- James MacGregor Burns, 1975–1976
- Samuel H. Beer, 1976–1977
- John C. Wahlke, 1977–1978
- Leon D. Epstein, 1978–1979
- Warren E. Miller, 1979–1980
- Charles E. Lindblom, 1980–1981
- Seymour Martin Lipset, 1981–1982
- William H. Riker, 1982–1983
- Philip E. Converse, 1983–1984
- Richard F. Fenno, Jr., 1984–1985
- Aaron B. Wildavsky, 1985–1986
- Samuel P. Huntington, 1986–1987
- Kenneth N. Waltz, 1987–1988
- Lucian W. Pye, 1988–1989
- Judith N. Shklar, 1989–1990
- Theodore J. Lowi, 1990–1991
- James Q. Wilson, 1991–1992
- Lucius J. Barker, 1992–1993
- Charles O. Jones, 1993–1994
- Sidney Verba, 1994–1995
- Arend Lijphart, 1995–1996
- Elinor Ostrom, 1996–1997
- M. Kent Jennings, 1997–1998
- Matthew Holden Jr., 1998–1999
- Robert O. Keohane, 1999–2000
- Robert Jervis, 2000–2001
- Robert Putnam, 2001–2002
- Theda Skocpol, 2002–2003
- Susanne Hoeber Rudolph, 2003–2004
- Margaret Levi, 2004–2005
- Ira Katznelson, 2005–2006
- Robert Axelrod, 2006–2007
- Dianne Pinderhughes, 2007–2008
- Peter Katzenstein, 2008–2009
- Henry E. Brady, 2009–2010
- Carole Pateman, 2010–2011
- G. Bingham Powell, 2011–2012
- Jane Mansbridge, 2012–2013
- John Aldrich, 2013–2014
- Rodney E. Hero, 2014–2015
- Jennifer Hochschild, 2015–2016
- David A. Lake, 2016–2017
- Kathleen Thelen, 2017–2018
- Rogers Smith, 2018–2019
- Paula D. McClain 2019–2020
- Janet Box-Steffensmeier, 2020–2021
- John Ishiyama, 2021–2022
- Lisa Martin, 2022–2023
- Mark E. Warren, 2023–2024
- Taeku Lee, 2024–2025
- Susan Stokes, 2025–2026
- Beth Simmons, President-Elect

== APSA organized sections ==
APSA members may also join the 52 membership organized sections focused around research themes in political science. (Note: The numbers in the list represent the official number for the sections. The missing sections/numbers (e.g. 12) represent sections that disbanded.)

- 1. Federalism and Intergovernmental Relations
- 2. Law and Courts
- 3. Legislative Studies
- 4. Public Policy
- 5. Political Organizations and Parties
- 6. Public Administration
- 7. Conflict Processes
- 8. Representation and Electoral Systems
- 9. Presidents and Executive Politics
- 10. Political Methodology
- 11. Religion and Politics
- 13. Urban Politics
- 15. Science, Technology and Environmental Politics
- 16. Women and Politics Research
- 17. Foundations of Political Theory
- 18. Information Technology and Politics
- 19. International Security
- 20. Comparative Politics
- 21. European Politics and Society
- 22. State Politics and Policy
- 23. Political Communication
- 24. Politics and History
- 25. Political Economy
- 27. New Political Science
- 28. Political Psychology
- 29. Political Science Education
- 30. Politics, Literature, and Film
- 31. Foreign Policy
- 32. Elections, Public Opinion, and Voting Behavior
- 33. Race, Ethnicity and Politics
- 34. International History and Politics
- 35. Comparative Democratization
- 36. Human Rights
- 37. Qualitative and Multi-method Research
- 38. Sexuality and Politics
- 39. Health Politics and Policy
- 40. Canadian Politics
- 41. Political Networks
- 42. Experimental Research
- 43. Migration and Citizenship
- 44. African Politics
- 45. Class and Inequality
- 46. Ideas, Knowledge and Politics
- 47. American Political Thought
- 48. International Collaboration
- 49. Middle East and North Africa Politics
- 50. Civic Engagement
- 51. Education Politics and Policy
- 52. Formal Theory
- 53. International Relations Theory
- 54. American Political Economy
- 55. South Asian Politics

== Awards ==
To recognize excellence in the profession, the Association offers awards in the following categories:

- Dissertation Awards
- Paper and Article Awards
- Book Awards
- Career Awards
- Teaching Award and Campus Teaching Award Recognition

These awards are presented at the Association's Annual Meeting.

In addition to the APSA awards, the APSA organized sections also present over 200 awards annually to recognize important research and contributions to the profession. These awards are presented at the section's business meetings and receptions, held in conjunction with the APSA Annual Meeting.

=== David Easton Award ===
The David Easton Award is presented to a book that pushes the boundaries of contemporary political science by investigating fundamental philosophical questions about political life through interdisciplinary approaches in the social sciences and humanities. The winners are:

- 1997 – Jürgen Habermas
- 1998 – Robert Putnam
- 1999 – David Laitin
- 2000 – Jennifer Hochschild
- 2001 – Rogers Smith
- 2002 – Nancy Rosenblum
- 2003 – Sheldon Wolin
- 2004 – Scott Althaus
- 2005 – Ira Katznelson
- 2006 – Henry S. Richardson
- 2007 – Quentin Skinner
- 2009 – Carol C. Gould
- 2010 – George Shulman
- 2011 – Joseph M. Schwartz
- 2012 – Bonnie Honig
- 2012 – Wendy Brown
- 2013 – Tracy B. Strong
- 2014 (Honorable Mention) – Philip Pettit
- 2014 – Joseph Carens
- 2015 – Joan Cocks
- 2015 – Michael J. Shapiro
- 2016 – Patrick Wolfe
- 2017 – Margaret Kohn
- 2018 – Barbara Arneil
- 2018 – Clare Chambers
- 2019 – Jill Frank
- 2020 (Honorable Mention) – Lida Maxwell
- 2020 – Murad Idris
- 2021 (Honorable Mention) – Mahmood Mamdani
- 2021 – Cressida Heyes
- 2022 – Ellen Hunt Botting
- 2023 – Tommie Shelby
- 2023 – William E. Connolly
- 2024 – Melvin Rogers
- 2025 – Banu Bargu
- 2025 – Melissa Schwartzberg and Jack Knight
- 2026 – Roxanne Euben
