= John Ishiyama =

American political scientist

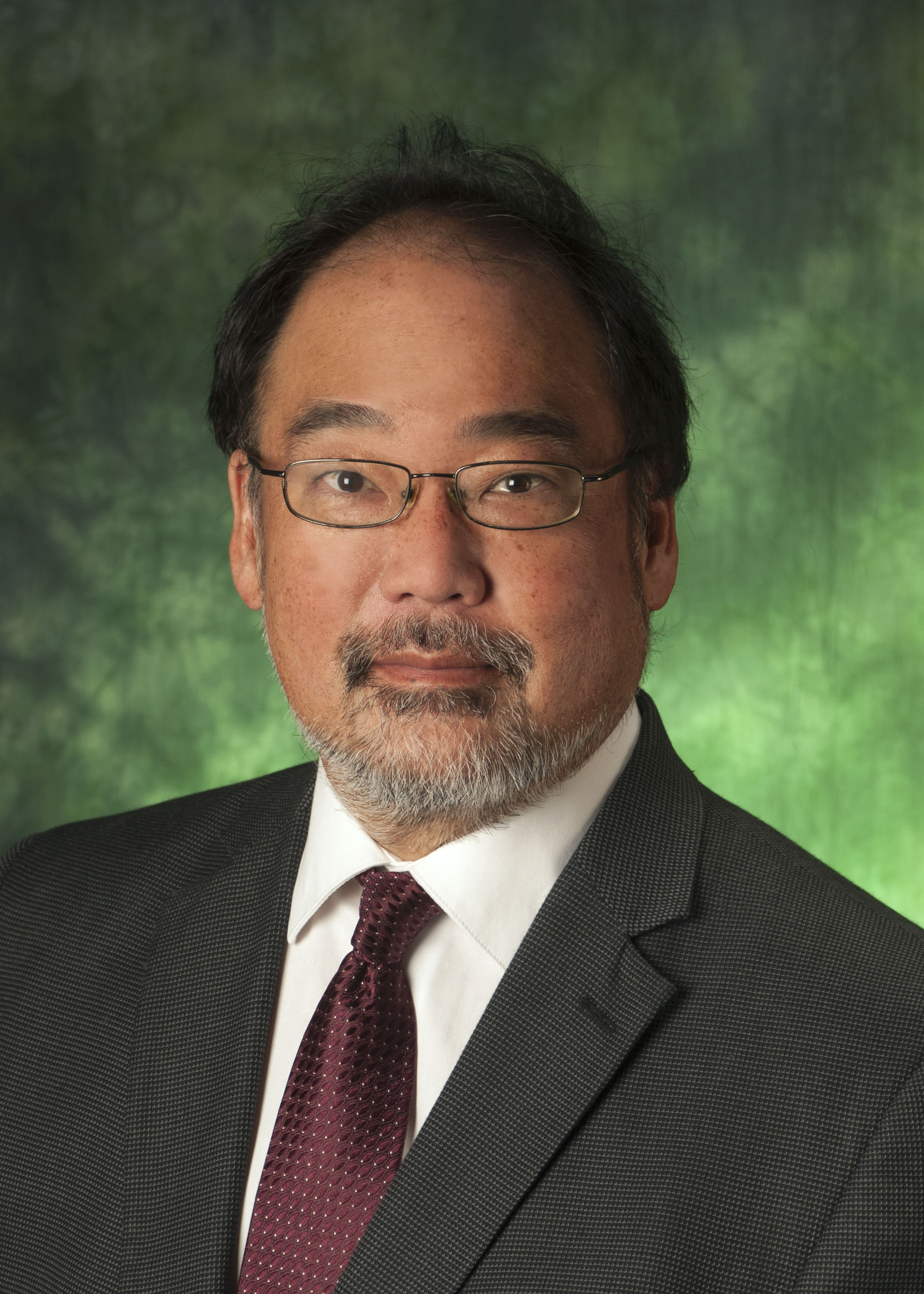
- Born: Parma, Ohio
- Education: Bowling Green State University (BA); University of Michigan (MA); Michigan State University (PhD)
- Awards: Frank Johnson Goodnow Award, APSA; Lifetime Achievement Award, APSA; Eminent Faculty Award, UNT
- Scientific career
- Fields: Political science
- Workplaces: Truman State University; University of North Texas; University of Kansas
- Thesis: Politics, and Political Party Development in New Democracies: The Cases of Estonia, Latvia, and Czechoslovakia (1992)

John Toaru Ishiyama (born 1960) is an American political scientist. He is a University Distinguished Research Professor of Political Science, and Chairperson of the Department of Political Science. He is also the Piper Professor of Texas at the University of North Texas. He studies comparative politics, particularly the party structure and democratization of Post-Soviet states, as well as the politics of Ethiopia. He is a past President of the American Political Science Association.

== Life ==
=== Education ===
Ishiyama grew up in Parma, Ohio. He has credited his decision to become a political scientist with an early interest in how things change and evolve. Ishiyama attended Bowling Green State University, graduating with a BA in political science and history in 1982. He then pursued an MA at the University of Michigan's Center for Russian and East European Studies, graduating in 1985. In 1992, Ishiyama earned a PhD in political science from Michigan State University.

=== Career ===
In 1990, Ishiyama joined the political science faculty at Truman State University, where he remained until 2008. In 2008, Ishiyama moved to the University of North Texas. Since 2002, he has also been affiliated with the Center for Russian and East European Studies at the University of Kansas.

== Academics ==
By 2023, Ishiyama had been an author or editor of 10 books and more than 190 journal articles and book chapters. He was the sole editor of two books: From Bullets to Ballots: The Transformation of Rebel Groups into Political Parties (2018) and Communist Successor Parties in Post-Communist Politics (1999), and the coauthor with Marijke Breuning of Ethnopolitics in the New Europe in 1998. Ishiyama was the sole author of the 2012 book Comparative Politics: Principles of Democracy and Democratization, which is an introduction to comparative politics that focuses on the question of what conditions promote or hinder democratic development.

Ishiyama's 2014 article "Civil Wars and Party Systems" in the Social Science Quarterly won the Charles Bonjean Award for the best article published in the Social Science Quarterly each year. His 2009 article "The Politics of Intercountry Adoption: Explaining Variation in the Legal Requirements of Sub-Saharan African Countries" in Perspectives on Politics won the Heinz Eulau Award for the best article published in the American Political Science Review and Perspectives on Politics each year.

Ishiyama was the editor-in-chief of the American Political Science Review from 2012 until 2016. He was previously the editor-in-chief of the Journal of Political Science Education, which is the journal of the education section of the American Political Science Association, from 2004 until 2012.

In 2018, Ishiyama won the American Political Science Association's Frank Johnson Goodnow Award, which "recognizes outstanding service to the political science community". That year Ishiyama also received the Lifetime Achievement Award from the Political Science section of the American Political Science Association. Ishiyama was the American Political Science Association's member of the month in July 2019, and in March 2020 Ishiyama was the sole nominee for the election to become President of the American Political Science Association in the term that begins in 2021. In 2020, Ishiyama was given the Eminent Faculty Award from the University of North Texas Foundation.

Ishiyama's work has been cited, or he has been quoted, in media outlets like The Washington Post, Vox, and The Chronicle of Higher Education.

== Selected works ==
- "The Politics of Intercountry Adoption: Explaining Variation in the Legal Requirements of Sub-Saharan African Countries" in Perspectives on Politics (2009)
- Comparative Politics: Principles of Democracy and Democratization (2012)
- "Civil Wars and Party Systems", Social Science Quarterly (2014)

== Selected awards ==
- Frank Johnson Goodnow Award, American Political Science Association (2018)
- Lifetime Achievement Award, American Political Science Association Political Science section (2018)
- Eminent Faculty Award, University of North Texas Foundation (2020)
