= Jeffrey C. Isaac =

James H. Rudy Professor of Political Science at Indiana University Bloomington

- Born: 1957 (age 68–69)

Education
- Education: Yale University (PhD, MA); Queens College, City University of New York (BA)
- Thesis: Power: A Realist View (1983)
- Doctoral advisor: Robert A. Dahl

Philosophical work
- Era: 21st-century philosophy
- Region: Western philosophy
- School: Progressivism
- Institutions: Indiana University Bloomington; Fordham University

Jeffrey C. Isaac (born 1957) is an American political theorist and the James H. Rudy Professor of Political Science at Indiana University Bloomington. He served as the editor-in-chief of Perspectives on Politics from 2009 to 2017.

== Life ==
Isaac graduated summa cum laude from Queens College, City University of New York, in 1979, where he was valedictorian. He received an M.A. from Yale University in 1980 and a Ph.D. in political science from Yale in 1983, under Robert A. Dahl. From 1983 to 1987 he was an instructor and assistant professor of political science at Fordham University. He has taught at Indiana University Bloomington since 1987, becoming associate professor in 1994 and professor in 1999, the year he was also named James H. Rudy Professor.

He has directed the university’s Center for the Study of Democracy and Public Life, chaired the Department of Political Science from 2003 to 2009, and held adjunct appointments in philosophy and Jewish studies. From 2009 to 2017 he was editor in chief of Perspectives on Politics, one of the American Political Science Association’s flagship journals, and had earlier served as its book review editor.

== Academics ==
Isaac’s research is in political theory broadly understood, especially where it intersects with political science. It addresses the possibilities and limits of radical democratic agency in the contemporary world. He has written on the political thought of Hannah Arendt and Albert Camus, on the concept of power and the philosophy of social science, on Marxism, liberalism, democracy and civil society, and on anti-communist dissident thought.

== Awards ==
- Honorary doctorate (Doctor Honoris Causa), National University of Political Studies and Public Administration, 2018
- Frank J. Goodnow Award for Distinguished Service, American Political Science Association, 2017
- National Endowment for the Humanities summer fellowship, 1990
- Indiana University Outstanding Young Faculty Award, 1990

== Publications ==
- Power and Marxist Theory: A Realist View (Cornell University Press, 1987)
- Arendt, Camus, and Modern Rebellion (Yale University Press, 1992)
- Democracy in Dark Times (Cornell University Press, 1998)
- The Poverty of Progressivism: The Future of American Democracy in a Time of Liberal Decline (Rowman & Littlefield, 2003)
- Eds., with Aurelian Craiutu, America Through European Eyes (Pennsylvania State University Press, 2009)
- Ed., The Communist Manifesto (Yale University Press, 2012), with essays by Steven Lukes, Saskia Sassen, Vladimir Tismaneanu, Stephen Eric Bronner and himself
- #AgainstTrump: Notes from Year One (Public Seminar Books/OR Books, 2018)
