= Christopher H. Sterling =

American media historian (1943–2023)

- Born: April 16, 1943; Washington D.C., U.S.
- Died: July 1, 2023 (aged 80)

Academic background
- Education: University of Wisconsin–Madison

Academic work
- Discipline: Media and public affairs
- Institutions: George Washington University; Temple University

Christopher H. Sterling (April 16, 1943 – July 1, 2023) was an American media historian. Sterling was professor of media and public affairs at The George Washington University (Washington, D.C.) where he taught from 1982. Author of numerous books on electronic media and telecommunications plus a host of research and bibliographic articles, his primary research interests centered upon the history and policy development of electronic media and telecommunications. He regularly taught courses in media law and federal regulation and society. He was an acting chair in the early 1990s and served as associate dean for graduate studies in arts and sciences from 1994 to 2001.

== Life and career ==
Sterling was born on April 16, 1943. In 1969, he founded what is now Communication Booknotes Quarterly and served on the editorial boards of several research journals (he edited what was then the Journal of Broadcasting for five years in the early 1970s). During the 1970s, he edited five series of facsimile reprints of 140 important early books in broadcasting and telecommunications for the New York Times' Arno Press, primarily for the library market. Sterling was the recipient of several awards, including being named IRTS Stanton Fellow and the Broadcast Education Association's Distinguished Scholar and Education Service awards. He served as BEA's president for two years in the 1980s.

After earning his academic degrees at the University of Wisconsin–Madison, Sterling taught at Temple University through the 1970s, then moved to Washington to serve as a special assistant to FCC Commissioner Ann Jones from 1980 to 1982. Sterling has testified before or done consulting for congressional committees, the Department of Justice's Antitrust Division, the Office of Management and Budget, the former U.S. Information Agency, and the Federal Communications Commission. He has lectured in Europe, South America, and Asia on American communication policy and appears frequently in both American and foreign media as an authority on electronic media and telecommunications issues.

Sterling also published articles about several of his avocations, including Sir Winston Churchill, the development of commercial aviation (including Commercial Air Transport Books: An Annotated Bibliography [1996] and a Supplement [1998]), ocean liners, and the history of fortification.

Christopher H. Sterling lived in northern Virginia. He died on July 1, 2023, at the age of 80.

== Bibliography ==
Electronic Media Books

- Biographical Encyclopedia of American Radio. Routledge, 2010 (editor, with Cary O'Dell)
- Concise Encyclopedia of American Radio. Routledge, 2009 (editor, with Cary O'Dell
- Encyclopedia of Journalism. Sage Reference. 2009 (editor, six vols.)
- Sounds of Change: A History of FM Broadcasting in America. University of North Carolina, 2008 (with Michael C. Keith)
- Rise of American Radio: An Historical Anthology. Routledge, 2007 (editor, six vols)
- Encyclopedia of Radio. Fitzroy-Dearborn/Routledge, 2004 (editor, three vols, with Michael C. Keith, consulting editor)
- Stay Tuned: A History of American Broadcasting. Lawrence Erlbaum, 2002 (3rd ed., with John Kittross; originally published in 1978)
- Focal Guide to Electronic Media. Focal Press, 1998 (CD-ROM, editor)
- Mass Communication Research Resources: An Annotated Guide. Lawrence Erlbaum, 1998 (with James K. Bracken and Susan M. Hill)
- Electronic Media: A Brief Survey of Broadcasting and Cable in the United States. International Center for Journalism, 1996
- Broadcasting in America: A Survey of Electronic Media: Brief Edition. Houghton Mifflin, 1991; 1996 [2nd Ed] (with Sidney Head and Lemuel B. Schofield)
- Broadcasting in America: A Survey of Electronic Media. Houghton Mifflin, 1994 (7th ed, senior co-author)
- Electronic Media: A Guide to Trends in Broadcasting and Newer Technologies, 1920-1983. Praeger, 1984.
- Who Owns the Media? Concentration of Ownership in the Mass Communication Industry. Knowledge Industry Publications, 1982 (2nd ed, one of three authors)
- The Mass Media: Aspen Institute Guide to Communication Industry Trends. Praeger, 1978 (with Timothy R. Haight)
- Mass News: Practices, Controversies, Alternatives. Prentice-Hall, 1973 (co-edited with David J. LeRoy)

Telecommunication Books

- Military Communications: From Ancient Times to the 21st Century. ABC-CLIO, 2007 (editor)
- Shaping American Telecommunications: A History of Technology, Policy, and Economics. Lawrence Erlbaum, 2006 (with Phyllis Brent and Martin Weiss)
- History of Telecommunications Technology: An Annotated Bibliography. Scarecrow Press, 2000 (with George Shiers)
- Telecommunication Research Resources: An Annotated Guide. Lawrence Erlbaum, 1995 (with James K. Bracken)
- Decision to Divest: The First Review (1985 to 1987). Broadcasting Publications, 1988 (editor with Jill F. Kasle)
- Decision to Divest: Major Documents in U.S. v. AT&T, 1974 to 1984. Communication Press, 1986 (editor with Jill F. Kasle and Katherine Glakas, three vols)
- International Telecommunications and Information Policy. Communications Press, 1984 (editor)
