= Coalition of the willing (Iraq War) =

Group of countries that supported the 2003 United States-led invasion of Iraq

The term coalition of the willing was applied to the Multi-National Force – Iraq, the military command during the 2003 invasion of Iraq and much of the ensuing Iraq War. The coalition of the willing was led by the United States.

The "Coalition of the willing" named by the White House in 2003

In November 2002, U.S. president George W. Bush, visiting Europe for a NATO summit, declared that "should Iraqi President Saddam Hussein choose not to disarm, the United States will lead a coalition of the willing to disarm him."

The Bush administration briefly used "coalition of the willing" to refer to the countries who supported, militarily or politically, the 2003 invasion of Iraq and subsequent military presence in post-invasion Iraq. The list released by the White House in March 2003 included 46 members. In April 2003, the list was updated to include 49 countries, though it was reduced to 48 after Costa Rica objected to its inclusion. Of the 48 countries on the list, four contributed troops to the invasion force (the United States, the United Kingdom, Australia and Poland). An additional 37 countries provided some number of troops to support military operations after the invasion was complete.

The list of coalition members provided by the White House included several nations that did not intend to participate in actual military operations. Some of them, such as Marshall Islands, Micronesia, Palau and Solomon Islands, did not have standing armies. However, through the Compact of Free Association, citizens of the Marshall Islands, Palau and the Federated States of Micronesia are allowed to serve in the US military. The members of these island nations have deployed in a combined Pacific force consisting of Guamanian, Hawaiian and Samoan reserve units. They have been deployed twice to Iraq. The government of one country, the Solomon Islands, listed by the White House as a member of the coalition, was apparently unaware of any such membership and promptly denied it. According to a 2010 study, the Federated States of Micronesia, the Marshall Islands and Palau (and Tonga and the Solomon Islands to a lesser extent) were all economically dependent on economic aid from the United States, and thus had an economic incentive to join the Coalition of the Willing.

In December 2008, University of Illinois professor Scott Althaus reported that he had learned that the White House was editing and back-dating revisions to the list of countries in the coalition. Althaus found that some versions of the list had been entirely removed from the record, and that others contradicted one another, as opposed to the procedure of archiving original documents and supplementing them with later revisions and updates.

By August 2009, all non-U.S./UK coalition members had withdrawn from Iraq. As a result, the Multinational Force – Iraq was renamed and reorganized to United States Forces – Iraq as of 1 January 2010. Thus the Coalition of the Willing came to an official end.

== List of countries ==
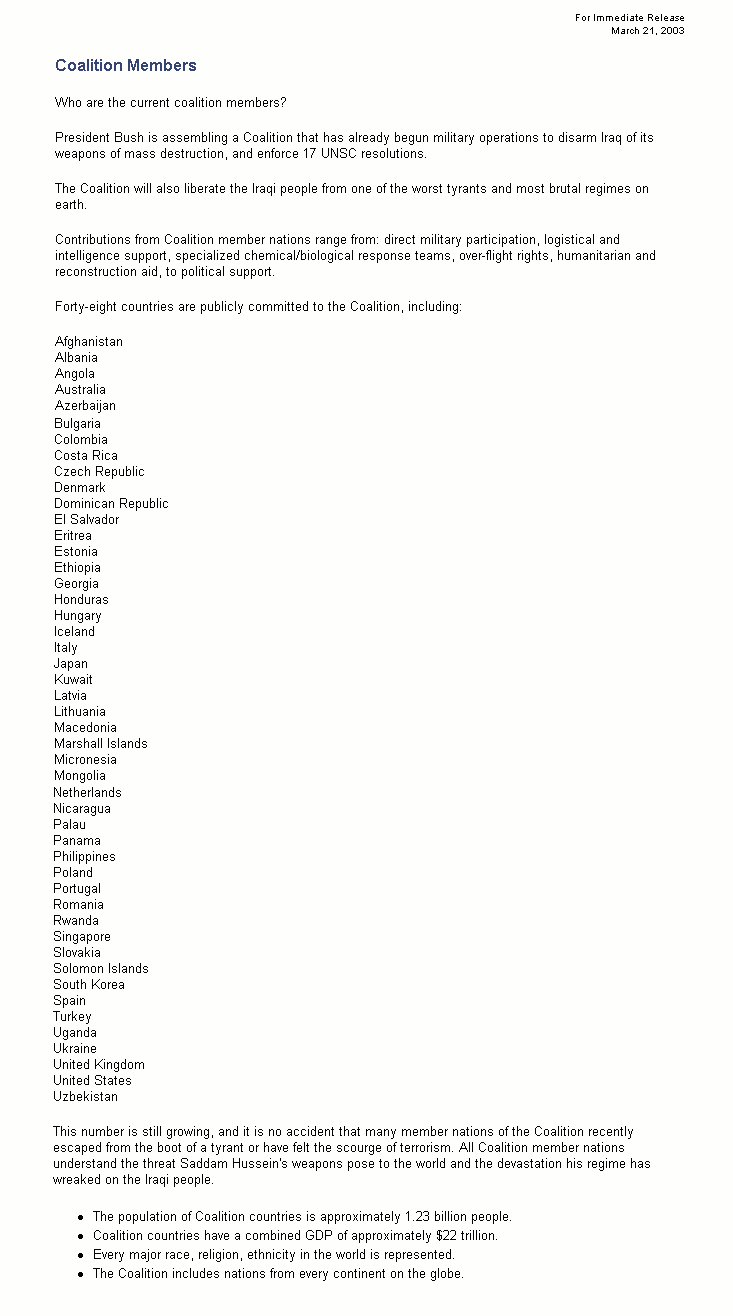
Original members

On 18 March 2003, the State Department made public a list of 32 countries that participated in the US-led coalition: Afghanistan, Albania, Australia, Azerbaijan, Bulgaria, Colombia, the Czech Republic, Denmark, El Salvador, Eritrea, Estonia, Ethiopia, Georgia, Hungary, Iceland, Italy, Japan, South Korea, Latvia, Lithuania, Macedonia, the Netherlands, Nicaragua, the Philippines, Poland, Romania, Slovakia, Spain, Turkey, the United Kingdom and Uzbekistan.

On 20 March 2003, the White House released a list with the following additions: Costa Rica, the Dominican Republic, Honduras, Kuwait, the Marshall Islands, Micronesia, Mongolia, Palau, Portugal, Rwanda, Singapore, Solomon Islands, Uganda. Panama was added to the list the next day. In April 2003, Angola, Tonga and Ukraine were included in the list, bringing the number of allied nations to 49 (including the United States). In October or November 2004, Costa Rica was dropped from the list, so that there were 48 nations left.

== Criticism of use ==
Specific uses of the phrase in the context of disarming Iraq began appearing in mid-2001.

Salon columnist Laura McClure, noting the large amounts of foreign aid being offered in exchange for supporting the Iraq War, referred to Bush's coalition as the "coalition of the billing". British activist Tariq Ali made a similar point, describing it as a "coalition of the shilling".

In the second debate in 2004 U.S. presidential election at the University of Miami, Democratic presidential candidate John Kerry questioned the size of the coalition participating in the initial invasion, saying, "...when we went in, there were three countries: Great Britain, Australia and the United States. That's not a grand coalition. We can do better". Bush responded by saying, "Well, actually, he forgot Poland. And now there're 30 nations involved, standing side by side with our American troops". The phrase "You forgot Poland" subsequently became a sarcastic shorthand for the perception that most members of the coalition were not contributing much to the war effort compared to the main three allies. The majority of the population in most countries involved did not, according to surveys, support the endeavour or their nation's participation.

Late U.S. Sen. Robert Byrd, then ranking Democrat on the Senate Appropriations Committee, referred to the coalition by the acronym COW, expressing his concern that the United States was being "milked" as a "cash cow". A Canadian Member of Parliament, Carolyn Parrish, referred to Canadian support for the U.S. national missile defense program as the "Coalition of the Idiots".

In the 2003 book Dude, Where's My Country?, Michael Moore argues that the very idea of a "coalition of the willing" was inaccurate. In making his case, Moore said that most of the countries contributing troops to the coalition were small countries with practically no economic clout, and that the countries' general populations opposed the invasion.

== See also ==
- Coalition of the Gulf War
- Multi-National Force – Iraq
- The letter of the eight
