= Walter Dodd =

Walter Dodd may refer to:

- Walter F. Dodd (1880–1960), professor of political science
- Walter J. Dodd (1869–1916), American physician and radiologist
