= Jessica Blatt =

American academic

Jessica Blatt is an American academic who studies American political history. She is the author of Race and the Making of American Political Science (2018).

Blatt teaches American politics, and does research on the history of American politics and the interaction of race, gender, and class with policy and discourse. She taught at Sarah Lawrence College, and has been with Marymount Manhattan College since 2010.

Race and the Making of American Political Science (U of Pennsylvania P, 2018) was widely and positively reviewed. Nick Dorzweiler, professor of history and gender studies, said the book was a "captivating, much-needed contribution to our understanding of the history of [American political science]". CUNY professor of history Sanford Schram called it a "thoroughly engrossing and provocative book", and Joy Rohde, professor of public policy at the University of Michigan, said it was "a welcome and important addition to the history of the social sciences and American political thought". The journal Perspectives on Politics thought the book important enough to "ask a range of leading political scientists to consider and respond to Professor Blatt’s important call for scholarly self-reflexivity".
