= Dianne Pinderhughes =

American political scientist

- Born: Dianne Marie Pinderhughes; June 21, 1947 (age 79)
- Education: University of Chicago (MA, PhD); Albertus Magnus College (BA)
- Occupation: Political scientist
- Employer: University of Notre Dame
- Website: http://wilsoncenter.org/staff/dianne-pinderhughes

Dianne Marie Pinderhughes (born 1947) is Full Professor in the Departments of Africana Studies and Political Science at the University of Notre Dame. In 2007 Pinderhughes became the first African-American woman president of the American Political Science Association. Since 2021 she is the president of the International Political Science Association, and she is the first African American and fifth woman to hold this position. She holds a B.A. from Albertus Magnus College and an M.A. and Ph.D. in Political Science from the University of Chicago. Pinderhughes sits on the editorial board of the Journal of Women, Politics & Policy. She was American Academy of Arts and Sciences Fellow of 2019.

== Selected bibliography ==
=== Books ===
- Pinderhughes, Dianne M. (1987). Race and ethnicity in Chicago politics: a reexamination of pluralist theory. Urbana: University of Illinois Press. ISBN 978-0-252-01294-5.
- Pinderhughes, Dianne M. (1991). Redistricting: The issues for blacks and hispanics (A media guide to Illinois remap). Urbana: University of Illinois Press.
- Pinderhughes, Dianne M. (2008), "Foreword", in Orr, Marion; Johnson, Varlerie C. (eds.), Power in the city: Clarence Stone and the politics of inequality, Lawrence: University Press of Kansas, pp. ix–xii, ISBN 978-0-7006-1573-5
- Pinderhughes, Dianne M. (2015). Black Politics after the Civil Rights Revolution (second ed.). Routledge. ISBN 978-0-415-88156-2.

== See also ==
- American Political Science Association
