= Ross M. Lence =

American political scientist (1943–2006)

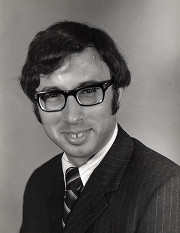
- Born: Ross Marlo Anthony Lence; December 19, 1943; Whitefish, Montana, US
- Died: July 11, 2006 (aged 62); Houston, Texas, US
- Occupation: Political scientist

Academic background
- Education: University of Chicago (BA); Indiana University Bloomington (PhD 1970)
- Doctoral advisor: Charles S. Hyneman

Academic work
- Discipline: Political science
- Institutions: University of Houston (1971–2006)

Ross Marlo Anthony Lence (December 19, 1943 – July 11, 2006) was an American political scientist. He was professor of political science at the University of Houston from 1971 to 2006, where he was John and Rebecca Moores Professor and then held the Ross M. Lence Distinguished Teaching Chair, named and endowed in his honor in 2001. He taught political philosophy, American political thought, and American government as a member of the political science and honors college faculties. He edited a Liberty Fund volume of the works of John C. Calhoun, Union and Liberty: The Political Philosophy of John C. Calhoun.

== Early life and education ==
Lence was born in Whitefish, Montana, on December 19, 1943. His father, Marlo, was a foreman on the Great Northern Railway; his mother, Nickie stayed home to raise Ross and his brother, John, before taking a job to run a photography studio. Ross graduated from Whitefish High School with a 4.0 GPA and was valedictorian of his class.

After completing his BA degree at the University of Chicago, in 1966 Ross studied at Georgetown University, then at Indiana University Bloomington under Charles S. Hyneman, who took Ross on a 15,000-mile, 5-year trip across America to give Ross first-hand experience of the country. He graduated from Indiana University in 1970 with a PhD. Before finishing his PhD at Indiana, in 1970, Ross researched at The British Museum.

== Career ==
Lence began teaching at the University of Houston in 1971, where he also served as director of undergraduate studies in the department of political science for 23 years. He was John and Rebecca Moores Scholar in 1998 and held the Ross M. Lence Distinguished Teaching Chair from 2001. He also taught for over twenty years at the Women's Institute of Houston. Throughout his career, Lence was a perennial participant, leader, and director at Liberty Fund Colloquia. He was a founding board member of the Abbeville Institute of Atlanta, Georgia, and lectured at its first summer school in 2003.

As a scholar, Ross published articles and edited books on American political thought. His article on Thomas Jefferson and the Declaration of Independence offered a deliberate, close reading of the Declaration as the key founding document in American political history. This article has been made accessible with permission. He edited a Liberty Fund volume of the works of John C. Calhoun, Union and Liberty: The Political Philosophy of John C. Calhoun.

== Death and legacy ==
Lence died on July 11, 2006, in Houston, Texas, after a bout with pancreatic cancer.

He was honored as the namesake of a named chair at the University of Houston in 2001. In January 2007, in memory of Lence, the college of liberal arts and social sciences at the University of Houston renamed its teaching excellence awards the Ross M. Lence Awards for Teaching Excellence, and he is also the namesake of the Lence Master Teacher Residency program at Houston.

== Selected works ==
- Union and Liberty: The Political Philosophy of John C. Calhoun. Liberty Fund, 1992.

== See also ==
- John C.Calhoun
- University of Houston
- Social Sciences
