= Charles O. Jones =

American political scientist (1931–2024)

- Born: October 28, 1931
- Died: January 3, 2024 (aged 92)

Charles Oscar Jones (October 28, 1931 – January 3, 2024) was an American political scientist who was a non-resident senior fellow at the Miller Center of Public Affairs at the University of Virginia. He was a graduate of the University of South Dakota and the University of Wisconsin–Madison. He was a fellow of the American Academy of Arts and Sciences and a Guggenheim fellow. He was a leading scholar of American politics. He was also a non-resident senior fellow in the Governmental Studies program at The Brookings Institution. Jones wrote or edited 18 books and contributed over 100 articles and book chapters. He died on January 3, 2024, at the age of 92.

== Academic career ==
Jones held a number of distinguished academic appointments, including:

- Professor of Political Science, University of Virginia
- Hawkins Professor of Political Science, University of Wisconsin–Madison
- Maurice Falk Professor of American Government, University of Pittsburgh
- John Olin Professor of American Government, Oxford University
- Non-resident senior fellow, Brookings Institution
- President, American Political Science Association
- President, Pi Sigma Alpha

== Scholarly focus ==
Jones wrote broadly on American politics, but his primary focus was on the relationship between Congress and the President. He wrote a number of influential books, including The Presidency in a Separated System and An Introduction to Public Policy.

== See also ==
- Harold Lasswell
