= Susan Stokes (political scientist) =

American political scientist

Susan Carol Stokes (born 1959) is an American political scientist and the Tiffany and Margaret Blake Distinguished Service Professor in the Political Science department of the University of Chicago, and the faculty director of the Chicago Center on Democracy. In September 2025, she began her term as the President of the American Political Science Association, having previously served as the Chair of the Democracy and Autocracy section of the American Political Science Association from September 2019 to September 2021. Her academic focus is on Latin American politics, comparative politics, and how democracies function in developing countries. Stokes is a member of the American Academy of Arts and Sciences. She was elected a member of the National Academy of Sciences in 2022.

== Education and career ==
Stokes studied anthropology for her bachelor's degree at Harvard-Radcliffe and master's degree at Stanford University. She received her PhD in political science from Stanford in 1988. Since then, she has held academic appointments at the University of Washington (1988–91), the University of Chicago (1991-2005; 2018–present), and Yale University (2005–18, including serving as the John S. Saden Professor and Chair of the Political Science Department 2009–14). Stokes’ work has been supported by research grants and fellowships from the National Science Foundation (1997–99, 2003–05), the Guggenheim Memorial Foundation (2003–04), the MacArthur Foundation (1990–94), the Fulbright Program (1981–82, 1985–86), the American Philosophical Society (1999-2000), and the Russell Sage Foundation (2014-15). She teaches courses on political development, political parties and democracy, comparative political behavior, and distributive politics.

== Family ==
Stokes is married to Steven Pincus and has three sons (David, Andrew, and Sam).

== Organizations ==
=== Bright Line Watch ===
In 2016, Stokes co-founded Bright Line Watch, an initiative to monitor the strength of U.S. democracy, The initiative conducts ongoing sets of surveys of political scientists and the general public in the United States to assess views of U.S. democratic performance.

=== Chicago Center on Democracy ===
Stokes founded the Chicago Center on Democracy—based at the University of Chicago—in 2018, and serves as its faculty director. The center's focus is on research, public engagement, and expanding public understanding of how democracies function.

== Publications ==
=== Recent academic articles in refereed journals ===
- “Why is Participation Low in Referendums? Lessons from Latin America,” with Eli Rau and Radha Sarkar. Latin American Research Review, 1-23, doi:10.1017/lar.2024.74, 2025.
- “Building Tolerance for Backsliding by Trash Talking Democracy: Theory and Evidence from Mexico,” with Lautaro Cella, Ipek Çınar, and Andres Uribe. Comparative Political Studies 0(0): 1–28. doi.org/10.1177/00104140251328, 2025.
- “Income Inequality and the Erosion of Democracy in the Twenty-First Century,” with Eli Rau. Proceedings of the National Academy of Sciences, 122(1). doi.org/10.1073/pnas.2422543121, 2024.
- “The Effect of Electoral Inversions on Democratic Legitimacy: Evidence from the United States,” with John M. Carey, Gretchen Helmke, Brendan Nyhan, Mitchell Sanders, and Shun Yamaya. British Journal of Political Science 52: 1891–1901. doi:10.1017/S000712342100048X, 2022.
- “Who will defend democracy? Evaluating tradeoffs in candidate support among partisan donors and voters,” with John Carey, Katherine Clayton, Gretchen Helmke, Brendan Nyhan, and Mitchell Sanders. Journal of Elections, Public Opinion, and Parties 32(1): 230-245. doi: 10.1080/17457289.2020.1790577, 2022.
- “Presidential Rhetoric and Populism,” with Ipek Çinar and Andres Uribe. Presidential Studies Quarterly 50(2): 240–263. doi: 10.1111/psq.12656, 2020.
- "Searching for a Bright Line in the Trump Presidency," with John M. Carey, Gretchen Helmke, Brendan Nyhan, and Mitchell Sanders. Perspectives on Politics, 17(3): 699-718. doi:10.1017/S153759271900001X, 2019.
- “Beyond Opportunity Costs: Campaign Messages, Anger, and Turnout among the Unemployed,” with S. Erdem Aytaç and Eli G. Rau. British Journal of Political Science. doi:10.1017/S0007123418000248, 2018.
- "Accountability for Realists." Critical Review 30(1-2):130-138. doi:10.1080/08913811.2018.1473111, 2018.
- "Beyond Opportunity Costs: Campaign Messages, Anger, and Turnout Among the Unemployed," with Erdem Aytaç and Eli Rau. British Journal of Political Science. 50(4): 1325-1339. doi:10.1017/S0007123418000248, 2018.
- "When do the Wealthy Support Redistribution? Inequality Aversion in Buenos Aires," with Germán Feierherd and Luis Schiumerini, British Journal of Political Science, 50: 793-805. doi:10.1017/S0007123417000588, 2017.
- "Why do People Join Backlash Movements? Lessons from Turkey," with Erdem Aytaç and Luis Schiumerini, Journal of Conflict Resolution 62(6):1205-1228. doi: 10.1177/002200271668682, 2017.
- "Protests and Repression in New Democracies," with Erdem Aytaç and Luis Schiumerini, Perspectives on Politics 15(1): 62-82. doi:10.1017/S1537592716004138, 2017.

=== Books ===
- Stokes, Susan C. (2025-09-09). The Backsliders: Why Leaders Undermine Their Own Democracies. Princeton University Press, Princeton (US). ISBN 978-0691271545 (hardback).
- Stokes, Susan C.; Aytaç, S. Erdem (2019-01-31). Why Bother?: Rethinking Participation in Elections and Protests. Cambridge University Press, Cambridge (UK). ISBN 978-1-108-47522-8 (hardback) and ISBN 978-1-108-46594-6 (paperback).
- Stokes, Susan C.; Dunning, Thad; Nazareno, Marcelo; Brusco, Valeria (2013-09-30). Brokers, Voters, and Clientelism: The Puzzle of Distributive Politics. Cambridge University Press, New York. ISBN 978-1-107-04220-9 (hardback), ISBN 978-1-107-66039-7 (paperback).
- Shapiro, Ian; Stokes, Susan C.; Wood, Elizabeth Jean; Kirshner, Alexander S. (2010-01-14). Political Representation. Cambridge University Press, Cambridge (UK). ISBN 978-0-521-11127-0 (hardback) and 978-0-521-12865-0 (paperback).
- Levi, Margaret; Johnson, James; Knight, Jack; Stokes, Susan (2008-09-04). Designing Democratic Government: Making Institutions Work. Russell Sage Foundation, New York. ISBN 978-0-87154-518-3.
- Boix, Carles; Stokes, Susan Carol (2007). The Oxford Handbook of Comparative Politics. Oxford University Press, Oxford (UK). ISBN 978-0-19-927848-0.
- Cleary, Matthew R.; Stokes, Susan (2006-01-12). Democracy and the Culture of Skepticism: The Politics of Trust in Argentina and Mexico. Russell Sage Foundation, New York. ISBN 0-87154-166-1.
- Stokes, Susan C. (2001-08-03). Mandates and Democracy: Neoliberalism by Surprise in Latin America. Cambridge University Press, Cambridge (UK). ISBN 0-521-80118-4 (hardback) and ISBN 0-521-80511-2 (paperback).
- Stokes, Susan C. (1995-05-01). Cultures in Conflict: Social Movements and the State in Peru. University of California Press, Berkeley, Cal. ISBN 0-520-20023-3.
- Przeworski, Adam; Stokes, Susan C.; Manin, Bernard (1999-09-13). Democracy, Accountability, and Representation. Cambridge University Press, Cambridge (UK). ISBN 0-521-64153-5 (hardback) and 0-521-64616-2 (paperback).
- Stokes, Susan C. (2001-09-17). Public Support for Market Reforms in New Democracies. Cambridge University Press, Cambridge (UK). ISBN 9781139175234.
