= Charles S. Hyneman =

American political scientist (1900–1985)

- Born: May 5, 1900; Gibson County, Indiana, U.S.
- Died: January 20, 1985 (aged 84); Bloomington, Indiana, U.S.
- Occupation: Political scientist

Academic background
- Education: Indiana University (BA 1923; MA 1925); University of Illinois (PhD 1929)

Academic work
- Discipline: Political science
- Institutions: University of Illinois (1930–1937); Louisiana State University (1937–1941); Northwestern University (1947–1956); Indiana University Bloomington (1956–1971)

Charles S. Hyneman (May 5, 1900 – January 20, 1985), was an American political scientist who served as the president of the American Political Science Association from 1961 to 1962. At that time, he was a distinguished professor at Indiana University Bloomington. He participated in practical municipal government and World War II war work as well as political science.

== Early life and education ==
Hyneman was born on May 5, 1900, in Gibson County, Indiana. Hyneman received his bachelor's degree in 1923 and his master's degree in 1925 from Indiana University and his Ph.D. from the University of Illinois in 1929.

== Career ==
From 1928 to 1930, he was a lecturer in political science at Syracuse University before returning to the University of Illinois as an assistant professor from 1930 to 1937. He then became a professor and chair of the department of government at Louisiana State University in 1937. While at LSU, he organized the Louisiana Municipal Association and a merit system for the state government employees.

During World War II, Hyneman held multiple government positions. He worked in the Bureau of the Budget, as a chief of the training branch of the War Department, and in the Federal Communications Commission (FCC). In the FCC, he directed the Foreign Broadcast Intelligence Service and later assisted the chairman and served as executive officer.

In 1947, Hyneman returned to academia to become a professor at Northwestern University. In Chicago, he worked with the Chicago Sanitary Board and became familiar with the Daley machine. In 1956, he moved to his alma mater Indiana University Bloomington, where he was appointed distinguished professor in 1961 and retired emeritus in 1971. His students at Indiana University included Ross M. Lence (PhD 1970).

He drew on his wartime experience to argue for disciplinary reform, leading a "behavioral revolution" in political science that he expressed in his 1959 book The Study of Politics. He advocated for more extensive quantitative data for political science, and contributed his own example with Voting in Indiana (1980). He served as the president of the American Political Science Association from 1961 to 1962.

== Death and legacy ==
Hyneman died on January 20, 1985, in Bloomington, Indiana.

He was made the namesake of a named chair professorship at Indiana University in 2026.

== Selected works ==
- Edited, with Donald S. Lutz: American Political Writing During the Founding Era: 1760-1805. Liberty Fund 1983.
- With C. Richard Hofstetter and Patrick F. O'Connor: Voting in Indiana. Indiana University Press 1980.
- The Supreme Court on Trial. Atherton Press, New York 1963.
- The Study of Politics. The Present State of American Political Science. University of Illinois Press, Urbana 1959.
- Bureaucracy in a Democracy. Harper 1950.
- The First American Neutrality. The University of Illinois, Urbana 1934.
