= Steven Pincus =

American historian

Steven Pincus is the Thomas E. Donnelly Professor of British History at the University of Chicago, where he specializes in seventeenth- and eighteenth-century British and European history.

== Education and career ==
In 1990, Pincus received a PhD in history from Harvard University. He is a prominent scholar of Early Modern British history, and his work has focused on the 17th century, in particular the Glorious Revolution and English foreign policy. His book 1688: The First Modern Revolution has been praised as providing "a new understanding of the origins of the modern, liberal state." The Economist named it as one of the best books on history published in 2009. Professor Mark Knights called it "brilliant and provocative," for Pincus argues the revolution of 1688 was the first modern revolution. 1688 was violent and divisive; it represented not a coup or invasion but a popular rejection of the king's absolutist modernisation based on the French Catholic model. The Revolution, Pincus argues, expressed an Anglo-Dutch emphasis on consent of the governed, toleration of different forms of Protestantism, free debate and free commerce. Other reviews were more negative, however. Professor Grant Tapsell of Oxford University said it was "fundamentally flawed in three ways: the argument is most implausible where it is most novel; the evidence used to make the argument is mishandled; and much of the book involves reinventing the wheel due to a bizarrely patchy engagement with existing scholarly literature."

Pincus has proposed a theory of revolution that is based on opposing forces of modernization. In his telling, revolutions occur when a state embarks on a strong modernization program, and as a result of the state's attempts to modernize, divergent revolutionary forces form in order to provide alternative routes towards modernization. In contrast to most theories that seek to explain the origins of revolutions, Pincus argues that "state modernization is a necessary prerequisite to revolution" because state modernization "necessarily brings a huge swath of people into contact with the state" which "encourages those for whom national politics was previously distant and largely unimportant to care deeply about the state's ideological and political direction." Additionally, Pincus argues that, in order to implement their programs of reform, modernizing states "have to proclaim and explain their new direction" to these "new publics." By dramatically expanding the reach of the state and creating an ideological justification for this expansion, Pincus claims that modernizing states enable revolutions to take shape where no revolution could have previously formed.

Pincus has argued that the British Empire should be understood as a "global actor" with "partisan politics that spanned the empire" rather than a set of distinct regions.

In March 2010 he delivered the Sir John Neale lecture at University College London. He was in Oxford for the 2010–2011 academic year working on the origins of the British Empire.

== Family ==
Pincus is married to Susan Stokes and has three sons (David, Andrew, and Sam).

== Titles and positions ==
- 1993–2005 – Professor of History, University of Chicago
- 2005–2018 – Bradford Durfee Professor of History, Yale University
- 2018–present – Thomas E. Donnelly Professor of British History, University of Chicago

== Selected works ==
- "Popery, Trade and Universal Monarchy: the ideological context of the outbreak of the Second Anglo-Dutch War." English Historical Review (1992): 1-29. in JSTOR
- "Republicanism, Absolutism, and Universal Monarchy: English Popular Sentiment During the Third Dutch War." in Culture and Society in the Stuart Restoration: Literature, Drama, History, ed. Gerald MacLean (Cambridge, 1995) (1995): 258–9.
- "'Coffee Politicians Does Create': Coffeehouses and Restoration Political Culture," The Journal of Modern History Vol. 67, No. 4, December 1995.
- "From butterboxes to wooden shoes: the shift in English popular sentiment from anti-Dutch to anti-French in the 1670s." The Historical Journal 38.2 (1995): 333–361.
- "The English debate over universal monarchy." A union for empire: political thought and the British Union of 1707 (1995): 37–62.
- "'To protect English liberties': The English Nationalist Revolution of 1688-1689." in Protestantism and national identity: Britain and Ireland (1998): 75–104.
- "The Making of a Great Power? Universal Monarchy, Political Economy, and the Transformation of English Political Culture." The European Legacy 5.4 (2000): 531–545.
- with Peter Lake. "Rethinking the public sphere in early modern England." Journal of British Studies 45.2 (2006): 270–292
- with James A. Robinson. "What really happened during the Glorious Revolution?" No. w17206. National Bureau of Economic Research, 2011. online
- Pincus, Steven. "A Fight for the Future." History Today 59.10 (2009): 10+

=== Books ===
- Protestantism and Patriotism: Ideologies and the Making of English Foreign Policy, 1650-1668 (Cambridge: Cambridge University Press, 1996)
- A Nation Transformed: England after the Restoration (edited with Alan Houston) (Cambridge: Cambridge University Press, 2001)
- England's Glorious Revolution: A Brief History with Documents (New York: Palgrave Macmillan, 2006)
- The Politics of the Public Sphere in Early Modern England (edited with Peter Lake) (Manchester: Manchester University Press, 2007)
- 1688: The First Modern Revolution (New Haven: Yale University Press, 2009)
- The Heart of the Declaration: The Founders' Case for an Activist Government (New Haven: Yale University Press, 2016)
