= North American Society for Social Philosophy =

The North American Society for Social Philosophy (NASSP) is a non-profit learned society whose mission is to facilitate discussion between social philosophers on all topics of interest. Established in 1984, NASSP sponsors a peer reviewed journal, the Journal of Social Philosophy, hosts the International Social Philosophy Conference, produces a conference book series, and publishes a newsletter. NASSP also sponsors an annual award for the best new book on social philosophy, and organizes sessions in conjunction with meetings of the American Philosophical Association and the Canadian Philosophical Association. NASSP members receive the journal, the newsletter and the current volume of the book series as benefits of membership.

== Publications ==
- Journal of Social Philosophy (Wiley)
- Social Philosophy Today book series (Philosophy Documentation Center)
- North American Society for Social Philosophy Newsletter

== Annual meetings ==
The International Social Philosophy Conference is held each year in a different location, provides a space for the sharing of professional work in social philosophy, broadly conceived. Themes for the conference range from the sociological to the ethical to the political (and the economic and legal). A selection of papers presented at each meetings is subsequently prepared for publication in the conference series Social Philosophy Today.

=== Conferences themes and locations ===
- 2015 - 32nd Conference: "Education and Justice" (William Jewell College - Liberty, MO)
- 2014 - 31st Conference: "Power, Protest, and the Future of Democracy" (Southern Oregon University - Ashland, OR)
- 2013 - 30th Conference: "Food" (Quinnipiac University - Hamden, CT)
- 2012 - 29th Conference: "Civic Virtues, Divided Societies, and Democratic Dilemmas" (Northeastern University - Boston, MA)
- 2011 - 28th Conference: "Freedom, Religion, and Gender" (Marquette University - Milwaukee, WI)
- 2010 - 27th Conference: "Poverty, Markets, and Justice" (Ryerson University - Toronto, ON, Canada)
- 2009 - 26th Conference: "The Public and the Private in the 21st Century" (St. Joseph’s University - Philadelphia, PA)
- 2008 - 25th Conference: "Gender, Equality, and Social Justice" (University of Portland - Portland, OR)
- 2007 - 24th Conference: "Race and Diversity in the Global Context" (Millersville University - Millersville, PA)
- 2006 - 23rd Conference: "International Law and Justice" (Villanova University - Villanova, PA)
- 2005 - 22nd Conference: "Science, Technology, and Social Justice" (Rensselaer Polytechnic Institute - Troy, NY)
- 2004 - 21st Conference: "Human Rights, Religion, and Democracy"
- 2003 - 20th Conference: "War and Terrorism"
- 2002 - 19th Conference: "Environmental Philosophy as Social Philosophy"
- 2001 - 18th Conference: "Truth and Objectivity in Social Ethics"
- 2000 - 17th Conference: "Communication, Conflict, and Reconciliation"
- 1999 - 16th Conference: "Race, Social Identity, and Human Dignity"
- 1998 - 15th Conference: "Cultural Integrity and World Community"
