= Emmette Redford =

American political scientist

Emmette Redford (September 23, 1904 – January 30, 1998) was an American political scientist.

== Biography ==
He attended Midland College, Midland, Texas and Southwest Texas State Teachers College (now Texas State University), finally graduating from The University of Texas at Austin. He received a Ph.D. in government from Harvard in 1933. He was born in San Antonio, Texas. He grew up in Johnson City, Texas at the same time as Lyndon B. Johnson, and Redford and Johnson knew each other when they were children.

During World War II, he worked for four years in the Office of Price Administration.

He became a full professor at the University of Texas in 1939 and the Ashbel Smith Professor of Government in 1963. When the Lyndon B. Johnson School of Public Affairs was founded, he became the Ashbel Smith Professor of Government and Public Affairs in 1970. Redford was a President of the American Political Science Association.

He edited a 13-volume history of the Lyndon B. Johnson Administration.

== Publications ==
- Democracy in the Administrative State
- American Government and the Economy
