= Carol C. Gould =

American philosopher

Education
- Education: University of Chicago (BA), Yale University (M.Phil, PhD)

Philosophical work
- Era: 20th-/21st-century philosophy
- Region: Western philosophy
- School: Political philosophy, social philosophy, critical theory, feminist philosophy
- Main interests: Democratic theory, human rights, feminism, social ontology
- Notable ideas: Equal positive freedom, Concrete Universality, Transnational Solidarity

Carol C. Gould is an American philosopher and feminist theorist. Since 2009, she has taught at City University of New York, where she is currently Distinguished Professor of Philosophy at Hunter College, and in the Doctoral Programs of Philosophy and Political Science at the CUNY Graduate Center, where she is Director of the Center for Global Ethics and Politics at the Ralph Bunche Institute. Gould is also editor-in-chief of the Journal of Social Philosophy. Her 2004 book Globalizing Democracy and Human Rights received the 2009 David Easton Award which is given by the American Political Science Association "for a book that broadens the horizons of contemporary political science." Her 2014 book Interactive Democracy: The Social Roots of Global Justice received the 2015 Joseph B. Gittler Award from the American Philosophical Association for "an outstanding scholarly contribution in the field of the philosophy of one or more of the social sciences."

== Biography ==
Carol Gould grew up in New York City, on Manhattan’s Upper West Side. Her mother, Evelyn Gould, emigrated from Ukraine and became a NYC high school teacher for homebound students. Her father, Morris Minkus, was descended from the Seer of Lublin, and published several Yiddish plays in Poland before emigrating to the US and becoming a stamp dealer. Carol Gould attended the Ramaz School, then the University of Chicago, where she studied philosophy and psychology, graduating early with a degree in “The Analysis of Ideas and the Study of Methods." She studied with Hannah Arendt, Richard McKeon, and other illustrious professors, and took part in early anti-war demonstrations there, which helped turn her interest toward political philosophy. Gould subsequently received her MPhil and PhD degrees in philosophy from Yale University. She was active in the social movements of the day, including in early feminist “consciousness-raising” groups.

Gould has taught philosophy and political science at a number of colleges and universities, including the State University of New York at New Paltz, Lehman College of the City University of New York, Swarthmore College, the University of Pittsburgh, Stevens Institute of Technology (where she was Principal Investigator on a National Science Foundation grant on the ethical and social implications of computer networking), Columbia University’s School of International and Public Affairs, Temple University, George Mason University, (where she founded the Center for Global Ethics), and finally at Hunter College and the Graduate Center of the City University of New York. Gould was awarded a Rockefeller Foundation Humanities Fellowship, two fellowships from the National Endowment for the Humanities, and two Fulbright fellowships: a Senior Scholar Award to Paris, France, and the Fulbright Distinguished Chair (the Florence Chair) at the European University Institute. She also held residencies at the Woodrow Wilson International Center for Scholars and at the Institute for Advanced Study in Princeton, New Jersey. She has been a senior scholar at the Center for Humans and Nature and was a distinguished visiting professor of the Indian Philosophical Society. Gould has been editor of the Journal of Social Philosophy since 2004.

== Philosophical Work ==
Gould's works cover political philosophy (e.g. democratic theory), the philosophy of human rights, social theory, and feminist philosophy.

With Marx Wartofsky, Gould edited a collection entitled Women and Philosophy: Towards a Theory of Liberation (G. P. Putnam’s Press, 1976, reprinted from a special issue of The Philosophical Forum, 1973–74), which is credited with helping to popularize feminism in academic philosophy. In her lead article entitled “The Woman Question: Philosophy of Liberation and the Liberation of Philosophy,” Gould argued against traditional “abstract universalist” or essentialist perspectives which focus on human nature as such and proposed an alternative socially-grounded approach that incorporates social and historically constructed differences, which she called “concrete universality.”

Gould's book Marx's Social Ontology (MIT Press, 1978) was an early formulation of the project of social ontology, a philosophical subfield which has since grown substantially. Drawing on an interpretation of Karl Marx's middle work Grundrisse, Gould developed a distinctive approach to understanding the basic entities of social life, which she called "individuals-in-relations," replacing the "atomistic individualism" prevalent in liberal political thought. She argued that Marxian philosophy combined Aristotelian elements with Hegelian ones, and that the Grundrisse provides an essential connection between his early theories of alienation and the later political economy, in a book which amounts to "a philosophical reconstruction of Marx's entire system."

In a second collection on feminist philosophy, Beyond Domination: New Perspectives on Women and Philosophy (1984), Gould argued for what she called “political androgyny,” in which a polity could usefully combine historically “male” and “female” characteristics, rather than defining the public sphere in traditional masculinist terms that exclude care and supportiveness, traits historically identified with women. Gould proposed a similar openness to self-definition in personal life to incorporate the possibility of androgyny and other diverse expressions of gender and sexuality. Gould, along with other thinkers such as Claudia Card, Marilyn Friedman, and Martha Nussbaum, link the ideal of androgynous society to other social and political desiderata such as democratic equality and socialist justice.

In Rethinking Democracy: Freedom and Social Cooperation in Politics, Economy, and Society (1988), Gould argued for a norm of positive freedom as an important supplement to traditional negative liberty (as freedom from external interference, especially from the state), in a theory “incorporating the strengths and rejecting the basic deficiencies in liberal (negative) conceptions of freedom, while avoiding the authoritarian impulses that Berlin and others have argued necessarily follow in the wake of positive theories of freedom.” For Gould, positive freedom presupposes free choice but goes beyond it to the self-development of an individual’s capacities and projects over time, which requires access to material, social, and economic conditions. These include not only the “negative” civil liberties and political rights, but also freedom from oppression and domination, as well as enabling or “positive” economic and social rights. Gould argued that individuals as agents have equal rights of access to these conditions--“equal positive freedom”--which she presented as an alternative principle of justice to the then dominant views of Rawls and Nozick. The free expression of individual agency in turn requires opportunities to take part in decision making about “common activities” and to co-determine with others the direction of those collective activities, that is, a right to democratic participation. Since these activities are broader than just politics, Gould holds that democracy should be extended to economic institutions, in forms of workplace democracy or self-managing firms or enterprises. Gould's democratic theory based on equal positive freedom thus aims to show the compatibility of the apparently conflicting values of individual freedom on the one hand and social cooperation and equality on the other.

Writing in the Times Literary Supplement, the political philosopher Maurice Cranston commented that "Like Tocqueville, who attributed the success of democracy in America in part to the character of the Americans—and especially American women—Dr Gould maintains that the citizens of a democratic State must have “democratic personalities" including what can only be described as democratic virtues." These include, for her, a "disposition to reciprocity" and "active citizenship in association with others." Despite expressing reservations about the practicability of her proposed extension of democracy to social and economic life, Cranston concludes that "no reader can fail to be impressed with the intellectual rigour of her presentation and the charm of her style."

Gould's edited collection The Information Web (1989) was one of the first to take up the ethical and social implications of the newly emerging Internet, growing out of a collaborative NSF research grant on that theme that she led at Stevens Institute of Technology. Her article in that book, entitled "Network Ethics: Access, Consent, and The Informed Community,” proposed a principle of maximally free and open access to information, consistent with the right to privacy, as indicated by informed consent. More recently, she elaborated her approach in her 2014 book Interactive Democracy in a discussion of what she called “emancipatory networking" and in an article "How Democracy can Inform Consent: Cases of the Internet and Bioethics.”

In Social Justice and the Limitation of Democracy, she elaborated her understanding of democratic political structures as grounded in an ideal of liberty understood as the equal right to self-development and considered when democratic decisions could be constrained by norms of justice. Her book Globalizing Democracy and Human Rights (Cambridge University Press, 2004) took up this and other hard questions in democratic theory, including how democracy could extend beyond nation-states to transnational and even global contexts. She articulated the fundamental conditions for positive freedom in terms of human rights, interpreting these as not only legal rights but also as social and moral demands that people have on each other, which require the creation of institutions to meet basic material needs and needs for social recognition, along with relational needs for care, nurturance, and education. At base remains her “individuals-in-relations” ontology, which sees individuals as partly constituted by their relations with others, but where they have the ability to choose and change these relations, either individually or together with others. Gould proposed seeing universalist norms like human rights as “intersociative," in which they remain open to diverse cultural interpretations, while retaining their critical edge, appealing to a conception of concrete universality, which provides “a constructivist approach that is neither an endorsement of the local practice nor an imposition of an alien value.” Yet, in seeking intercultural deliberation and dialogue, the question of "Who speaks for a culture?" remains important, since representations of a given culture by privileged individuals may often prioritize their own narrow interests at the expense of those within that culture who are less privileged. Gould also argued that care, empathy, and reciprocity in social relationships are important for strengthening democracy, both within nation-states and as it extends through diverse social and cultural contexts to a transnational or even global level. Confronting the issue of the "democratic deficit" in globalization, she proposed a requirement for "democratic input" (although not fully equal rights of participation) from people whose human rights are affected by the decisions of powerful actors, whether nation-states, corporations, or global institutions. She also described how new forms of solidarity can help to achieve justice and can address the persistence of exploitation and the concentration of wealth in processes economic globalization.

Gould's analysis of transnational solidarity (2007) elaborated her networking conception of solidarity, modeled on social movements and civil society organizations working to eliminate oppression or suffering, especially across borders. In contrast to unitary models of solidarity within small groups or nation-states, this looser form involves actions between groups oriented to mutual aid or support and requires deference to those the groups are trying to assist.

In her fourth book, Interactive Democracy: The Social Roots of Global Justice (Cambridge University Press, 2014), Gould attempted to integrate the norms of democracy, justice, freedom, care, and solidarity, arguing that the tendency of political philosophy to treat them separately unnecessarily limits the insights that can be gleaned by exploring their interactions. She developed her theory of human rights and its application to achieving economic justice in global contexts, and argued for a human right to democracy, understood as having a wide scope. The book explained how positive freedom goes beyond standard views of autonomy in incorporating a biographical dimension of growth or development over time. Other themes included the role of social movements in achieving social and economic justice, the possibilities of empathy and solidarity across borders, the problem of gender inequalities in diverse cultures, new ways of carrying out democratic deliberation online, and ways of structuring the institutions of global governance.

Gould’s conception of human rights as involving not only legal but also social and moral claims coheres with feminist approaches that extend rights to the private sphere and the ways they depend on practices of care and solidarity. Real democracy, for Gould, "reflects a conception of persons as social, networked, deliberative, engaged, and self-transformative. The political structures and modes of interaction within which we live must be equally deliberative and dynamic—they too must be interactive. And it is this conception of democracy as a multilayered, varied, dynamic, networked practice of political, economic, and social activity among diverse people at the local, national, transnational, and global levels that sets Interactive Democracy apart from other contributions to democratic theory and social philosophy." According to the Italian international relations theorist Daniele Archibugi, the book poses a challenge to contemporary political theory and practice, which holds that democracy applies to nation-states, rather than also to smaller communities (e.g., firms, or even families) or to institutions beyond the state such as regions or the UN. Globalization has made many boundaries irrelevant, and generated interdependences in economies, migration, climate change and technologies. Since many active human communities no longer coincide with states, and many issues escape control of particular governments, Gould argues for a necessary expansion of the scope of democracy. At the same time, the understanding of democracy as a norm would also have to be enriched. The political theorist Sanford Schram writes that for Gould "Democracy is embedded in social relations that work to realize social justice and vice versa. The art of separating politics from the rest of society needs to be questioned at a fundamental level and on a global scale."

In recent years, Gould has written articles on solidarity in healthcare, on labor rights as human rights, on democratic self-management in firms, and on the meaning of structural injustice and its implications for social and political responsibility. In addition to her substantive contributions, she is known for her use of a dialectical methodology in philosophy, building upon and synthesizing a wide variety of approaches, from liberal thought to critical social theory, as well as for bringing feminist concepts including care, empathy, and women's human rights into the realm of mainstream political philosophy and international ethics.

Gould has been active in the professions of philosophy and political science. She was President of the American Section of the International Society for Philosophy of Law and Social Philosophy and of the American Society for Value Inquiry, as well as of the Human Rights Section of the American Political Science Association. In the American Philosophical Association, she served as Chair of the Committee on Lectures, Publications, and Research, a Member-at-Large of its Board of Officers, and a member of its Committees on the Status of Women, the Status and Future of the Profession, International Cooperation, and the Defense of the Professional Rights of Philosophers. She also was Chair of the Association of Philosophy Journal Editors.

Gould's fellowships and grants include a Rockefeller Foundation Humanities Fellowship (1978–79), a National Endowment for the Humanities Fellowship for College Teachers (1993), a Fulbright Senior Scholar Award to France (1993–94), a Fulbright Distinguished Chair Professorship in Florence (2000), a Woodrow Wilson International Center for Scholars Fellowship (2001), and Membership at the Institute for Advanced Study (2015–16). She also was Principal Investigator on an NSF Grant on Ethics and Values in Science and Technology (1985–87).

== Books ==
=== Author ===
- Marx's Social Ontology: Individuality and Community in Marx's Theory of Social Reality (1978)
- Rethinking Democracy: Freedom and Social Cooperation in Politics, Economy, and Society (1988)
- Globalizing Democracy and Human Rights (2004)
- Interactive Democracy: The Social Roots of Global Justice (2014)

=== Editor ===
- with Marx W. Wartofsky: Women and Philosophy: Toward a Theory of Liberation. New York: G.P. Putnam's Sons, 1976. (Reprinted from Special Issue, The Philosophical Forum, Vol. V, nos. 1–2 [fall-winter, 1973–74], with a new introduction.)
- Beyond Domination: New Perspectives on Women and Philosophy. Totowa, NJ: Rowman and Littlefield, 1984.
- The Information Web: Ethical and Social Implications of Computer Networking. Boulder: Westview Press, 1989.
- with Robert S. Cohen: Artifacts, Representations, and Social Practice: Essays for Marx W. Wartofsky. Dordrecht: Kluwer Academic Publishers, 1994.
- Gender. Series: Key Concepts in Critical Theory. Amherst, NY: Prometheus Books/Humanity, 1999.
- with Pasquale Pasquino: Cultural Identity and the Nation-State. Lanham, MD: Rowman and Littlefield, 2001.
- Constructivism and Practice: Toward a Historical Epistemology. Lanham, MD: Rowman & Littlefield, 2003. [7]
