= Wendy Pearlman =

American Historian and Political Scientist of the Middle East

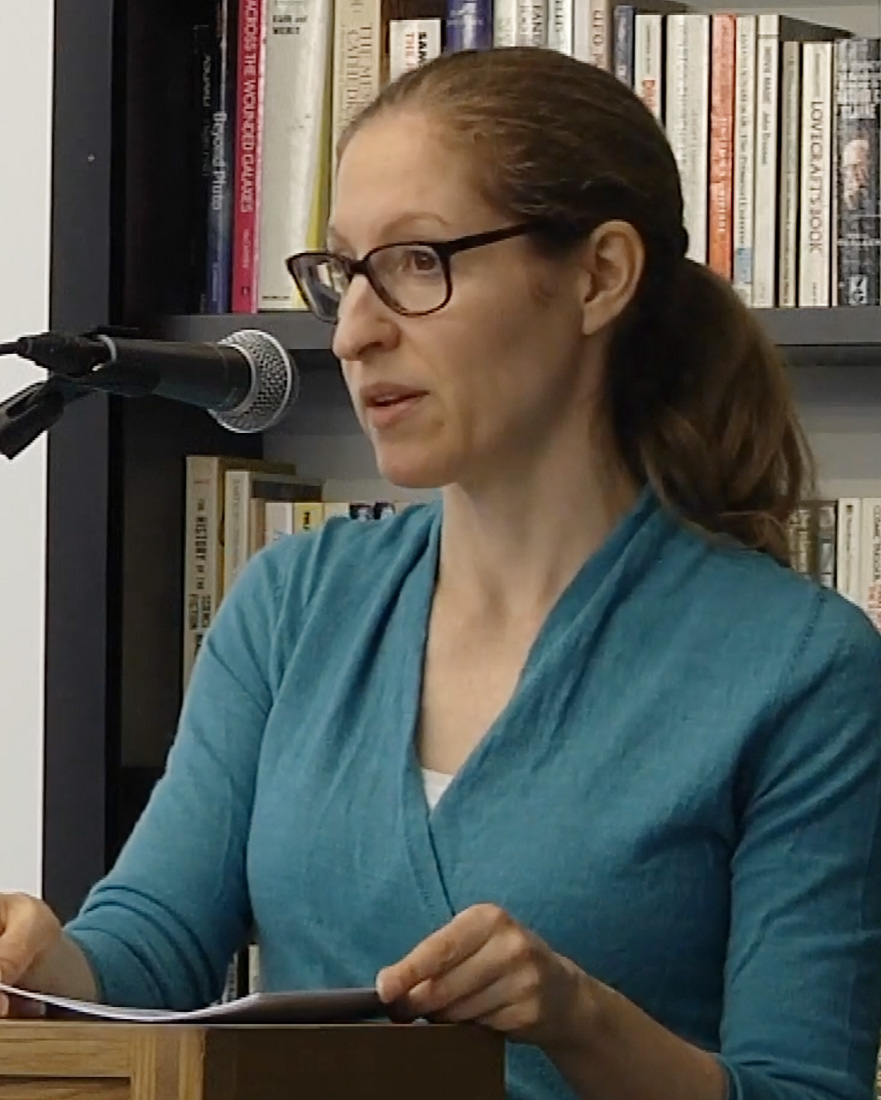

Academic background
- Education: Brown University; Georgetown University; Harvard University

Academic work
- Institutions: Northwestern University

Wendy Rhea Pearlman is an American political scientist who specializes on the politics of the Middle East. She is the Jane Long Professor of Arts and Sciences and Professor of Political Science at Northwestern University, where she has taught since 2008.

== Education and career ==
Pearlman graduated from Brown University magna cum laude in 1996 with a Bachelor of Arts in history. During her junior year at Brown, Pearlman studied abroad in Morocco, where she began studying Arabic. In 1996 and 1997, Pearlman completed a Fulbright Fellowship in Madrid, where she researched North African migrant communities.

Pearlman received a Master of Arts in government from Georgetown University before pursuing doctoral studies at Harvard University. She completed her Ph.D. in government from Harvard in 2007. She has taught at Northwestern University since 2008, where she held the Crown Junior Chairship in Middle East Studies (2009-15) and Crown Professorship of Middle East Studies (2022-24).

Pearlman has served as Co-Editor-in-Chief of the journal Perspectives on Politics since June 2023.

== Personal life ==
Pearlman was raised in the Chicago suburbs and Lincoln, Nebraska in "a non-religious, secular but Jewish household." She attended Lincoln Southeast High School, graduating in 1992.
