= Journal of Social Philosophy =

- Discipline: Social philosophy
- Language: English
- Edited by: Carol C. Gould

Publication details
- History: 1970-present
- Publisher: John Wiley & Sons
- Frequency: Quarterly
- Impact factor: 1.070 (2020)

Standard abbreviations
- ISO 4: J. Soc. Philos.

Indexing
- ISSN: 0047-2786 (print); 1467-9833 (web)
- LCCN: 73643848
- OCLC no.: 49863365

Links
- Journal homepage; Online access; Online archive

The Journal of Social Philosophy is a quarterly peer-reviewed academic journal of social philosophy covering work of normative and practical significance concerning social and political life. It was established in 1970 by the North American Society for Social Philosophy and is published by John Wiley & Sons. The editor-in-chief is Carol Gould (Hunter College and the Graduate Center, CUNY).

== Abstracting and indexing ==
The journal is abstracted and indexed in:

- Arts & Humanities Citation Index
- ATLA Religion Database
- Current Contents/Arts & Humanities
- Current Contents/Social & Behavioral Sciences
- EBSCO databases
- FRANCIS
- Philosopher's Index
- PhilPapers
- Répertoire International de Littérature Musicale
- Scopus
- Social Sciences Citation Index

According to the Journal Citation Reports, the journal has a 2020 impact factor of 1.070.

== See also ==
- List of ethics journals
