= Perspectives on Politics =

- Discipline: Political science
- Language: English
- Edited by: Ana Arjona, Wendy Pearlman

Publication details
- History: 2003-present
- Publisher: Cambridge University Press on behalf of the American Political Science Association (United States)
- Frequency: Quarterly
- Impact factor: 3.234 (2016)

Standard abbreviations
- ISO 4: Perspect. Politics

Indexing
- ISSN: 1537-5927 (print); 1541-0986 (web)
- LCCN: 2001215286
- JSTOR: 15375927
- OCLC no.: 865260348

Links
- Journal homepage; Journal page at publisher's website; Online access; Online archive

Perspectives on Politics is a quarterly peer-reviewed academic journal covering political science. It was established in 2003 and is published by Cambridge University Press on behalf of the American Political Science Association. The editors-in-chief are Ana Arjona and Wendy Pearlman (Northwestern University). The associate editor is Shmuel Nili (Northwestern); the founding editor was Jennifer Hochschild.

== Editorship ==
- 2023-: Ana Arjona, Wendy Pearlman
- 2017-2023: Michael Bernhard, Daniel I. O’Neill
- 2009-2017: Jeffrey C. Isaac
- 2005-2008: James Johnson
- 2002-2005: Jennifer Hochschild

== Abstracting and indexing ==
The journal is abstracted and indexed in the Social Sciences Citation Index and Current Contents/Social & Behavioral Sciences. According to the Journal Citation Reports, the journal has a 2016 impact factor of 3.234, ranking it 8th out of 165 journals in the category "Political Science".

== See also ==
- List of political science journals
