= M. Kent Jennings =

American political scientist (born 1934)

Myron Kent Jennings (born 1934) is an American political scientist best known for his work on the patterns and development of political preferences and behaviors among young Americans. He is widely held in libraries worldwide and is recognized as one of the "founding fathers" of political socialization research and theory. He is Distinguished Professor of Political Science at the University of California, Santa Barbara and Professor Emeritus of Political Science at the University of Michigan. He was elected to the American Academy of Arts and Sciences in 1982, and served as the president of the International Society of Political Psychology in 1989–1990 and as the president of the American Political Science Association in 1997–1998.

== Life and career ==
Jennings was born on a farm in the Central Valley, California in 1934. He earned his bachelor's degree in Government from the University of Redlands in 1956 and doctoral degree in Political Science from the University of North Carolina, Chapel Hill in 1961. After spending three years at the Brookings Institution in 1960–1963, he joined the University of Michigan and was promoted to full professor there in 1969. He was involved in the activities of the Institute for Social Research, the Center for Political Studies, and the Inter-university Consortium for Political and Social Research (ICPSR) at the University of Michigan and was one of the cofounders of ICPSR in 1963. He has been a professor in the Department of Political Science at the University of California, Santa Barbara since 1982. In 1984–1996, he held joint faculty appointment at both the University of California, Santa Barbara and the University of Michigan. He held visiting appointments at institutions such as the University of Oregon, Tilburg University, University of California, Los Angeles, and Arizona State University where he was the first Barry Goldwater Professor of American Institutions. His research has been supported by grants from the National Science Foundation, Russell Sage Foundation, Ford Foundation, National Institute of Mental Health, Army Research Institute, National Institute on Aging, etc. He was a Guggenheim Fellow in 1977–1978, a Fellow at the Center for Advanced Study in the Behavioral Sciences in 1977–1978, and a Fellow at the Netherlands Institute for Advanced Study in the Humanities and Social Sciences in 1989.

== Academic work ==
Jennings specializes in political socialization and public opinion, political psychology, comparative political behavior, gender and politics, and research design and data collection. He is most recognized for his research of the intergenerational transmission of political attitudes in the U.S. through youth-parent panel study, which dates to his earliest publication on the topic in 1968 and has become a longitudinal study with four waves. He is listed among the top 20 individuals in the field of American politics in the Political Science 400, a compendium of scholars whose work has been cited most frequently by other researchers. His research in the field of comparative politics touched on topics of local elites and mass public in a number of European countries and China.

His main publications include being author and co-author of Community Influentials: The Elites of Atlanta (1964), The Image of the Federal Service (1964),The Electoral Process (1966), Governing American Schools (1974), Comparative Political Socialization (1974), The Political Character of Adolescence (1974), Generation and Politics (1981), Parties in Transition (1986), Continuities in Political Action (1989), Elections at Home and Abroad (1994), and numerous book chapters and journal articles. His current research focuses on the longitudinal analyses of political orientations, gender and politics, and mass public participation in varying contexts.

== Awards ==
Jennings has won prizes from the American Political Science Association for the best dissertation in the field of state and local government in 1961, from the Western Political Science Association for the best paper on the topic of women and politics in 1983, and from the National Women's Caucus for Political Science for Mentor of Distinction Award in 1989 and 2002. He has won the Nevitt Sanford Award for "professional contributions to political psychology" from the International Society of Political Psychology in 1996, the Warren E. Miller Prize "for an outstanding career of intellectual accomplishment and service to the profession in the Elections, Public Opinion, and Voting Behavior field" from the American Political Science Association in 2004, the Warren E. Miller Award for "meritorious service to the social sciences" from the Inter-university Consortium for Political and Social Research (ICPSR) in 2007, the Harold Lasswell Award for "distinguished scientific contribution in the field of political psychology" from the International Society of Political Psychology in 2014，and the Frank J. Goodnow Award from the American Political Science Association (APSA) for distinguished service to the profession and the Association in 2020.
