= Walter F. Dodd =

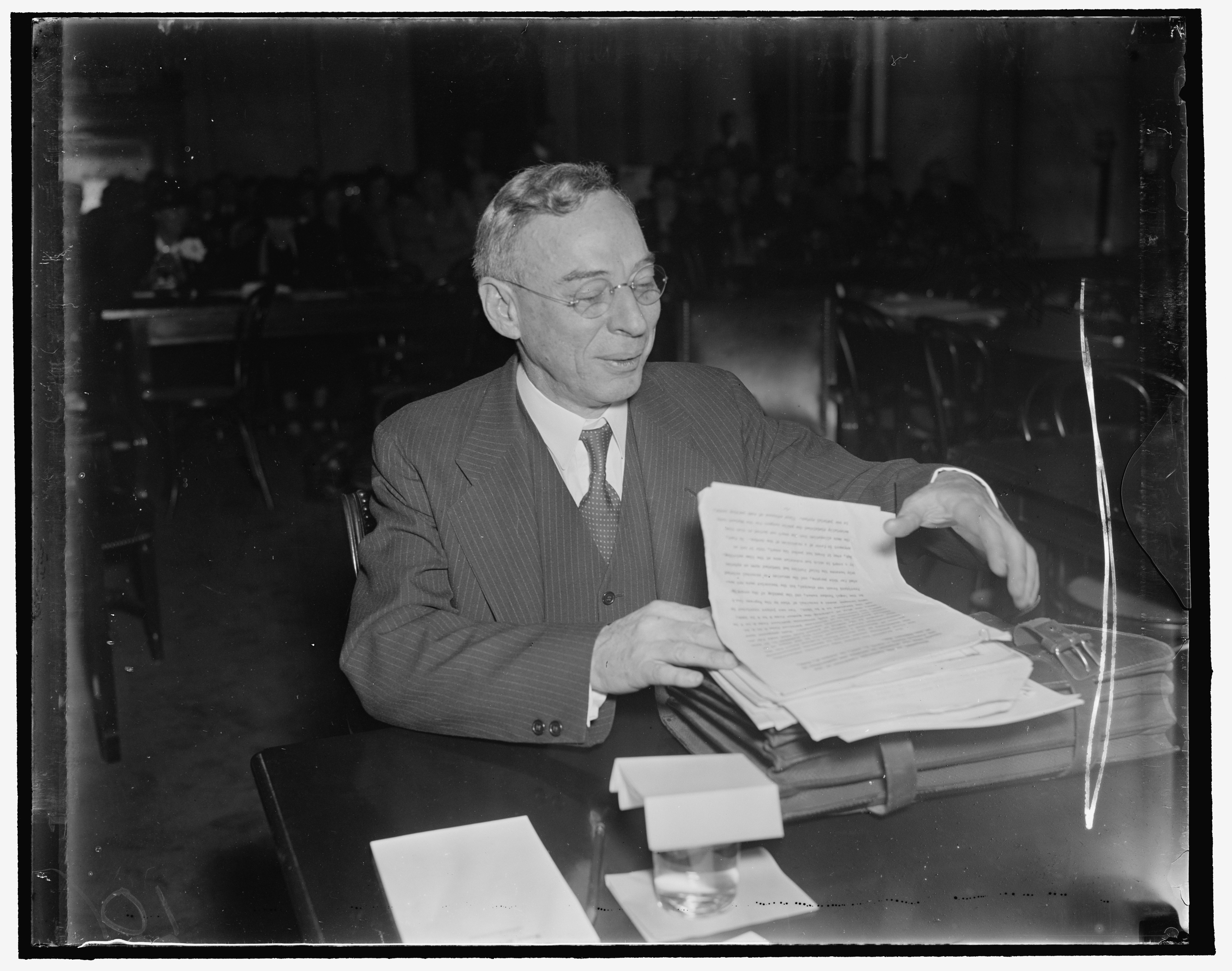
- Dodd in 1937
- Born: Walter Fairleigh Dodd; April 7, 1880; Hopkinsville, Kentucky, U.S.
- Died: April 14, 1960 (aged 80)
- Education: Stetson University (BS); University of Chicago (PhD)
- Occupation: lawyer

Walter Fairleigh Dodd (April 7, 1880 in Hopkinsville, Kentucky – April 14, 1960) was a professor in the political science department at Johns Hopkins University who wrote "one of the most important books on the process of amending state constitutions."

== Biography ==
He graduated from Florida State College in 1898, and received a Bachelors in Science from John B. Stetson University in 1901. At the University of Chicago, he was a Fellow, 1902–1904, and received a Ph.D. in 1905. In 1904–1907, he was in charge of the section of foreign law in the Library of Congress. He held a research appointment at Johns Hopkins in 1908–1910, in 1910–1911 was associate in political science, in 1911–1914 assistant professor, and in 1914–1915 associate professor of political science in the University of Illinois. After 1915, he was associate professor of political science in the University of Chicago. He served as the second Secretary of the State of Illinois' Legislative Reference Bureau in 1917–1918. He was president of the American Political Science Association from 1945 to 1946. In retirement, in 1946, Walter Dodd was retained to represent Vashti Cromwell McCollum in her landmark case challenging released time sectarian religious classes in the public schools of Champaign Illinois. The result was the 1948 decision, eight to one, in her favor (333 US 203).

== Works ==
- The Revision and Amendment of State Constitutions (Baltimore: Johns Hopkins University Press, 1910)
- Administration of workmen's compensation. New York: The Commonwealth Fund; London: H. Milford, Oxford University Press, 1936. 845pp. ("This study has been conducted under the auspices of the legal research committee of the commonwealth fund. cf. Foreword.")
