= Scott Althaus =

American academic

Scott Althaus is a professor of political science and of communication at the University of Illinois at Urbana-Champaign and the director of the Cline Center for Advanced Social Research at the university.

== Academic biography ==
Althaus completed his doctoral work in political science at Northwestern University. After that, he joined UIUC in 1996 and has stayed there ever since.

== Academic work ==
=== Journals ===
Althaus serves on the editorial boards of Critical Review, Human Communication Research, Journal of Communication, Political Communication, and Public Opinion Quarterly. His research has appeared in the American Political Science Review, the American Journal of Political Science, Communication Research, Journalism and Mass Communication Quarterly, Journal of Broadcasting & Electronic Media, Journal of Conflict Resolution, Journal of Politics, Public Opinion Quarterly, and Political Communication.

=== Books ===
Althaus authored a book on the political uses of opinion surveys in democratic societies titled Collective Preferences in Democratic Politics: Opinion Surveys and the Will of the People.

== Media coverage ==
Althaus has been cited and quoted on matters related to foreign policy and war in the New York Times and the Washington Post.
