= Arthur McMahon (sport shooter) =

Irish sport shooter

Personal information
- Born: 7 May 1921 Cootehill, Ireland
- Died: 15 August 1990 (aged 69) Blessington, Ireland

Sport
- Sport: Sports shooting

Arthur Eamonn McMahon (7 May 1921 – 15 August 1990) was an Irish sports shooter. He competed at the 1968 Summer Olympics and the 1972 Summer Olympics.
