= Jennifer Hochschild =

American political scientist

- Title: Henry LaBarre Jayne Professor of Government; Professor of African and African American Studies; Harvard College Professor

Academic background
- Education: Oberlin College

Jennifer Lucy Hochschild (born September 17, 1950) is an American political scientist. She serves as the Henry LaBarre Jayne Professor of Government, Professor of African and African American Studies and Harvard College Professor at Harvard University. She is also a member of the faculty at Harvard's Graduate School of Education and John F. Kennedy School of Government.

== Education ==
Hochschild received her undergraduate degree from Oberlin College, and was inducted into Phi Beta Kappa. She also went to Yale from 1972 - 1979

== Career ==
Hochschild was the 2015–2016 President of the American Political Science Association.

In 2019, Hochschild was on the ad hoc committee involved in denying tenure to Lorgia García Peña, an Afro-Latina professor in the Department of Romance Languages and Literatures. According to a New Yorker article, Hochschild had characterized Peña's work as "not research, but activism."

In February 2022, Hochschild was one of 38 Harvard faculty to sign a letter to The Harvard Crimson defending professor John Comaroff after he was placed on unpaid leave for violating the university's sexual and professional conduct policies. After Harvard graduate students filed a lawsuit with detailed allegations of Comaroff's sexual harassment, Hochschild and other professors said they wished to retract their signatures.

In January 2024, Hochschild wrote on Twitter that students at Harvard Extension School were "great" but "not what we typically normally think of as Harvard graduate students." Hochschild, who taught courses at HES, suggested that HES graduate Christopher Rufo, a critic of former Harvard president Claudine Gay, had misrepresented his Harvard credentials by not mentioning his HES affiliation. The Harvard Extension Student Association said that it was "deeply concerned and disappointed" by Hochschild's remarks. Hochschild apologized for her comments, clarifying that "students should proudly state their HES degree".

== Works ==
- What’s Fair: American Beliefs and Distributive Justice (Harvard University Press, 1981)
- The New American Dilemma: Liberal Democracy and School Desegregation (Yale University Press, 1984)
- Facing Up to the American Dream: Race, Class and the Soul of the Nation (Princeton University Press, 1995)
- ed. Social Policies for Children with Sara McLanahan and Irwin Garfinkel (Brookings Institution, 1996)
- The American Dream and the Public Schools with Nathan Scovronick (Oxford University Press, 2003)
- Creating a New Racial Order: How Immigration, Multiracialism, Genomics, and the Young Can Remake Race in America with Vesla Weaver and Traci Burch (Princeton University Press, 2012)
- ed. Outsiders No More? Models of Immigrant Political Incorporation with Jacqueline Chattopadhyay, Claudine Gay, and Michael Jones-Correa (Oxford University Press, 2013)
