= Arthur MacMahon =

American political scientist

Arthur Whittier MacMahon (May 29, 1890 – February 4, 1980) was an American political scientist, president of the American Political Science Association in 1946–47, and a pioneer in the academic study of public administration.

== Biography ==
MacMahon was born in Brooklyn, New York on May 29, 1890, the son of Benjamin and Abbie MacMahon. He received his B.A. from Columbia University in 1912, where hewas a member of the Philolexian Society, and his M.A. in 1913. Immediately after receiving his M.A., MacMahon began teaching as an instructor in Columbia's government department. During this period, MacMahon also befriended the artist Georgia O'Keeffe and helped to introduce her to liberal political ideas. While teaching, MacMahon continued his studies and completed his PhD at Columbia in 1923. He was then promoted to assistant professor. Throughout his early years at Columbia, MacMahon worked closely with the historian Charles A. Beard, whom he considered an important mentor.

After receiving his PhD, MacMahon became an important academic voice in the study of government and public administration. Some of his earliest pieces were yearly reports on events in Congress, published in the American Political Science Review from 1927 to 1931, that sparked new interest in research on the legislative process.

MacMahon's career took off in the 1930s as he became "an exceptionally popular teacher and his department's best-known faculty member." The central theme of MacMahon's scholarly work was the study "of the various obstacles to effective management found in public agencies," leading MacMahon to begin the development of the study of public administration. MacMahon was also one of the first scholars to attempt to use empirical studies and methods borrowed from the other sciences to study the functioning of government.

In recognition of his work in public administration, MacMahon was appointed as staff member of the Brownlow Commission, which focused on changes to the federal bureaucracy. MacMahon's work on management for the Commission was very influential, and led to changes in the organization of the executive branch. MacMahon's work with the commission also helped provide the material for his later academic work.

In 1945, MacMahon was named the Eaton Professor of Public Administration at Columbia, holding that chair until 1958. In that period, MacMahon also held temporary visiting appointments at Stanford, Princeton, and Yale although he remained firmly committed to Columbia, where he had studied and taught for over 40 years.

MacMahon was a lifelong member of the American Political Science Association, and served as its President in the 1946–1947 year. He sat on the board of a number of other organizations, including the American Society of Public Administration (of which he was a founding member), and served as the editor of Political Science Quarterly.

After officially retiring in 1958, MacMahon moved to Poughkeepsie, New York, but traveled frequently teaching and lecturing in Turkey, India, Uganda, and Argentina. In 1978, MacMahon entered a nursing home, where he lived until his death in 1980.

== Scholarly work ==
MacMahon's scholarship covered a wide number of areas, including foreign policy, political economy and political theory, but his primary focus was always public administration, but he was "best known as one of the pioneers who led to the development of public administration." Most of his influential works focused on that area, and almost all of them involved public administration at least tangentially.

=== Federal Administrators ===
In 1939, MacMahon and his colleague John Millet published the book Federal Administrators: A Biographical Approach to the Problem of Department Management, which focused on the "day to day experiences of assistant and deputy department secretaries", analyzing their performance. The book was immediately recognized by reviewers as "one of the most significant books of the year," and quickly became a widely cited and influential text, considered by its reviewers to be "a lasting enrichment of the study of public administration in the United States."

In the book, MacMahon and Millet concluded that government departments needed "both political and administrative leadership." This conclusion in time became "a fundamental enunciation of departmental policy" for the US government and continues to shape the way the federal bureaucracy is run today.

=== Government management ===
After Federal Administrators, MacMahon continued to study "the relationship of the administrative expert to the political authority" in works such as Administration in Foreign Affairs (1953), The Administration of Federal Work Relief (1939) and Autonomous Public Enterprise (1940). In these works, MacMahon also examined the role of "uninformed popular opinion" in shaping government policy.

==== The Administration of Federal Work Relief ====
In The Administration of Federal Work Relief, written with John Millet and Gladys Ogden, MacMahon presented a detailed history of the Works Progress Administration, with an emphasis on "how the confusion and uncertainty that prevailed in the preliminary planning and legislative stages of the program were carried over into its administration." MacMahon also analyzed the management structure of the WPA and the proper role for political authorities, particularly the President of the United States to play in the organization. MacMahon concluded that it was inappropriate for the President to lead the WPA, and that an independent administrator should be chosen.

==== Administration in Foreign Affairs ====
MacMahon's work Administration in Foreign Affairs focused on how to effectively organize the government to create foreign policy. Clarence Thurber, writing in the Western Political Quarterly called the book "the best general volume that has appeared on the administration of foreign affairs in the United States", and other reviewers were similarly positive. In the book, MacMahon proposed that foreign policy problems should be handled by a single, centralized "Department of Foreign Affairs", which would handle all matters of foreign affairs, including all US programs operating abroad, particularly with regard to integrating economic policy into the State Department. This recommendation was "most controversial" and contradicted the findings of several government commissions on the subject.

=== Federalism ===
Late in his career, MacMahon developed an interest in federalism, publishing three books on the subject. His first work on federalism was the collection Federalism, Mature and Emergent, which he edited. In his introduction to the book, MacMahon wrote about the process of European integration, and the gradual move towards a federalist Europe. MacMahon also wrote two books on the subject of federalism himself: Delegation and Autonomy (1962) and Administering Federalism in a Democracy (1972).

==== Delegation and Autonomy ====
Delegation and Autonomy was based on a series of lectures that MacMahon delivered at the Indian Institute of Public Administration in 1960. Though the lectures were delivered in India, MacMahon focuses primarily on the American experience of federalism and decentralization. MacMahon focused on the economic and administrative challenges in decentralization. The book was not revolutionary, but received a good reception among reviewers, one of whom called it "a systematic compendium, rich in illustrations, but still richer in suggestive analysis."

==== Administering Federalism in a Democracy ====
Published in 1972, Administering Federalism in a Democracy was MacMahon's last major work. The work focused on the nature of American federalism, with an emphasis on the institutions involved. The book was not as well received as many of MacMahon's earlier pieces, and was criticized for avoiding many of the relevant issues in American politics such as racism and the differences between the states in America. William Stewart wrote that the book "presents material which is already available elsewhere" and avoids "the issues ... at the heart of the contemporary problems of American federalism."
