= Journal of Broadcasting & Electronic Media =

- Discipline: Media studies
- Language: English
- Edited by: Carolyn A. Lin

Publication details
- Former name: Journal of Broadcasting
- History: 1957–present
- Publisher: Routledge
- Frequency: Quarterly
- Impact factor: 1.917 (2018)

Standard abbreviations
- ISO 4: J. Broadcast. Electron. Media

Indexing
- ISSN: 0883-8151 (print); 1550-6878 (web)

Links
- Journal homepage; Online access

The Journal of Broadcasting & Electronic Media is a quarterly peer-reviewed academic journal covering media studies, with a specific focus on broadcasting and electronic media. It was established in 1957 as the Journal of Broadcasting, obtaining its current name in 1985. The editor-in-chief is Carolyn A. Lin. According to the Journal Citation Reports, the journal has a 2017 impact factor of 1.917 and a five-year impact factor of 2.885.
