= Texas State Highway 18 =

State highway in Texas

State Highway 18
- SH 18 highlighted in red

Route information
- Maintained by TxDOT
- Length: 83.486 mi (134.358 km)
- Existed: 1958–present

Major junctions
- South end: I-10 BL / US 285 in Fort Stockton
- I-10 / US 67 in Fort Stockton; SH 329 in Grandfalls; I-20 in Monahans; SH 302 in Kermit; SH 115 in Kermit
- North end: NM 18 near Jal, NM

Location
- Country: United States
- State: Texas
- Counties: Pecos, Ward, Winkler

Highway system
- Highways in Texas; Interstate; US; State; Former; Toll; Loops; Spurs; FM/RM; Park; Rec
← SH 17	→ SH 19

State Highway 18 (SH 18) is a state highway in the U.S. state of Texas maintained by the Texas Department of Transportation (TxDOT) that runs from Fort Stockton in western Texas to the New Mexico state line between Kermit and Jal, New Mexico. This route was designated in 1958 over the northern half of what was previously SH 82.

== Route description ==
SH 18 begins at Fort Stockton at an intersection with Business Interstate 10 and US 285. Heading north, it soon intersects Interstate 10 and US 67, which is in concurrency with the interstate. It continues traveling north through oil fields and rural ranch land. 25 miles north of Fort Stockton, SH 18 intersects Farm to Market Road 1450. The highway continues north and enters Grandfalls. In Grandfalls, the highway intersects SH 329 and Farm to Market Road 11. The highway continues north, intersecting Farm to Market Road 1776, Farm to Market Road 1233, Loop 464, and Interstate 20 before reaching Monahans. In Monahans SH 18 intersects Business Interstate 20 and continues northwest, making a second interchange with SH 464. Eight miles northwest of Monahans, the highway intersects Farm to Market Road 1219. SH 18 continues in a slightly northwest direction toward Kermit, making an interchange with Farm to Market Road 1232 along the way. In Kermit the highway has an intersection with SH 302 and a slight western concurrency with SH 115 before continuing to head northwest out of Kermit. The highway ends at the New Mexico state line, where the road becomes New Mexico State Road 18.

== History ==
The current routing was originally planned as State Highway 17 as recently as 1922. On August 21, 1923, the SH 17 designation has been transferred to the routing of SH 17A, while this route was renumbered as SH 82. On February 27, 1958, the route was again renumbered as SH 18, to coordinate with the connecting New Mexico Highway 18 to the north.

Historic SH 18

SH 18 was one of the first 25 Texas state routes proposed on June 21, 1917, overlaid on the Albany-Bronco Highway. The original proposal was a route through the Southern Plains from Bronco in Yoakum County to Lubbock, then southeast to Albany. On December 20, 1917, SH 18 had extended southeast to Cisco and replaced SH 36 to Waco. By 1919, SH 18 was rerouted through Eastland. On August 21, 1923, the route had been changed significantly. The section of the route from Spur to Albany was intact, but the previous westward route veered northward instead to Turkey, with the old route being renumbered to SH 53. The section from Albany to Cisco became part of rerouted SH 23, the section from Cisco to Eastland was already part of SH 1, so that section was cancelled, and the section from Eastland to Waco became part of the new SH 67. SH 18 was instead extended northeast to Memphis. On November 19, 1923, the section of SH 18 from Turkey to Memphis was cancelled, and SH 18 was rerouted east to Estelline instead. On July 13, 1925, a split from Aspermont to Anson was added. This split became part of SH 4 on December 6, 1927. On October 22, 1935, SH 18 Loop was designated through Roaring Springs. On December 22, 1936, the section from Turkey to Estelline became part of SH 86. On May 24, 1938, it was extended farther northward to the Oklahoma state line, overtaking SH 88 from Turkey to Oklahoma. On January 6, 1939, two SH 18 Spur routes were designated to Spur and Peacock. On September 26, 1939, the portion from Matador to Albany was reassigned to U.S. Highway 62, SH 70, and U.S. Highway 380. The two SH 18 Spur routes were renumbered as Spur 21 (Spur) and Spur 22 (Peacock). SH 18 Loop was redesignated as Loop 42. SH 18 was extended further north to Perryton on May 21, 1940, and on October 10, 1947, became part of SH 70 when SH 70 was extended into Matador from the south due to the rerouting of U.S. Highway 62 off of this road.

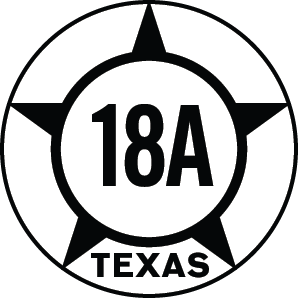
Historic SH 18A

SH 18A was an alternate route along SH 18 proposed on August 19, 1918. It covered a shorter route between Spur and Crosbyton during the 1920s.

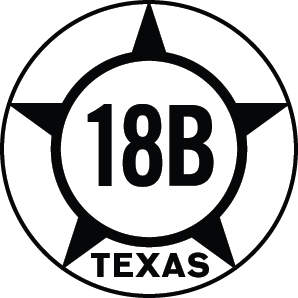
Historic SH 18B

SH 18B was a more southerly route proposed on January 23, 1919. It was to branch off from SH 18 in Brownfield, travel southeast to Lamesa, then run due east to Albany. It is unknown if it had been built before being renumbered on August 21, 1923, as SH 83, with the section from Lamesa to Brownfield cancelled.

== Major intersections ==
County	Location	mi	km	Destinations	Notes
Pecos	Fort Stockton	0.0	0.0	I-10 BL / US 285 (West Dickinson Boulevard)	Southern terminus
Pecos	Fort Stockton	0.9	1.4	I-10 / US 67 – El Paso, Ozona	I-10 exit 259B
Pecos		24.6	39.6	FM 1450 to FM 1053 – Pecos	
Pecos		28.0	45.1	RM 2593 east – Reservoir	
Ward	Grandfalls	31.6	50.9	FM 11 east – Imperial	
Ward	Grandfalls	31.8	51.2	SH 329 east (1st Street) – Crane	
Ward	Royalty	34.3	55.2	FM 1219 north – Wickett	
Ward		42.0	67.6	FM 1776 south – Coyanosa	
Ward		44.6	71.8	FM 1233 east to US 385	
Ward		45.9	73.9	Loop 464 north (truck route) to SH 18 north / I-20	
Ward	Monahans	48.6	78.2	I-20 – Pecos, Odessa	I-20 exit 80
Ward	Monahans	49.9	80.3	I-20 BL (Sealy Street)	
Ward		52.4	84.3	Loop 464 south (truck route) to I-20 / I-20 BL	
Ward		57.5	92.5	FM 1219 south – Wickett	
Winkler		67.3	108.3	FM 1232 west – Wink	
Winkler	Kermit	72.2	116.2	SH 302 (Jim Sharp Boulevard / truck route) – Mentone, Odessa	
Winkler	Kermit	73.0	117.5	SH 115 north (East Austin Street)	south end of SH 115 overlap
Winkler	Kermit	73.2	117.8	SH 115 south (West Austin Street / truck route) – Wink	north end of SH 115 overlap
Winkler		77.5	124.7	FM 874 to SH 115 / SH 302	
Winkler		83.7	134.7	NM 18 north – Jal	Continuation into New Mexico
1.000 mi = 1.609 km; 1.000 km = 0.621 mi
