= Farm to Market Road 1776 =

Road in Texas, United States

Farm to Market Road 1776

Route information
- Maintained by TxDOT
- Length: 43.906 mi (70.660 km) Length does not include segment concurrent with FM 1450
- Existed: 1955–present

Major junctions
- South end: I-10 / US 67
- US 285; FM 1450; FM 1927; FM 1219
- North end: SH 18 near Monahans

Location
- Country: United States
- State: Texas
- Counties: Pecos, Ward

Highway system
- Highways in Texas; Interstate; US; State; Former; Toll; Loops; Spurs; FM/RM; Park; Rec
← FM 1775	→ FM 1777

Farm to Market Road 1776 (FM 1776) is a Farm to Market Road in the U.S. state of Texas maintained by the Texas Department of Transportation (TxDOT). The 45-mile (72 km) road begins at a junction with Interstate 10 (I-10) and U.S. Highway 67 (US 67) in Pecos County west of Fort Stockton and extends northward through the town of Coyanosa before ending at State Highway 18 (SH 18) in Ward County south of Monahans. The road has an interchange with US 285 northeast of Fort Stockton.

Before the road was established, TxDOT had previously assigned the road's numerical designation to two other roads in eastern Texas.

== Route description ==
FM 1776 begins at I-10 Exit 248 as a northward extension of the US 67 roadway which approaches from the southwest from Alpine and merges with I-10. The two-lane road continues to the north beneath the US 285 underpass and reaches Coyanosa. North of Coyanosa, FM 1776 joins and follows FM 1450 for a one-half-mile (0.8 km) stretch southeast of the city of Pecos before turning off to the northeast. The road then leaves Pecos County at the Pecos River and crosses into Ward County where it intersects FM 1927 south of Pyote. The road then proceeds to the northeast crossing FM 1219 between Royalty and Wickett before terminating at SH 18 approximately 8 miles (13 km) south of Monahans.

== History ==
Farm to Market Road 1776
- Location: Bronson–Ford's Corner
- Length: 10.2 mi (16.4 km)
- Existed: Sept. 1951–Oct. 1954

FM 1776 was originally designated northward along a former alignment of US 96 between SH 184 at Bronson in Sabine County and SH 21 at Ford's Corner in San Augustine County on September 19, 1951. The former 10.2-mile (16.4 km) road became an extension of FM 1 on October 14, 1954.

Farm to Market Road 1776
- Location: Grimes County
- Length: 6.2 mi (10.0 km)
- Existed: Feb. 1955–Nov. 1955

FM 1776 was briefly designated on February 17, 1955 along a Grimes County route from FM 149 in Richards southeastward toward Dacus to the Montgomery County line. The designation of the 6.2-mile (10.0 km) route did not survive the year before being combined with FM 1486 on November 2 of that year.

The current route was designated on October 25, 1955 (numbered after the above elimination) between FM 1450 and SH 18. The road was extended southward through Coyanosa to US 67 and US 290, the predecessor route to I-10 in much of western Texas, on May 6, 1964.

Construction began on the US 285 interchange in 2011 and was completed the following year. The interchange was funded through a 2009 safety bond program due to a history of fatal accidents.

== Major intersections ==
County	Location	mi	km	Destinations	Notes
Pecos		0.0	0.0	I-10 / US 67 – Van Horn, Alpine, Fort Stockton, San Antonio	Southern terminus
Pecos		7.1	11.4	US 285 – Fort Stockton, Pecos	
Pecos		26.5	42.6	FM 1450 west – Pecos	Begin overlay of FM 1450
Pecos		27.0	43.5	FM 1450 east – Imperial	End overlay of FM 1450
Pecos River		34.1	54.9	Pecos River bridge	
Ward		35.1	56.5	FM 1927 – Pyote	
Ward		39.5	63.6	FM 1219 – Royalty, Wickett	
Ward		44.8	72.1	SH 18 – Fort Stockton, Monahans	
1.000 mi = 1.609 km; 1.000 km = 0.621 mi
