= Farm to Market Road 1450 =

Road in Texas, United States

Farm to Market Road 1450

Route information
- Maintained by TxDOT
- Length: 44.134 mi (71.027 km)
- Existed: 1951–present

Major junctions
- West end: US 285 near Pecos
- FM 1776; SH 18; RM 2593
- East end: FM 1053

Location
- Country: United States
- State: Texas
- Counties: Reeves, Pecos

Highway system
- Highways in Texas; Interstate; US; State; Former; Toll; Loops; Spurs; FM/RM; Park; Rec
← FM 1449	→ FM 1451

Farm to Market Road 1450 (FM 1450) is a Farm to Market Road in the U.S. state of Texas maintained by the Texas Department of Transportation (TxDOT). The road, located in southeastern Reeves and northern Pecos counties, begins at U.S. Route 285 (US 285) near Pecos and intersects FM 1776, State Highway 18 (SH 18), and Ranch to Market Road 2593 (RM 2503) before terminating at FM 1053. The route number was formerly designated over a road in Freestone County.

== Route description ==
FM 1450 begins at US 285 approximately 3.0 miles (4.8 km) southeast of Pecos in Reeves County, and the two-lane road proceeds to the southeast. After crossing into Pecos County, FM 1776 joins the road from the south and briefly runs concurrently with FM 1450 before FM 1776 turns off to the north. The road continues to the southeast and crosses SH 18. RM 2593 turns off the road to the north before the route ends at FM 1053. The roadway continues to the southeast as a county road. FM 1450 passes through agricultural land and encounters no cities or towns.

== History ==
FM 1450 was originally designated on July 20, 1949 as a route in Freestone County stretching from SH 14 in Wortham 1.6 miles (2.6 km) westward to the Limestone County line. That designation was short-lived, and was cancelled on February 15, 1950 when the route was combined with FM 27 as an extension.

The designation was quickly reused on May 23, 1951 along the present route in Pecos County between SH 18 (then known as SH 82) and FM 1053. On January 28, 1954, the route was extended to the Reeves County line and then to US 285 on September 29 of that year.

== Major intersections ==
County	Location	mi	km	Destinations	Notes
Reeves		0	0.0	US 285 – Fort Stockton, Pecos	Western terminus
Pecos		24.9	40.1	FM 1776 south – Coyanosa, Alpine	Begin overlay of FM 1776
Pecos		25.3	40.7	FM 1776 north – Monahans	End overlay of FM 1776
Pecos		35.5	57.1	SH 18 – Fort Stockton, Grandfalls	
Pecos		38.8	62.4	RM 2593	
Pecos		44.2	71.1	FM 1053 – Fort Stockton, Imperial	Eastern terminus; roadway continues as 7 Mile Rd.
1.000 mi = 1.609 km; 1.000 km = 0.621 mi
