= U.S. Route 285 in Texas =

Segment of American highway

U.S. Highway 285
- US 285 in Texas highlighted in red

Route information
- Maintained by TxDOT
- Length: 169.372 mi (272.578 km)
- Existed: 1935–present

Major junctions
- South end: US 90 in Sanderson
- I-10 / US 67 in Fort Stockton; I-20 in Pecos
- North end: US 285 at the New Mexico state line near Orla

Location
- Country: United States
- State: Texas
- Counties: Terrell, Pecos, Reeves, Culberson

Highway system
- United States Numbered Highway System; List; Special; Divided; Highways in Texas; Interstate; US; State; Former; Toll; Loops; Spurs; FM/RM; Park; Rec
← SH 284	→ SH 285

U.S. Highway 285 (US 285) travels from Sanderson, Texas, to Denver, Colorado. In Texas, US 285 begins at an intersection with US 90 in Sanderson, traveling through Fort Stockton and Pecos before exiting the state into New Mexico between Pecos and Carlsbad.

== Route description ==
US 285 begins at an intersection with U.S. Route 90 in Sanderson, just west of the downtown area. The highway travels through highly rural areas of Terrell and Pecos County before entering Fort Stockton. In Fort Stockton, US 285 shares a short overlap with U.S. Route 385 and meets Interstate 10 before leaving the town. US 285 has an interchange with Farm to Market Road 1776, which serves the Firestone Tire and Rubber Company test track. After FM 1776, US 285 takes on a highly rural route until entering Pecos, where the highway meets with Interstate 20. US 285 briefly runs through Culberson County before crossing the state line into New Mexico.

US 285 has acquired the nickname "Death Highway" because the traffic from oil tank trucks has increased the number of road fatalities by 67% since the beginning of the 2010s oil boom.

== Junction list ==
County	Location	mi	km	Destinations	Notes
Terrell	Sanderson	0.0	0.0	US 90 – Marathon, Dryden	
Pecos		14.8	23.8	RM 2400 east to SH 349	
Pecos	Fort Stockton	63.8	102.7	US 385 north / I-10 BL east – Ozona	South end of US 385/BL I-10 overlap
Pecos	Fort Stockton	64.2	103.3	FM 1053 north (Main Street)	
Pecos	Fort Stockton	64.4	103.6	US 385 south – Big Bend National Park	North end of US 385 overlap
Pecos	Fort Stockton	64.6	104.0	SH 18 north (Front Street)	Access to Pecos County Memorial Hospital
Pecos	Fort Stockton	65.2	104.9	I-10 BL west (Dickinson Boulevard) – Balmorhea, Alpine	North end of BL I-10 overlap
Pecos	Fort Stockton	66.0	106.2	I-10 / US 67 – El Paso, Ozona	I-10 exit 257
Pecos		77.4	124.6	FM 1776 – Coyanosa	Interchange
Reeves		99.9	160.8	FM 2007 south	
Reeves		113.9	183.3	FM 1450 east	
Reeves	Pecos	115.4	185.7	I-20 – El Paso, Monahans	I-20 exit 42
Reeves	Pecos	117.4	188.9	I-20 BL	Former US 80
Reeves	Pecos	118.1	190.1	FM 1216 north to FM 3398	
Reeves		134.6	216.6	SH 302 east – Mentone	
Reeves	Orla	155.7	250.6	RM 652 – Jal	
Culberson		169.8	273.3	US 285 north – Carlsbad	Texas–New Mexico state line
1.000 mi = 1.609 km; 1.000 km = 0.621 mi: Concurrency terminus
