= Neighbours Boulevard =

Neighbours Boulevard in Blythe, California contains two designations:

- California State Route 78
- Interstate 10 Business (Blythe, California)
