= Interstate 20 in Texas =

Section of Interstate Highway in Texas

Interstate 20
- I-20 highlighted in red

Route information
- Maintained by TxDOT
- Length: 636.08 mi (1,023.67 km)
- Existed: 1959–present
- NHS: Entire route

Major junctions
- West end: I-10 in Reeves County
- I-820 in Benbrook and Kennedale; I-30 near Fort Worth; Chisholm Trail Parkway in Fort Worth; I-35W in Fort Worth; Pres. George Bush Turnpike in Grand Prairie; US 67 in Dallas; I-35E / US 77 in Dallas; I-45 in Dallas; I-635 in Balch Springs; Future I-369 / US 59 in Marshall
- East end: I-20 near Greenwood, LA

Location
- Country: United States
- State: Texas
- Counties: Reeves, Ward, Crane, Ector, Midland, Martin, Howard, Mitchell, Nolan, Taylor, Callahan, Eastland, Erath, Palo Pinto, Parker, Tarrant, Dallas, Kaufman, Van Zandt, Smith, Gregg, Harrison

Highway system
- Interstate Highway System; Main; Auxiliary; Suffixed; Business; Future; Highways in Texas; Interstate; US; State; Former; Toll; Loops; Spurs; FM/RM; Park; Rec
← SH 19	→ SH 20

Interstate 20 (I-20 (Note: Some sources use "IH 20", as "IH" is an abbreviation used by the Texas Department of Transportation for Interstate Highways.)) is a major east–west Interstate Highway in Texas, running east from a junction with I-10 east of Kent, Texas, through the Dallas–Fort Worth metroplex to the Louisiana state line near Waskom, Texas. The original distance of I-20 was 647 miles (1,041 km) from I-10 to the Louisiana state line, reduced to the current distance of 636 miles (1,024 km) with the rerouting of I-20 in the 1980s and 1990s. I-20 is known as the Ronald Reagan Memorial Highway within the Dallas–Fort Worth metroplex.

== History ==
I-20 in Texas was designated in 1959, and was to replace or run parallel to U.S. Route 80 (US 80). Initial construction began from east to west and as bypass loops around larger cities. By 1967, the highway was complete from the Louisiana state line to the western side of Fort Worth on a route to the south of US 80, with slower construction in the lesser populated areas of West Texas concurrent with US 80. On December 2, 1971, I-20 was rerouted across the southern side of the Dallas–Fort Worth metroplex, with the old section through downtown Dallas and Fort Worth being redesignated as I-30. In 1991, the entire concurrent designation of US 80 was removed from the I-10 interchange to Dallas.

== Route description ==
=== West Texas ===
I-20 begins its eastward journey at a junction with I-10 in a desolate region of West Texas about 6 miles (10 km) east of the town of Kent. I-20 leaves the interchange with I-10 with a speed limit of 80 mph (130 km/h) until milemarker 89. I-20 also generally heads to the east-northeast passing by the cities of Odessa and Midland while transitioning from the West Texas desert to the prairie. I-20 runs concurrently with the La Entrada al Pacífico corridor from its junction with US 385 in Odessa to its junction with Farm to Market Road 1788 (FM 1788) near Midland International Airport. Near Sweetwater, I-20 begins to head east as it heads toward the city of Abilene. In Abilene, I-20 curves toward the north and transverses the northern part of the city while also forming the northern arc of the loop around the city. I-20 continues heading east from Abilene until the town of Eastland when I-20 takes a more northeasterly route toward Weatherford while transitioning from the West Texas prairie to the central plains of North Texas as the terrain grows hilly. In Weatherford, I-20 again heads back toward the east as it heads toward the Dallas–Fort Worth metroplex.

=== Dallas–Fort Worth area ===
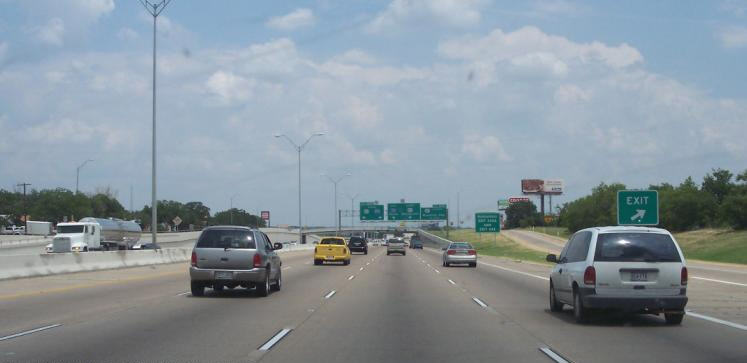
I-20 in southern Fort Worth

I-20 interchanges with I-30 west of Fort Worth with I-30 heading east and I-20 to the southeast. I-20 heads back toward the east when it interchanges with I-820. I-20 forms the southern arc of the complete loop around the city of Fort Worth, and serves as the southernmost west–east freeway in the Dallas–Fort Worth metroplex. Interchanging with I-35W south of downtown Fort Worth, I-20 heads east toward Dallas passing through Arlington, where it is also known as the Ronald Reagan Memorial Highway. From Arlington, I-20 passes into Dallas County at Grand Prairie and heads east in to Dallas, interchanging with I-35E south of downtown and I-45 shortly after. I-20 intersects with I-635 (where it completes a three-quarter loop around the city) on Dallas' southeast side before heading east toward East Texas. The Interstate varies from 4 to 10 lanes from its I-30 junction near Aledo to its US 80 junction near Terrell.

=== East Texas ===
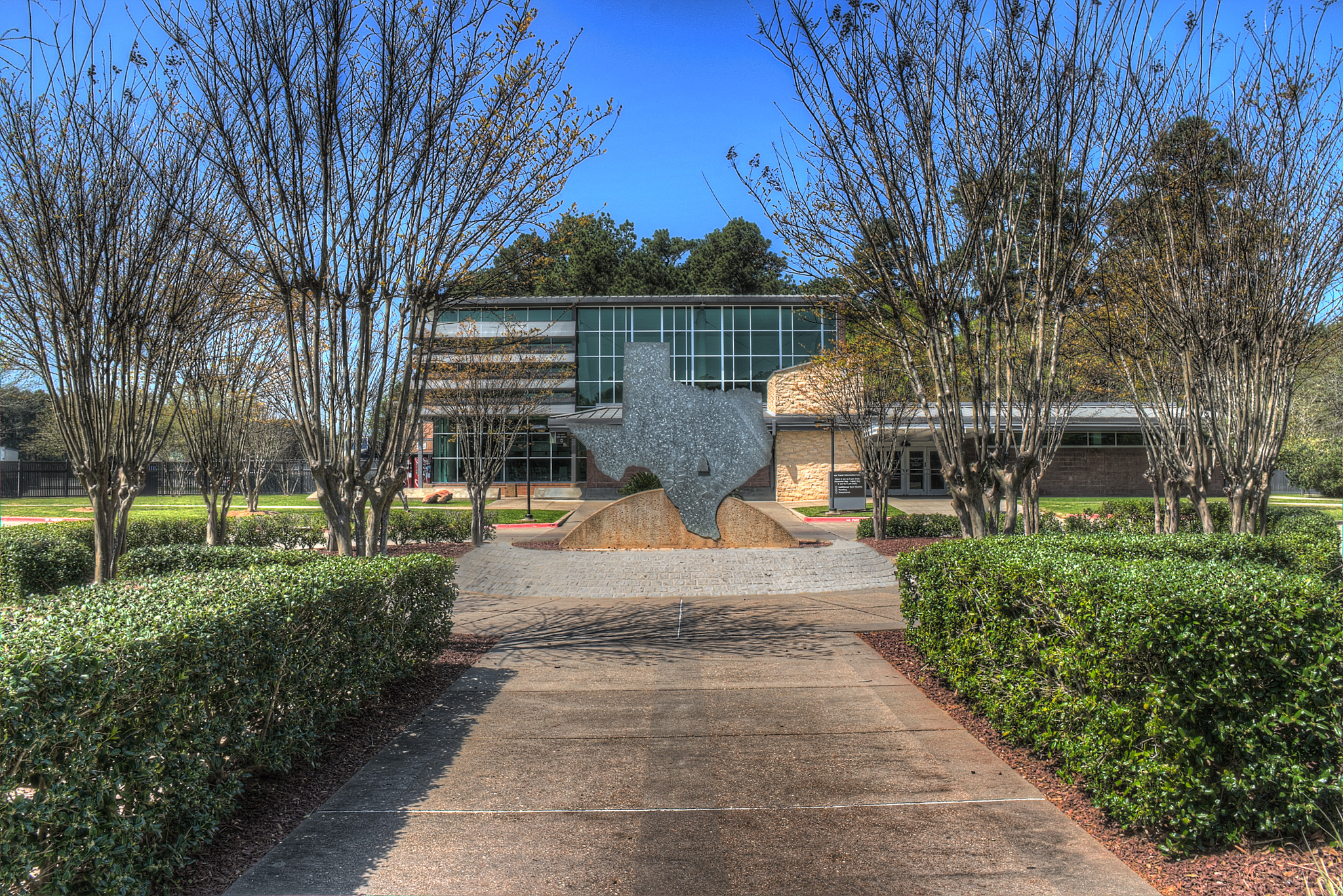
A travel information center located at I-20 exit 635

I-20 leaves the Dallas–Fort Worth metroplex and heads generally to the east-southeast through East Texas. I-20 begins heading to the east as it passes to the north of the city of Canton. The intersection of I-20 at US 69 in Lindale just north of Tyler is the highest traffic count intersection on I-20 east of Terrell to the Louisiana state line. From Lindale, I-20 continues east, going through the piney woods region of East Texas intersecting US 259 with Kilgore to the south and Longview to the north and US 59 future I-369 with Marshall just to the north and Texarkana further north along US 59 future I-369. I-20 leaves the state of Texas near Waskom and just west of the Shreveport, Bossier City, Louisiana area.

== Exit list ==
County	Location	mi	km	Exit	Destinations	Notes
Reeves		0.00	0.00		I-10 west to I-10 east – El Paso, San Antonio	Western terminus; access to I-10 east via I-10 exit 186
Reeves		0.00	0.00		I-10 east – San Antonio	Eastbound entrance only; I-10 exit 187
Reeves		2.7	4.3	3	Stocks Road	
Reeves		7.0	11.3	7	Johnson Road	
Reeves		12.8	20.6	13	McAlpine Road	
Reeves	Toyah	21.9	35.2	22	FM 2903 – Toyah	
Reeves		29.0	46.7	29	Shaw Road	
Reeves		33.4	53.8	33	FM 869	
Reeves	Pecos	37.6	60.5	37	I-20 BL east – Pecos	
Reeves	Pecos	39.9	64.2	39	SH 17 – Fort Davis, Balmorhea	
Reeves	Pecos	40.5	65.2	40	Country Club Drive	
Reeves	Pecos	41.9	67.4	42	US 285 – Fort Stockton, Carlsbad	
Reeves		43.8	70.5	44	Collie Road	
Ward	Barstow	49.3	79.3	49	FM 516 – Barstow	
Ward	Barstow	52.7	84.8	52	I-20 BL west – Barstow	Westbound exit and eastbound entrance
Ward		58.8	94.6	58	Frontage Road	
Ward	Pyote	65.7	105.7	66	SH 115 / FM 1927 – Pyote, Kermit	
Ward	Pyote	69.8	112.3	70	Spur 65	
Ward	Wickett	73.3	118.0	73	FM 1219 – Wickett	
Ward	Thorntonville	75.5	121.5	76	I-20 BL east – Monahans	
Ward	Thorntonville	77.0	123.9	77	South Colorado Street	Eastbound exit only
Ward	Thorntonville	78.5	126.3	79	Loop 464	Eastbound entrance is via exit 80
Ward	Monahans	79.5	127.9	80	SH 18 – Kermit, Fort Stockton	
Ward	Monahans	81.3	130.8	82	East Monahans Parkway	Westbound exit only
Ward	Monahans	83.2	133.9	83	I-20 BL west – Monahans	
Ward	Monahans	85.2	137.1	86	PR 41 – Monahans Sandhills State Park	
Crane	No major junctions					
Ector		92.5	148.9	93	FM 1053 – Fort Stockton	
Ector	Penwell	100.7	162.1	101	FM 1601 – Penwell	
Ector		104.3	167.9	104	FM 866 – Goldsmith	
Ector	Odessa	108.1	174.0	108	Moss Avenue – Meteor Crater	
Ector	Odessa	111.9	180.1	112	I-20 BL east / FM 1936 – Odessa	
Ector	Odessa	113.3	182.3	113	SH 302 / Loop 338 – Kermit	
Ector	Odessa	114.7	184.6	115	FM 1882 (County Road West)	
Ector	Odessa	116.5	187.5	116	US 385 – Andrews, Crane	Access to Medical Center Hospital and Odessa Regional Medical Center
Ector	Odessa	117.2	188.6	118	FM 3503 / Grandview Avenue	
Ector	Odessa	119.3	192.0	120	JBS Parkway	
Ector	Odessa	120.6	194.1	121	Loop 338 – Odessa	
Midland	Midland	126.5	203.6	126	FM 1788 / SH 349 north – UT Permian Basin CEED	Western end of SH 349 overlap; Signed as exit 128 westbound
Midland	Midland	131.5	211.6	131	SH 158 west / Loop 250 – Midland	Western end of SH 158 overlap
Midland	Midland	133.9	215.5	134	Midkiff Road	
Midland	Midland	134.8	216.9	135	Cotton Flat Road	
Midland	Midland	135.9	218.7	136	Bus. SH 349 / SH 349 south – Rankin, Lamesa	Eastern end of SH 349 overlap
Midland	Midland	136.8	220.2	137	Old Lamesa Road	Signed as exit 137A eastbound
Midland	Midland	137.9	221.9	138	SH 158 east / FM 715 – Garden City, San Angelo	Eastern end of SH 158 overlap; signed as exit 137B eastbound
Midland	Midland	139.5	224.5	140	FM 307 – Greenwood	Eastbound exit and westbound entrance
Midland	Midland	142.2	228.8	143	Loop 250	
Midland	Midland	144.4	232.4	144	I-20 BL west / Loop 250 – Midland	No westbound entrance
Martin		151.7	244.1	151	FM 829	Westbound exit and entrance
Martin	Stanton	153.7	247.4	154	I-20 BL east – Stanton	
Martin	Stanton	155.9	250.9	156	SH 137 – Lamesa	Access to Martin County Hospital
Martin	Stanton	158.4	254.9	158	I-20 BL west – Stanton	
Howard		165.1	265.7	165	FM 818	
Howard		169.4	272.6	169	FM 2599	
Howard		170.9	275.0	171	Moore Field Road	
Howard		172.1	277.0	172	Cauble Road	Westbound exit signed at exit 173
Howard	Big Spring	172.7	277.9	173	US 87 – Lamesa, San Angelo	Relief route for US 87 bypassing Big Spring
Howard	Big Spring	174.0	280.0	174	I-20 BL east – Big Spring	
Howard	Big Spring	176.1	283.4	176	SH 176 – Andrews	
Howard	Big Spring	177.0	284.9	177	Bus. US 87 (Lamesa Highway) – San Angelo, Lamesa	Former alignment of US 87
Howard	Big Spring	177.9	286.3	178	SH 350 – Snyder	
Howard	Big Spring	179.8	289.4	179	I-20 BL west – Big Spring	
Howard	Big Spring	180.5	290.5	181A	FM 700	
Howard	Big Spring	181.3	291.8	181B	Refinery Road	
Howard		182.4	293.5	182	Midway Road	
Howard		184.3	296.6	184	Moss Lake Road – Sand Springs	
Howard		186.3	299.8	186	Salem Road – Sand Springs	
Howard	Coahoma	188.4	303.2	188	FM 820 – Coahoma	
Howard		189.3	304.6	189	McGregor Road	
Howard		190.4	306.4	190	Snyder Field Road	
Howard		192.4	309.6	192	FM 821	
Howard		193.7	311.7	194A	East Howard Field Road	
Howard		195.3	314.3	195	Frontage Road	No eastbound entrance
Mitchell		198.7	319.8	199	Iatan Road	
Mitchell		199.6	321.2	200	Conaway Road	
Mitchell	Westbrook	205.7	331.0	206	I-20 BL east / FM 670 – Westbrook	
Mitchell	Westbrook	206.8	332.8	207	I-20 BL west – Westbrook	
Mitchell		208.9	336.2	209	Dorn Road	
Mitchell		210.0	338.0	210	FM 2836	
Mitchell		212.1	341.3	212	FM 1229	
Mitchell	Colorado City	213.0	342.8	213	I-20 BL east / Enderly Road – Colorado City	
Mitchell	Colorado City	215.0	346.0	215	FM 3525 TDCJ - 80 John Wallace Unit, Dick Ware Unit	
Mitchell	Colorado City	216.1	347.8	216	SH 208 north / Bus. SH 208 – Snyder, Colorado City	Western end of SH 208 overlap
Mitchell	Colorado City	217.1	349.4	217	SH 208 south – San Angelo	Eastern end of SH 208 overlap
Mitchell	Colorado City	218.6	351.8	219A	Country Club Road	Signed as exit 219 eastbound
Mitchell	Colorado City	219.1	352.6	219B	I-20 BL west – Colorado City	Eastbound exit is via exit 219
Mitchell		219.8	353.7	220	FM 1899	
Mitchell		221.0	355.7	221	Lasky Road	
Mitchell		222.7	358.4	223	Lucas Road	
Mitchell	Loraine	224.2	360.8	224	I-20 BL east – Loraine	
Mitchell	Loraine	225.1	362.3	225	FM 644 south	
Mitchell	Loraine	225.9	363.6	226A	FM 644 north	Eastbound exit is via exit 225
Mitchell	Loraine	226.4	364.4	226B	I-20 BL west / Wimberley Road	
Mitchell		226.9	365.2	227	Norrell Road	
Nolan		229.9	370.0	230	FM 1230	
Nolan	Roscoe	234.7	377.7	235	I-20 BS east – Roscoe	
Nolan	Roscoe	236.0	379.8	236	FM 608 – Roscoe	
Nolan	Roscoe	237.0	381.4	237	Cemetery Road	
Nolan	Roscoe	238.0	383.0	238A	US 84 west – Lubbock, Snyder	Western end of US 84 overlap; no eastbound exit
Nolan		238.1	383.2	238B	Blackland Road	
Nolan		238.4	383.7	238C	Frontage Road	Eastbound exit and entrance
Nolan		239.1	384.8	239	May Road	No access across I-20
Nolan	Sweetwater	239.9	386.1	240	Loop 170	
Nolan	Sweetwater	240.3	386.7	241	I-20 BL east – Sweetwater	
Nolan	Sweetwater	241.6	388.8	242	Hopkins Road	
Nolan	Sweetwater	242.8	390.7	243	Hillsdale Road, Robert Lee Street	
Nolan	Sweetwater	244.3	393.2	244	SH 70 south / Bus. SH 70 – Sweetwater, San Angelo	Western end of SH 70 overlap
Nolan	Sweetwater	245.2	394.6	245	Arizona Avenue	Westbound exit only
Nolan	Sweetwater	245.7	395.4	246	Alabama Avenue	
Nolan	Sweetwater	247.5	398.3	247	I-20 BL west / SH 70 north – Sweetwater, Roby	Eastern end of SH 70 overlap
Nolan		249.0	400.7	249	FM 1856	
Nolan		250.9	403.8	251	Eskota Road	
Nolan		254.8	410.1	255	Adrian Road	
Nolan		256.1	412.2	256	Stink Creek Road	
Nolan		258.3	415.7	258	White Flat Road	
Nolan		259.3	417.3	259	Sylvester Road	
Taylor	Trent	260.7	419.6	261	I-20 BL east – Trent	
Taylor	Trent	261.9	421.5	262	FM 1085	
Taylor	Trent	262.6	422.6	263	I-20 BL west – Trent	
Taylor		263.7	424.4	264	Noodle Dome Road	
Taylor		266.0	428.1	266	Derstine Road	
Taylor	Merkel	267.2	430.0	267	I-20 BL east – Merkel	
Taylor	Merkel	268.5	432.1	269	FM 126	
Taylor	Merkel	270.1	434.7	270	I-20 BL west / FM 1235 – Merkel	
Taylor		272.1	437.9	272	Wimberly Road	
Taylor		273.8	440.6	274	Wells Lane	
Taylor	Tye	276.8	445.5	277	I-20 BL east / FM 707 – Tye	
Taylor	Tye	277.8	447.1	278	I-20 BL west – Tye	
Taylor	Abilene	278.4	448.0	279	I-20 BL east / US 84 east – Abilene	Eastern end of US 84 overlap; no westbound exit
Taylor	Abilene	279.3	449.5	280	Fulwiler Road	Eastbound exit and westbound entrance
Taylor	Abilene	280.3	451.1	281	FM 3438 south (Hayter Road) – Dyess AFB	Northern terminus of FM 3438
Taylor	Abilene	281.4	452.9	282	Shirley Road, Ambler Avenue	
Taylor	Abilene	282.9– 283.4	455.3– 456.1	283	US 83 / US 277 – San Angelo, Ballinger, Anson	Signed as exits 283A (south) and 283B (north)
Taylor	Abilene	284.4	457.7	285	Old Anson Road – Impact	
Taylor	Abilene	285.4– 285.8	459.3– 460.0	286A	Bus. US 83 – Abilene	Signed as exits 286A (south) and 286B (north) eastbound, access to Hendrick Medical Center and Abilene Regional Medical Center
Taylor	Abilene	285.9	460.1	286C	FM 600	
Taylor	Abilene	286.4	460.9	288	SH 351 – Albany, Abilene Christian University	
Taylor	Abilene	288.1	463.7	290	Loop 322 to SH 36 – Cross Plains, Airport	
Taylor	Abilene	291.2	468.6	292A	I-20 BL west – Abilene	No direct westbound entrance
Taylor	Abilene	292.1	470.1	292B	Elmdale Road	
Callahan		294.1	473.3	294	Buck Creek Road	
Callahan		296.6	477.3	297	FM 603	
Callahan	Clyde	298.8	480.9	299	FM 1707 (Hays Road)	
Callahan	Clyde	299.8	482.5	300	FM 604 – Clyde	
Callahan	Clyde	301.0	484.4	301	Cherry Lane	
Callahan		303.1	487.8	303	Union Hill Road	
Callahan	Baird	305.2	491.2	306	I-20 BL east / FM 2047 – Baird	
Callahan	Baird	307.0	494.1	307	US 283 – Albany, Coleman	
Callahan	Baird	307.9	495.5	308	I-20 BL west – Baird	
Callahan		309.6	498.3	310	Finley Road	
Callahan		312.3	502.6	313	FM 2228	
Callahan		315.3	507.4	316	Brushy Creek Road	
Callahan	Putnam	318.5	512.6	319	FM 880 south – Putnam, Cross Plains	Western end of FM 880 overlap
Callahan	Putnam	319.7	514.5	320	FM 880 north / FM 2945 east – Moran	Eastern end of FM 880 overlap
Callahan		321.6	517.6	322	Cooper Creek Road	
Eastland		323.9	521.3	324	Scranton Road	
Eastland	Cisco	329.6	530.4	330	SH 206 – Cross Plains, Coleman	
Eastland	Cisco	331.6	533.7	332	US 183 – Breckenridge, Cisco, Brownwood	
Eastland		336.3	541.2	337	Spur 490	
Eastland	Eastland	339.8	546.9	340	SH 6 – Gorman, Eastland, Breckenridge	Access to Eastland Memorial Hospital
Eastland	Eastland	342.9	551.8	343	SH 112 / FM 570 – Lake Leon	Access to Eastland Memorial Hospital
Eastland		344.9	555.1	345	FM 3363 – Olden	Eastbound exit and westbound entrance
Eastland		346.5	557.6	347	FM 3363 – Olden	Westbound exit and eastbound entrance
Eastland	Ranger	349.0	561.7	349	Loop 254 / FM 2461 – Lake Leon, Ranger	
Eastland	Ranger	350.0	563.3	351	Desdemona Boulevard	Eastbound exit and westbound entrance
Eastland	Ranger	351.5	565.7	352	Blundell Street	Westbound exit and eastbound entrance
Eastland		354.3	570.2	354	Loop 254 west – Ranger	
Eastland		358.2	576.5	358	Frontage Road	Westbound exit and eastbound entrance
Eastland		360.6	580.3	361	SH 16 – Strawn, De Leon	
Eastland		362.3	583.1	363	Tudor Road	
Erath		366.3	589.5	367	SH 108 north – Mingus, Thurber	Western end of SH 108 overlap
Palo Pinto		369.4	594.5	370	SH 108 south / FM 919 – Gordon, Stephenville	Eastern end of SH 108 overlap
Palo Pinto		372.5	599.5	373	SH 193 – Gordon	
Palo Pinto		375.4	604.1	376	Panama Road, Blue Flat Road	
Palo Pinto		380.0	611.6	380	FM 4 – Palo Pinto, Lipan, Santo	
Palo Pinto		386.0	621.2	386	US 281 – Stephenville, Mineral Wells	
Parker		391.0	629.3	391	Gilbert Pit Road	
Parker		392.8	632.2	394	FM 113 – Millsap	
Parker		396.9	638.7	397	FM 1189 – Brock	
Parker		401.8	646.6	402	Spur 312 east – Weatherford	Eastbound exit and westbound entrance
Parker		402.7	648.1	403	Dennis Road	Westbound exit and eastbound entrance
Parker		404.3	650.7	405	Old Brock Road, Ric Williamson Memorial Highway	
Parker	Weatherford	405.5	652.6	406	Old Dennis Road, South Bowie Drive	
Parker	Weatherford	406.6	654.4	407	FM 1884 (Bethel Road) / Tin Top Road	Westbound exit is via exit 408
Parker	Weatherford	407.2	655.3	408	SH 171 / FM 51 – Granbury, Cleburne	
Parker	Weatherford	408.6	657.6	409A	Holland Lake Road, Fossil Hill Road	Westbound exit and eastbound entrance
Parker	Weatherford	407.7	656.1	409	FM 2552 north (Santa Fe Drive) / Clear Lake Road	
Parker	Weatherford	410.2	660.2	410	East Bankhead Drive	
Parker	Weatherford	411.4	662.1	411	Center Point Road	
Parker		412.6	664.0	412	Frontage Road	Eastbound exit only
Parker	Hudson Oaks	412.9	664.5	413	Lake Shore Drive	Eastbound exit and westbound entrance
Parker	Hudson Oaks	414.0	666.3	414	US 180 – Weatherford, Mineral Wells	Westbound exit and eastbound entrance
Parker		414.3	666.8	415	FM 5 (Mikus Road) – Annetta	
Parker	Willow Park	416.9	670.9	418	Ranch House Road – Willow Park	
Parker	Willow Park	418.7	673.8	420	FM 1187 / FM 3325 – Aledo	
Parker		420.5	676.7	421	I-30 east – Downtown Fort Worth	Eastbound exit and westbound entrance; left exit; western terminus of I-30
Parker				423	Walsh Ranch Parkway	Exit opened in March 2026
Tarrant		424.5	683.2	425	Markum Ranch Road	
Tarrant		425.5	684.8	426	RM 2871	
Tarrant	Benbrook	426.9	687.0	428	I-820 north	I-820 exit 0
Tarrant	Benbrook	427.2	687.5	429A	US 377 (Benbrook Boulevard) – Granbury	
Tarrant	Benbrook	428.8	690.1	429B	Winscott Road	
Tarrant	Fort Worth	430.9	693.5	431	Bryant Irvin Road	
Tarrant	Fort Worth	432.1	695.4	432A	SH 183 west (Southwest Boulevard)	Westbound exit and eastbound entrance
Tarrant	Fort Worth	431.2	693.9	432B	Chisholm Trail Parkway	Signed as exit 432 eastbound
Tarrant	Fort Worth	431.3	694.1	433	Hulen Street, South Drive – TCU	
Tarrant	Fort Worth	432.9	696.7	434A	Granbury Road, South Drive	
Tarrant	Fort Worth	433.3	697.3	434B	Trail Lake Drive, Westcreek Drive	
Tarrant	Fort Worth	434.5	699.3	435	McCart Avenue, Westcreek Drive	
Tarrant	Fort Worth	435.2	700.4	436A	FM 731 (Crowley Road) / James Avenue	
Tarrant	Fort Worth	435.6	701.0	436B	Hemphill Street	
Tarrant	Fort Worth	436.3	702.2	437	I-35W – Denton, Waco	I-35W exit 45A-B
Tarrant	Fort Worth	437.1	703.4	438	Oak Grove Road	
Tarrant	Fort Worth	438.3	705.4	439	Campus Drive	
Tarrant	Forest Hill	439.0	706.5	440A	Wichita Street	
Tarrant	Forest Hill	439.5	707.3	440B	Forest Hill Drive	
Tarrant	Forest Hill	440.8	709.4	441	Anglin Drive	
Tarrant	Kennedale	441.5	710.5	442A	Bus. US 287 (Mansfield Highway)	
Tarrant	Kennedale	441.7	710.8	442B	I-820 north / US 287 north – Downtown Fort Worth	Western end of US 287 overlap, I-820 exit 34A
Tarrant	Arlington	442.9	712.8	443	Bowman Springs Road	Westbound exit and eastbound entrance
Tarrant	Arlington	443.2	713.3	444	US 287 south / Little Road – Waxahachie	Eastern end of US 287 overlap
Tarrant	Arlington	444.5	715.4	445	Green Oaks Boulevard, Little Road	
Tarrant	Arlington	445.4	716.8	447	Kelly–Elliott Road, Park Springs Road	
Tarrant	Arlington	446.9	719.2	448	Bowen Road	
Tarrant	Arlington	447.8– 447.9	720.7– 720.8	449	FM 157 (Cooper Street) – UT Arlington	Signed as exits 449A (south) and 449B (north) eastbound
Tarrant	Arlington	449.1	722.8	450	Matlock Road	Access to Medical Center of Arlington
Tarrant	Arlington	450.3	724.7	451	Collins Street, New York Avenue	
Tarrant	Arlington	451.5	726.6		Bardin Road	Eastbound exit only
Tarrant	Arlington	451.9– 452.2	727.3– 727.7	453	SH 360 – D/FW Airport	Signed as exits 453A (north) and 453B (south)
Tarrant	Grand Prairie	453.2	729.4	454	Great Southwest Parkway	
Dallas	Grand Prairie	454.0	730.6	455A	Pres. George Bush Turnpike north	
Dallas	Grand Prairie	454.3	731.1	455B	SH 161 / Lake Ridge Parkway	
Dallas	Grand Prairie	455.4	732.9	456	Carrier Parkway	
Dallas	Grand Prairie	456.6	734.8	457	FM 1382 (Belt Line Road) – Grand Prairie, Cedar Hill	
Dallas	Dallas	457.5	736.3	458	Mountain Creek Parkway	
Dallas	Dallas	458.6	738.0	460	Spur 408 north	
Dallas	Duncanville	460.1	740.5	461	Cedar Ridge Drive	
Dallas	Duncanville	461.2	742.2	462	Duncanville Road, North Main Street	
Dallas	Duncanville	462.3	744.0	463A	Cockrell Hill Road, Camp Wisdom Road	
Dallas	Dallas	463.0– 463.2	745.1– 745.4	464	US 67 – Dallas, Cleburne	Signed as exits 464A (north) and 464B (south)
Dallas	Dallas	464.1	746.9	465	Wheatland Road, Hampton Road	Access to Charlton Methodist Hospital
Dallas	Dallas	464.8	748.0	466	South Polk Street	
Dallas	Dallas	466.4– 466.6	750.6– 750.9	467	I-35E (US 77) – Dallas, Waco	Signed as exits 467A (north) and 467B (south); I-35E exits 418A-B
Dallas	Lancaster	467.4	752.2	468	Houston School Road	
Dallas	Dallas	468.0	753.2	470	SH 342 (Lancaster Road)	
Dallas	Dallas	470.8	757.7	472	Bonnie View Road	
Dallas	Dallas	472.0	759.6	473A	J. J. Lemmon Road	Eastbound exit and westbound entrance
Dallas	Dallas	472.3– 472.5	760.1– 760.4	473	I-45 – Downtown Dallas, Houston	Signed as exits 473B (south) and 473C (north); I-45 exits 276A-B
Dallas	Hutchins	472.9	761.1	474	SH 310	Westbound exit and eastbound entrance
Dallas	Dallas	475.6	765.4	476	Dowdy Ferry Road	
Dallas	Dallas	476.6	767.0	477	St. Augustine Road	
Dallas	Dallas	478.7	770.4	478	Haymarket Road	Eastbound exit and westbound entrance
Dallas	Dallas	479.2– 479.4	771.2– 771.5	479	US 175 – Dallas, Kaufman	Signed as exits 479A (west) and 479B (east)
Dallas	Balch Springs	480.0	772.5	480B	I-635 north – Mesquite, Garland	I-635 exit 1C
Dallas	Balch Springs	480.5	773.3	480A	Kleberg Road	Westbound exit and eastbound entrance
Dallas	Balch Springs	481.3	774.6	481	Seagoville Road	
Dallas	Balch Springs	482.4	776.3	482	Belt Line Road, Lasater Road	
Dallas	Mesquite	483.3	777.8	483	Lawson Road, Lasater Road, Lumley Road	
Kaufman	Mesquite	487.3	784.2	487	FM 740 – Forney	
Kaufman		490.2	788.9	490	FM 741	
Kaufman		491.1	790.3	491	FM 2932 / Helms Trail	
Kaufman	Talty	493.2	793.7	493	FM 1641	
Kaufman	Terrell	497.9	801.3	498	FM 148	
Kaufman	Terrell	499.3	803.5	499A	Spur 557 west to US 80 – Dallas	Westbound exit and eastbound entrance
Kaufman	Terrell	499.0	803.1	499B	Rose Hill Road	
Kaufman	Terrell	500.7	805.8	501	SH 34 – Terrell, Kaufman	Access to Terrell Municipal Airport
Kaufman	Terrell	502.5	808.7	503	Wilson Road	
Kaufman		505.9	814.2	506	FM 429 (College Mound Road) / FM 2728 – Trinity Valley Community College	
Kaufman		508.9	819.0	509	Hiram Road	
Kaufman		512.0	824.0	512	FM 2965 (Hiram-Wills Point Road)	
Van Zandt		516.5	831.2	516	FM 47 – Wills Point	
Van Zandt		519.1	835.4	519	Turner–Hayden Road	
Van Zandt		521.0	838.5	521	Myrtle Springs Road, Myrtle Cemetery Road	
Van Zandt	Canton	522.9	841.5	523	SH 64 – Canton, Wills Point	
Van Zandt	Canton	525.8	846.2	526	FM 859 – Canton, Edgewood	
Van Zandt	Canton	526.2	846.8	527	SH 19 – Emory, Canton	
Van Zandt	Canton	528.3	850.2	528	FM 17 – Grand Saline	
Van Zandt	Canton	530.1	853.1	530	FM 1255 – Canton	
Van Zandt		533.2	858.1	533	Colfax Oakland Road	
Van Zandt		536.0	862.6	536	Tank Farm Road	
Van Zandt		536.8	863.9	537	FM 16 / FM 773 – Van, Ben Wheeler	
Van Zandt	Van	540.3	869.5	540	FM 314 – Van, Edom	
Smith		544.0	875.5	544	Willow Branch Road	
Smith		547.7	881.4	548	SH 110 – Grand Saline, Tyler, Van	
Smith	Lindale	551.8	888.0	552	FM 849 – Hideaway	
Smith	Lindale	552.8	889.6	553	Loop 49 Toll – Mineola, Tyler	
Smith	Lindale	553.9	891.4	554	Harvey Road	
Smith	Lindale	555.7	894.3	556	US 69 – Lindale, Mineola, Tyler	
Smith		556.3	895.3	557	Jim Hogg Road	
Smith		560.6	902.2	560	Lavender Road	
Smith		561.9	904.3	562	FM 14 – Hawkins, Tyler, Tyler State Park	
Smith		564.9	909.1	565	FM 2015 (Driskill Lake Road)	
Smith		567.5	913.3	567	SH 155 – UT Health Center, Winona	
Smith		570.8	918.6	571A	US 271 – Gladewater, Tyler	
Smith		571.6	919.9	571B	FM 757 (Starrville Omen Road)	
Smith		575.2	925.7	575	Barber Road	
Smith–Gregg county line		579.4	932.5	579	Joy–Wright Mountain Road	
Gregg		582.1	936.8	582	FM 3053 – Liberty City, Overton	
Gregg		583.1	938.4	583	SH 135 – Kilgore, Gladewater, Overton	
Gregg	Kilgore	586.8	944.4	587	SH 42 – Kilgore, White Oak	
Gregg	Kilgore	588.7– 589.1	947.4– 948.1	589	US 259 south / SH 31 – Kilgore, Henderson, Downtown Longview	Western end of US 259 overlap; signed as exits 589A (south/west) and 589B (east) eastbound
Gregg		591.1	951.3	591	FM 2011 / FM 2087	
Gregg	Longview	595.2– 595.6	957.9– 958.5	595	SH 322 south (Estes Parkway) / Loop 281 north – Longview	Signed as exits 595A (south) and 595B (north) eastbound
Gregg	Longview	596.0	959.2	596	US 259 north / SH 149 (Eastman Road) – Carthage	Eastern end of US 259 overlap, access to Good Shepherd Medical Center and Longview Regional Medical Center
Harrison		598.5	963.2	599	Loop 281 / FM 968	
Harrison		603.8	971.7	604	FM 450 – Hallsville	
Harrison		610.3	982.2	610	FM 3251	
Harrison		613.7	987.7	614	SH 43 – Marshall, Caddo Lake, Henderson	
Harrison	Marshall	616.7	992.5	617	US 59 – Marshall, Carthage	
Harrison	Marshall			618	I-369 / Loop 390	Proposed; I-369 exits 42A west and 42B east
Harrison		620.4	998.4	620	FM 31 – Elysian Fields	
Harrison		623.5	1,003.4	624	FM 2199 – Scottsville	
Harrison		628.2	1,011.0	628	US 80 west / Frontage Road	Western end of US 80 overlap
Harrison		632.7	1,018.2	633	US 80 east / FM 9 / FM 134 – Waskom, Caddo Lake	Eastern end of US 80 overlap
Harrison	Waskom	634.6	1,021.3	635	Spur 156 north – Waskom	
Texas–Louisiana line		636.08	1,023.67	Texas Travel Information Center (westbound only)		
Texas–Louisiana line		636.08	1,023.67		I-20 east – Shreveport	Continuation into Louisiana
1.000 mi = 1.609 km; 1.000 km = 0.621 mi: Concurrency terminus; Electronic toll collection; Incomplete access; Unopened

== Interstate 820 ==
Interstate 820
- Location: Tarrant County
- Length: 35.173 mi (56.605 km)
- Existed: October 1, 1959–present

Interstate 820 is an auxiliary route of I-20 in Fort Worth, Texas, of approximately 35.173 miles (56.605 km) around the city. Exit numbers begin at its interchange with I-20 in southwest Fort Worth and continue in a clockwise direction around the city until it ends at its interchange with I-20 in southeast Fort Worth. A portion of I-820 in the northeast quadrant is cosigned with State Highway 121 (SH 121) as well as SH 183.

== Business routes ==
All of the business loops within Texas are maintained by the Texas Department of Transportation (TxDOT). I-20 has 15 business loops in the state, all located in western Texas. Along I-20, TxDOT identifies each business route as Business Interstate 20 (Bus. I-20) followed by an alphabetic suffix. Along Texas Interstates, the alphabetic suffixes on business route names ascend eastward and northward. There are gaps in the alphabetic values to allow for future system expansion. The alphabetic naming suffixes are included as small letters on the bottom of route shields.

State Highway Loop 254 (Loop 254) takes the place of a business route in Ranger, Texas, and follows the original route of US 80.

I-20 business routes in Texas generally follow the path of the former US 80 through the central portions of towns now bypassed by the Interstate route.

== Notes ==
Interstate 20
Previous state: Terminus	Texas	Next state: Louisiana
