= Orla, Texas =

Orla
- Unincorporated town
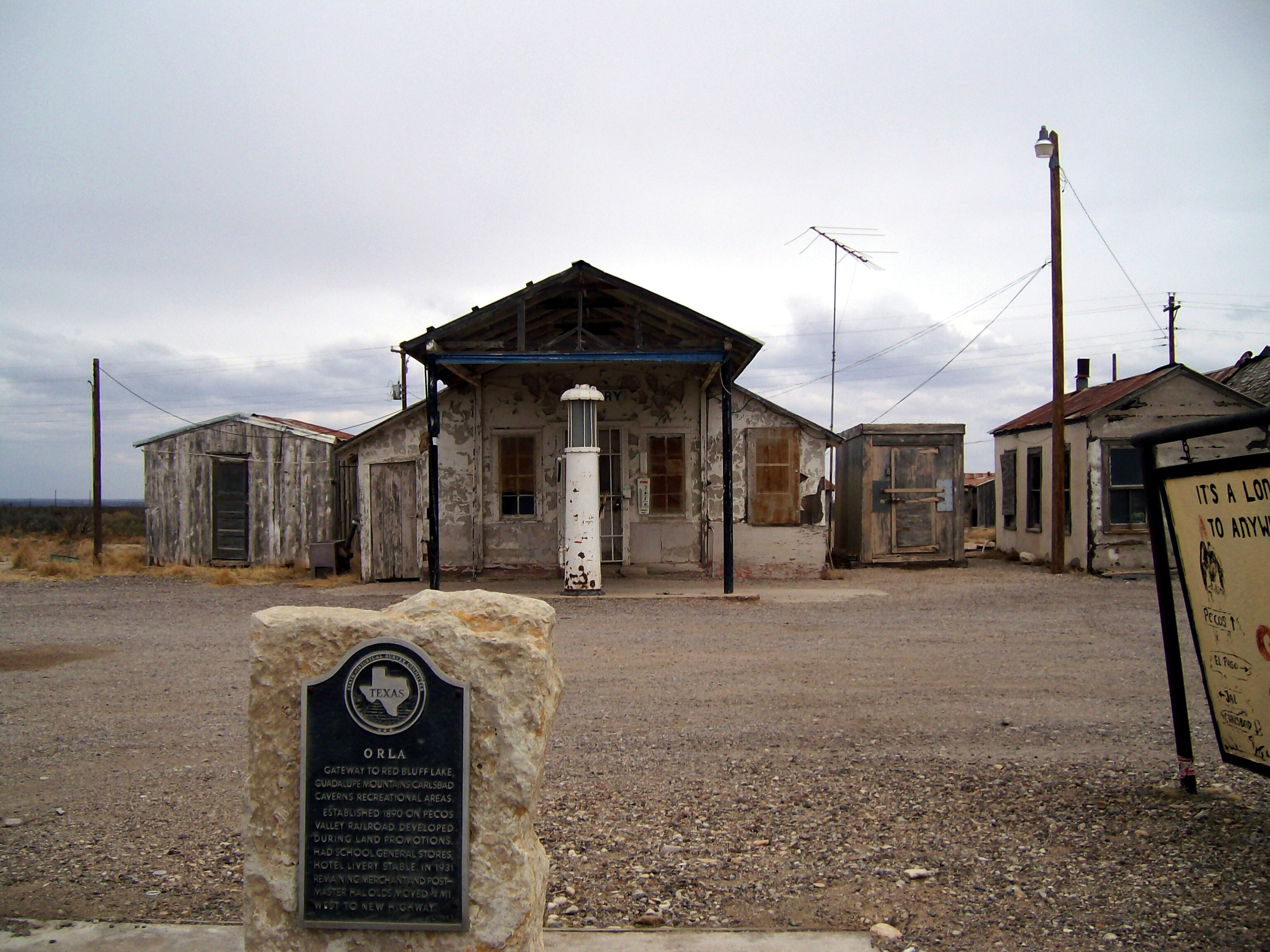
- Orla, Texas in 2008

- Location within the state of Texas
- Coordinates: 31°49′30″N 103°54′32″W
- Country: United States
- State: Texas
- County: Reeves

Population (2000)
  - Total: 2
- Time zone: UTC-6 (Central (CST))
  - Summer (DST): UTC-5 (CDT)

Orla is an unincorporated de facto ghost town in Reeves County, Texas, United States. It lies approximately 38 miles (61 km) north of Pecos. Orla is believed to have a population of around 2 permanent residents and has its own post office, located on U.S. Route 285. The post office was established 26 December 1906, with Joshua D. McAdams as first postmaster.

== History ==
Orla was founded in 1890, and served as a section house for the newly built Pecos Valley Railroad, incorporated by John J. Hagerman, an American industrialist, to link Eddy, New Mexico (now Carlsbad), with Pecos, Texas. The population remained small until World War II, when the town's population finally grew, and the number of businesses increased to two to serve the population of nearly 60 residents. The population reached a high of around 250 people when oil, gas, and sulfur activity brought more workers to the region in the 1960s.

Today, due to the new oil price increase, the town has been brought back, with three new gas stations, two restaurants, multiple camps and worker housing units, and varying construction companies.

== Climate ==
This area has a large amount of sunshine year-round due to its stable descending air and high pressure. According to the Köppen climate classification, Orla has a desert climate, Bwh on climate maps.
