= Farm to Market Road 1053 =

Road in Texas, United States

Farm to Market Road 1053

Route information
- Maintained by TxDOT
- Length: 59.378 mi (95.560 km)
- Existed: 1948–present

Major junctions
- South end: I-10 BL / US 285 / US 385 in Fort Stockton
- I-10 / US 67 in Fort Stockton; FM 1450; FM 11 in Imperial; SH 329 in Tubbs Corner; FM 1233
- North end: I-20 near Penwell

Location
- Country: United States
- State: Texas
- Counties: Pecos, Crane, Ector

Highway system
- Highways in Texas; Interstate; US; State; Former; Toll; Loops; Spurs; FM/RM; Park; Rec
← FM 1052	→ FM 1054

Farm to Market Road 1053 (FM 1053) is a Farm to Market Road in the U.S. state of Texas maintained by the Texas Department of Transportation (TxDOT). The road, located in Pecos, Crane, and Ector counties, begins along the concurrent routes of Business Interstate 10-G (Bus. I-10-G), U.S. Route 285 (US 285), and U.S. Route 385 (US 385) in the city of Fort Stockton and continues to the north ending at Interstate 20 (I-20) near Penwell. The road passes through the towns of Imperial, where it intersects FM 11, and Tubbs Corner, where it crosses State Highway 329 (SH 329). The road also has major intersections with I-10 / US 67 in Fort Stockton as well as FM 1450 and FM 1233.

== Route description ==
The 59.4-mile (95.6 km) two-lane road begins in Pecos County at the combined routes of Bus. I-10-G, US 285, and US 385 along Dickinson Boulevard in Fort Stockton. The route proceeds along North Main Street through the north side of Fort Stockton and turns to the northeast before intersecting the I-10 / US 67 bypass along the edge of town. FM 1450 branches off to the northwest toward Pecos as FM 1053 continues to the northeast. The road intersects FM 11 in Imperial before crossing the Pecos River into Crane County. The road intersects SH 329 in Tubbs Corner and turns to the northwest crossing FM 1233 and entering Ector County before terminating at I-20 approximately 7.5 miles (12.1 km) west of Penwell.

== History ==
FM 1053 was designated along its current alignment on June 1, 1948. The road formerly terminated at US 290 along the current Bus. I-10-G at its south end and US 80 at its north end, which were in western Texas the progenitor routes of I-10 and I-20 respectively.

== Major intersections ==
County	Location	mi	km	Destinations	Notes
Pecos	Fort Stockton	0.0	0.0	I-10 BL / US 285 / US 385 (Dickenson Blvd.) – Sanderson, Marathon, Pecos, McCamey	Southern terminus
Pecos	Fort Stockton	1.0	1.6	I-10 / US 67 – Van Horn, Alpine, San Antonio, McCamey	
Pecos		22.7	36.5	FM 1450 – Pecos	
Pecos	Imperial	29.8	48.0	FM 11 – Grandfalls, Bakersfield	
Crane	Tubbs Corner	38.7	62.3	SH 329 – Grandfalls, Crane	
Crane		46.2	74.4	FM 1233	
Ector		59.5	95.8	I-20 – Monahans, Odessa	Northern terminus
1.000 mi = 1.609 km; 1.000 km = 0.621 mi
