= Business routes of Interstate 10 =

Interstate 10 Business

Location
- Country: United States

Highway system
- Interstate Highway System; Main; Auxiliary; Suffixed; Business; Future

Interstate business routes are roads connecting a central or commercial district of a city or town with an Interstate bypass. These roads typically follow along local streets often along a former US route or state highway that had been replaced by an Interstate. Interstate business route reassurance markers are signed as either loops or spurs using a green shield shaped and numbered like the shield of the parent Interstate highway.

Along Interstate 10 (I-10), business routes are found in the four westernmost states through which I-10 passes: California, Arizona, New Mexico, and the far western region of Texas beyond the Pecos River. Although I-10 is a transcontinental highway, none of the states to the east along the Interstate have yet to designate I-10 business routes.

Some states regard Interstate business routes as fully integrated within their state highway system while other states consider them to be either local roads to be maintained by county or municipal authorities or a hybrid of state and local control.

Although the public may differentiate between different business routes by the number of the parent route and the location of the route, there is no uniform naming convention. Each state highway department internally uses its own designations to identify segments within its jurisdiction.

== California ==
Interstate business routes in California are assigned by the California Department of Transportation (Caltrans), but are not maintained by Caltrans unless they overlap other routes of the state highway system. Local authorities may request route assignment from the Caltrans Transportation System Information Program, and all requests require approval of the executive committee of the American Association of State Highway and Transportation Officials (AASHTO).

=== Blythe business loop ===
Interstate 10 Business
- Location: Blythe, California
- Length: 7.9 mi (12.7 km)

Interstate 10 Business is a business loop of I-10 at Blythe in Riverside County. The route begins at I-10 exit 236 and goes to the north along Neighbours Boulevard. The route turns to the east along Hobsonway through town, then crosses underneath I-10 just before the Colorado River at the Arizona state line and emerges from the underpass as Riviera Drive where the route reconnects with I-10 at exit 243. The business loop has major intersections with US Route 95 (US 95) and California State Route 78 (SR 78).

The route was formerly designated as part of US 60/US 70 except along Neighbours Boulevard. The eastern part of the route also conveyed US 95.

Major intersections
The entire route is in Blythe, Riverside County.

mi	km	Destinations	Notes
0.00	0.00	I-10 (Pearl Harbor Memorial Highway) / SR 78 west	Western terminus; I-10 exit 236; highway continues as SR 78
5.3	8.5	US 95 (Intake Boulevard) to I-10	
7.9	12.7	I-10 (US 95)	Eastern terminus; I-10 west exit 242, east exit 243; road continues west as Donlon Street
1.000 mi = 1.609 km; 1.000 km = 0.621 mi

== Arizona ==
The business loops within Arizona are maintained by the Arizona Department of Transportation (ADOT) and by municipal authorities. I-10 has five business loops within the state including one in La Paz County, the westernmost in Arizona through which I-10 passes, and four in Cochise County, the easternmost. ADOT identifies Interstate business loops as State Business Routes followed by the number of the parent Interstate. Therefore, all I-10 business loops in Arizona carry the unsigned designation of Arizona State Route 10 Business (or State Business Route 10). Individual loops along an Interstate are designated by adding parenthetical numbers that increase eastward and northward. Gaps in numbering represent removal of former routes or potential expansion. Many of the business loops are sections of highways which preceded I-10, such as US 60, US 70, US 80 and Arizona State Route 86 (SR 86).

=== Quartzsite business loop ===
Interstate 10 Business
- State Business Route 10 (1)
- Location: Quartzsite, Arizona
- Length: 2.94 mi (4.73 km)
- Existed: 1991–present

A map of the Quartzsite business loop. The route is highlighted in red.

State Business Route 10 (1) (also known as SR 10 Bus.) is a business loop of I-10 at Quartzsite in La Paz County operated since 1991. The 2.9-mile (4.7 km) route, which follows along the local streets Quartzsite Boulevard, Main Street, and Riggles Avenue, begins at exit 17 of I-10 and US 95 west of town and ends at exit 24 of I-10 east of town. Between its termini, the route has a major intersection with SR 95 where it ends a concurrency with US 95.

The route was originally designated along part of US 60 and US 70.

Major intersections
The entire route is in Quartzsite, La Paz County.

mi	km	Destinations	Notes
17.45	28.08	Dome Rock Road / Kuehn Street	Western terminus
17.53– 17.61	28.21– 28.34	I-10 / US 95 north – Phoenix, Los Angeles	West end of US 95 overlap; I-10 exit 17
17.67	28.44	East end state maintenance	
18.92	30.45	West end state maintenance	
18.96	30.51	US 95 south (Central Boulevard south) / SR 95 north (Central Boulevard north) – Yuma, Parker	East end of US 95 overlap; southern terminus of SR 95
18.99	30.56	East end state maintenance	
19.55	31.46	West end state maintenance	
20.07– 20.15	32.30– 32.43	I-10 – Phoenix, Los Angeles	I-10 exit 19
20.42	32.86	Riggles Avenue south	Continuation south beyond eastern terminus
1.000 mi = 1.609 km; 1.000 km = 0.621 mi: Concurrency terminus

=== Phoenix business loop ===
Interstate 10 Business
- State Business Route 10 (Phoenix)
- Location: Phoenix, Arizona
- Existed: ????–c. 1990

State Business Route 10 (Phoenix) (also known as SR 10 Bus.) was a business loop of I-10 at Phoenix, in Maricopa County, decommissioned circa 1990. Prior to the completion of I-10 through Phoenix, this business loop connected the eastern and western segments of the Interstate on a route through Downtown Phoenix.

Prior to its decommissioning, the route began at I-10 exit 142 (27th Avenue), heading south before turning east at Van Buren Street. At the five-legged intersection with Grand Avenue and 7th Avenue, I-10 BL began a concurrency with US 60 and US 89. This concurrency ended as I-10 BL turned right at 44th Street, heading south again before terminating at I-10 exit 153 (48th Street).

The 44th Street leg of the Phoenix I-10 BL has since been replaced by part of the Hohokam Expressway (SR 143).

Major intersections
Major highway intersections as listed shortly before I-10 BL was decommissioned in 1990. The entire route was in Maricopa County.

Location	mi	km	Destinations	Notes
Phoenix	0.00	0.00	I-10 west (Papago Freeway) – Los Angeles	Western terminus; road continued north as 27th Avenue
Phoenix			I-17 (Black Canyon Freeway)	
Phoenix			SR 85 south (17th Avenue)	West end of overlap with SR 85; former US 80 west
Phoenix			US 60 west / US 89 north / SR 93 north (Grand Avenue) / SR 85 ends / 7th Avenue	East end of overlap with SR 85; northern terminus of SR 85; west end of overlap with US 60 / US 89; southern terminus of SR 93; former US 70 west
Phoenix			US 60 east / US 89 south (Van Buren Street)	East end of overlap with US 60 / US 89; former US 70 / US 80 east
Phoenix–Tempe line			I-10 (Maricopa Freeway) – Tucson	Eastern terminus; road continued south as 48th Street
1.000 mi = 1.609 km; 1.000 km = 0.621 mi: Concurrency terminus

=== Tucson business loop ===
Interstate 10 Business
- State Business Route 10 (2)
- Location: Tucson, Arizona
- Length: 5.75 mi (9.25 km)
- Existed: 1972–2001

A map of the Tucson business loop. The route is highlighted in red.

State Business Route 10 (2) (also known as SR 10 Bus.) was a business loop of I-10 at Tucson in Pima County operated between 1972 and 2001. The 5.8-mile (9.3 km) route followed Tucson–Benson Highway through the south end of Tucson, starting at exit 262 in town and ended at exit 267 east of town. Between its termini, the route made a quick jog down Irvington Road near Tucson Boulevard to stay on Benson Highway and used a small section of Valencia Road at the end of Benson Highway to access exit 267.

The route was formerly designated as part of US 80 and SR 86. Maintenance of the route was transferred to the city of Tucson upon decommissioning.

Major intersections
The entire route was in Pima County.

Location	mi	km	Destinations	Notes
Tucson	247.60	398.47	I-10 east	Western terminus; eastbound exit only; no access to I-10 from I-10 BL; no access from I-10 west to I-10BL
Tucson	247.95	399.04	Park Avenue to I-10 – Casa Grande	Access to I-10 via Park Avenue and north frontage road; access to I-10 BL from I-10 west was at this exit
	253.35	407.73	I-10 – Benson	Eastern terminus; road continued as Valencia Road
1.000 mi = 1.609 km; 1.000 km = 0.621 mi: Incomplete access

=== Benson business loop ===
Interstate 10 Business
- State Business Route 10 (3)
- Location: Benson, Arizona
- Length: 3.51 mi (5.65 km)
- Existed: 1974–present

A map of the Benson business loop. The route is highlighted in red.

State Business Route 10 (3) (also known as SR 10 Bus.) is a business loop of I-10 at Benson in Cochise County operated since 1974. The 3.5-mile (5.6 km) route follows along Benson's Fourth Street beginning at exit 303 of I-10 west of town and ends at exit 306 of I-10 east of town. Between its termini, the route has a major intersection with SR 80. The western part of the business loop from I-10 to SR 80 is signed as part of Historic US 80.

The route was originally designated along part of SR 86 while US 80 was conveyed over a portion of the present business route, west of present-day SR 80.

Major intersections
The entire route is in Cochise County.

Location	mi	km	Destinations	Notes
	303.77	488.87	I-10 / Historic US 80 begins – Tucson	Western terminus; western end of Historic US 80 concurrency; I-10 west exit 303; no access to I-10 BL from I-10 west; western terminus of Historic US 80
Benson	304.80	490.53	Ocotillo Avenue	Former BS 10 west; serves Benson Municipal Airport
Benson	305.79	492.12	SR 80 east (Historic US 80 east) – Tombstone, Bisbee, Douglas	Interchange; western terminus of SR 80; eastern end of Historic US 80 concurrency
Benson	306.92	493.94	I-10 – Tucson, El Paso	Eastern terminus; road continues north as Pomerene Road
1.000 mi = 1.609 km; 1.000 km = 0.621 mi: Concurrency terminus; Incomplete access

=== Benson business spur ===
Interstate 10 Business Spur
- State Route 10 Spur
- Location: Benson
- Length: 0.55 mi (890 m)
- Existed: 1969–1999

A map of the Benson business spur. The route is highlighted in red.

State Route 10 Spur (also known as SR 10 Spur) was a business spur of I-10 at Benson in Cochise County operated from 1969 to 1999. The 0.6-mile (1.0 km) route followed Ocotillo Road south from I-10 before ending at 4th Street (I-10 BL) west of downtown Benson.

Maintenance of the route was transferred to the city of Benson upon decommissioning.

Major intersections
The entire route was in Benson, Cochise County.

mi	km	Destinations	Notes
304.93	490.74	I-10 / North Ocotillo Avenue – Tucson, El Paso	Western terminus; I-10 Exit 304; road continues north as Ocotillo Avenue
305.48	491.62	BL 10 (4th Street) to SR 80 east / South Ocotillo Avenue	Eastern terminus; road continues south as Ocotillo Avenue
1.000 mi = 1.609 km; 1.000 km = 0.621 mi

=== Willcox business loop ===
Interstate 10 Business
- State Business Route 10 (4)
- Location: Willcox, Arizona
- Length: 8.33 mi (13.41 km)
- Existed: 1986–present

A map of the Willcox business loop. The route is highlighted in red.

State Business Route 10 (4) (also known as SR 10 Bus.) is a business loop of I-10 at Willcox in Cochise County operated since 1986. The 8.3-mile (13.4 km) route, following along Willcox's Haskell Avenue, begins at exit 336 of I-10 west of town and ends at exit 344 of I-10 east of town. Between its termini, the route has a brief concurrency with SR 186.

The route was formerly designated as part of US 666 and SR 86.

Major intersections
The entire route is in Cochise County.

Location	mi	km	Destinations	Notes
	336.39– 336.70	541.37– 541.87	I-10 / US 191 – El Paso, Safford, Tucson, Douglas	Western terminus; I-10 exit 336
Willcox	340.10	547.34	SR 186 south (Maley Street) – Dos Cabezas	Southern end of SR 186 concurrency
Willcox	340.81	548.48	SR 186 north (Rex Allen Drive)	Northern end of SR 186 concurrency
	344.66	554.68	I-10 / US 191 – Tucson, El Paso, Safford	Eastern terminus; I-10 exit 344
1.000 mi = 1.609 km; 1.000 km = 0.621 mi: Concurrency terminus

=== Bowie business loop ===
Interstate 10 Business
- State Business Route 10 (5)
- Location: Bowie, Arizona
- Length: 4.41 mi (7.10 km)
- Existed: 1980–present

A map of the Bowie business loop. The route is highlighted in red.

State Business Route 10 (5) (also known as SR 10 Bus.) is a business loop of I-10 at Bowie in Cochise County operated since 1980. The 4.4-mile (7.1 km) route along Sixth Street in Bowie begins at exit 362 of I-10 west of town and ends at exit 366 of I-10 east of town. Between its termini, the route has no major intersections.

The route was formerly designated as part of SR 86.

Major intersections
The entire route is in Cochise County.

Location	mi	km	Destinations	Notes
	362.41– 363.01	583.24– 584.21	I-10 – Tucson, El Paso	Western terminus; I-10 exit 362
	366.42– 366.91	589.70– 590.48	I-10 – El Paso, Tucson	Eastern terminus; I-10 exit 366
1.000 mi = 1.609 km; 1.000 km = 0.621 mi

=== San Simon business loop ===
Interstate 10 Business
- State Business Route 10 (6)
- Location: San Simon, Arizona
- Length: 3.90 mi (6.28 km)
- Existed: 1961–present

A map of the San Simon business loop. The route is highlighted in red.

State Business Route 10 (6) (also known as SR 10 Bus.) is a business loop of I-10 at San Simon in Cochise County operated since 1961. The 3.9-mile (6.3 km) route follows San Simon's Sixth Street beginning at exit 378 of I-10 west of town and ending at exit 382 of I-10 east of town. Between its termini, the route has no major intersections.

The route was formerly designated as part of SR 86.

Major intersections
The entire route is in Cochise County.

Location	mi	km	Destinations	Notes
San Simon	378.64– 379.15	609.36– 610.18	I-10 – Tucson, El Paso	Western terminus; I-10 exit 378
	382.13– 382.48	614.98– 615.54	I-10 – El Paso, Tucson	Eastern terminus; I-10 exit 382
1.000 mi = 1.609 km; 1.000 km = 0.621 mi

== New Mexico ==
All of the business loops within New Mexico are maintained by the New Mexico Department of Transportation (NMDOT). In New Mexico, Interstate business routes are named independently of their parent Interstate's designation with business loops of I-25 numbered between 10 and 19, those of I-10 between 20 and 29, and those of I-40 between 30 and 39. New Mexico business loop numbers ascend eastward and northward with gaps in numbering to allow for future designations. Within New Mexico, I-10 currently has business routes in Lordsburg and Deming.

=== Lordsburg business loop ===
Business Loop 10
- Location: Lordsburg, New Mexico
- Length: 4.370 mi (7.033 km)

Business Loop 10 is a business loop of Interstate 10 at Lordsburg in Hidalgo County. The 4.4-mile (7.1 km) route, which follows the city's Motel Drive, begins at exit 20 of I-10 west of town and ends at exit 24 of I-10 and US 70 east of town. Between its termini, the route has major intersections with US 70 and New Mexico State Road 494 (NM 494).

The route was originally designated as part of US 80 while a portion of the business route also conveyed US 70.

Major intersections
The entire route is in Lordsburg, Hidalgo County.

mi	km	Destinations	Notes
0.000	0.000	I-10 – Deming, Tucson	Western terminus; I-10 exit 20
2.067	3.327	US 70 west to NM 90 – Silver City, Duncan, Globe	Interchange; west end of overlap with US 70
2.135	3.436	East Bound Trucks (NM 494 south)	Northern terminus of NM 494
4.370	7.033	I-10 / US 70 – Deming, Lordsburg	Eastern terminus; east end of overlap with US 70; I-10 exit 24
1.000 mi = 1.609 km; 1.000 km = 0.621 mi: Concurrency terminus

=== Deming business loop ===
Business Loop 10
- Location: Deming, New Mexico
- Length: 4.458 mi (7.174 km)

Business Loop 10 is a business loop of I-10 at Deming in Luna County. The 4.5-mile (7.2 km) route begins at exit 81 of I-10 and US 70 west of town and follows Pine Street and Motel Drive to exit 85 of I-10, US 70, and US 180 east of town. Between its termini, the route has major intersections with US 180, NM 418, and NM 549.

The route was originally designated as part of US 70 and US 80 while a portion of the business route also conveyed US 180.

Major intersections
The entire route is in Deming, Luna County.

mi	km	Destinations	Notes
0.000	0.000	I-10 (US 70) – Lordsburg, Las Cruces	Western terminus; I-10 exit 81
0.610	0.982	NM 497 (Eighth Street) – City Park	Serves Mimbres Memorial Hospital
1.230	1.979	NM 11 south (Gold Avenue) – Columbus, Palomas Mex.	
3.735	6.011	NM 549 east	Former US 70/US 80 east
4.458	7.174	I-10 (US 70 / US 180) – Lordsburg, Las Cruces	Eastern terminus; I-10 exit 85
1.000 mi = 1.609 km; 1.000 km = 0.621 mi: Concurrency terminus

== Texas ==
All of the business loops within Texas are maintained by the Texas Department of Transportation (TxDOT). I-10 has four business loops in the state, each located in the far western Trans-Pecos region. Along I-10, TxDOT identifies each business route as Business Interstate 10 followed by an alphabetic suffix. Along Texas Interstates, the alphabetic suffixes on business route names ascend eastward and northward. There are gaps in the alphabetic values to allow for future system expansion. The alphabetic naming suffixes are included as small letters on the bottom of reassurance shields.

=== Sierra Blanca business loop ===
Business Interstate 10-C
- Location: Sierra Blanca, Texas
- Length: 2.747 mi (4.421 km)
- Existed: 1990–present

Business Interstate 10-C or Bus. I-10-C is a business loop of I-10 at Sierra Blanca in Hudspeth County commissioned in 1991. The 2.7-mile (4.3 km) route follows El Paso Street beginning at exit 105 on I-10 west of town and ending at exit 108 on I-10 east of town. The route has one major intersection with Ranch to Market Road 1111 (RM 1111) to Cornudas and Dell City.

The road was originally designated as part of US 80.

After October 15, 1965, the road was designated Texas State Highway Loop 416, although it was signed as a business route of US 80. This became the present Business I-10 designation on June 21, 1990.

Major intersections
The entire route is in Sierra Blanca, Hudspeth County.

mi	km	Destinations	Notes
0.0	0.0	I-10 – Fort Hancock, El Paso	Western terminus
1.5	2.4	RM 1111 (Archie Avenue) – Cornudas, Dell City	
2.7	4.3	I-10 – Allamoore, Van Horn	Eastern terminus
1.000 mi = 1.609 km; 1.000 km = 0.621 mi

=== Van Horn business loop ===
Business Interstate 10-D
- Location: Van Horn, Texas
- Length: 2.881 mi (4.637 km)
- Existed: 1990–present

Business Interstate 10-D or Bus. I-10-D is a business loop of I-10 at Van Horn in Culberson County commissioned in 1991. The 2.9-mile (4.7 km) route, which follows along Ross Drive and Broadway Boulevard in Van Horn, begins at exit 138 on I-10 west of town and ends at exit 140B on I-10 east of town. The road has major intersections with US 90 and Texas State Highway 54 (SH 54).

The road was originally designated as part of US 80. On November 25, 1975, the road was designated Texas State Highway Loop 519, although it was signed as a business route of US 80.

Major intersections
The entire route is in Van Horn, Culberson County.

mi	km	Destinations	Notes
0.0	0.0	I-10 – Sierra Blanca, El Paso	Western terminus
2.0	3.2	US 90 / SH 54 south (Van Horn Drive) – Valentine	Western end of SH 54 concurrency; western terminus of US 90
2.1	3.4	SH 54 north (La Caverna Street) – Pine Springs	Eastern end of SH 54 concurrency
2.9	4.7	I-10 – Kent, San Antonio	Eastern terminus
1.000 mi = 1.609 km; 1.000 km = 0.621 mi: Concurrency terminus

=== Balmorhea business loop ===
Business Interstate 10-F
- Location: Balmorhea, Texas
- Length: 2.000 mi (3.219 km)
- Existed: 1991–present

Business Interstate 10-F or Bus. I-10-F is a business loop of I-10 at Balmorhea in Reeves County commissioned in 1992. The route begins at exit 206 on I-10 and Farm to Market Road 2903 (FM 2903, Fort Worth Street) north of town and ends at exit 209 on I-10 and SH 17 (Main Street) east of the small community of Brogado. Although TxDOT certifies the length of the road as 2.0 miles (3.2 km), that length does not include a portion of the route concurrent with SH 17. This section brings the total length of the road to 4.6 miles (7.4 km). The junction where the road merges with SH 17 is the only major intersection between the road's termini.

The portion of Bus. I-10-F concurrent with SH 17 was formerly part of US 290 with the remainder formerly a southern extension of FM 2903.

Major intersections
The entire route is in Reeves County.

Location	mi	km	Destinations	Notes
	0.0	0.0	I-10 / FM 2903 – Kent, El Paso, Toyah	Western terminus
Balmorhea	1.9	3.1	SH 17 south (Main Street) – Toyahvale, Fort Davis	Western end of SH 17 concurrency
	4.6	7.4	I-10 / SH 17 – Fort Stockton, San Antonio, Saragosa, Pecos	Eastern end of SH 17 concurrency; eastern terminus
1.000 mi = 1.609 km; 1.000 km = 0.621 mi: Concurrency terminus

=== Fort Stockton business loop ===
Business Interstate 10-G
- Location: Fort Stockton, Texas
- Length: 1.398 mi (2.250 km)
- Existed: 1991–present

Business Interstate 10-G or Bus. I-10-G is a business loop of I-10 at Fort Stockton in Pecos County commissioned in 1992. The route, following the city's Dickinson Boulevard, begins at exit 256 on I-10 and US 67 west of town and ends at exit 261 on I-10, US 67, and US 385 east of town. Although TxDOT certifies the length of the road as 1.4 miles (2.3 km), that length does not include a portion of the route concurrent with other highways. These sections brings the total length of the road to 4.4 miles (7.1 km). Between its termini, the route has major intersections with US 285, US 385, SH 18, and FM 1053.

Bus. I-10-G was formerly designated as part of US 290.

Major intersections
The entire route is in Fort Stockton, Pecos County.

mi	km	Destinations	Notes
0.0	0.0	I-10 / US 67 – Balmorhea, El Paso, Alpine	Western terminus
1.5	2.4	US 285 north – Pecos	Western end of US 285 concurrency
2.2	3.5	SH 18 (North Front Street) – Monahans	
2.4	3.9	US 385 south (North Jackson Street) – Marathon	Western end of US 385 concurrency
2.5	4.0	FM 1053 (North Main Street) – Imperial	
2.9	4.7	US 285 south (North Alamo Street) – Sanderson	Eastern end of US 285 concurrency
4.4	7.1	I-10 / US 67 / US 385 north – Bakersfield, San Antonio, McCamey	Eastern end of US 385 concurrency; eastern terminus
1.000 mi = 1.609 km; 1.000 km = 0.621 mi: Concurrency terminus
