= Texas State Highway 329 =

State highway in Texas

State Highway 329
- SH 329, highlighted in red

Route information
- Maintained by TxDOT
- Length: 62.189 mi (100.083 km)
- Existed: 1940–present

Major junctions
- West end: SH 18 in Grandfalls
- US 385 in Crane
- East end: US 67 / SH 349 in Rankin

Location
- Country: United States
- State: Texas
- Counties: Ward, Crane, Upton

Highway system
- Highways in Texas; Interstate; US; State; Former; Toll; Loops; Spurs; FM/RM; Park; Rec
← SH 328	→ SH 330

State Highway 329 (SH 329) is a state highway that runs from Grandfalls in southwestern Texas east and southeast to Rankin.

== History ==
The route was originally designated on April 15, 1940 as the part of the highway from Grandfalls to Crane. An extension to Rankin was signed, but not designated on May 21, 1953 along Farm to Market Road 870 (FM 870). On August 29, 1990, the extension was officially designated, and FM 870 was cancelled.

FM 870 was designated on October 29, 1948 from US 67 in Rankin northwest 8.8 miles to a road intersection. On May 23, 1951, FM 870 was extended northwest 8.8 miles. On December 18, 1951, FM 870 was extended 14.3 miles to SH 51 (now US 385). In 1990, FM 870 was cancelled.

== Route description ==
Beginning at a junction with SH 18 at Grandfalls in Ward County, SH 329 runs east to a junction with US 385 at Crane in Crane County. In Grandfalls the highway is known as 1st Street; in Crane it is known as 6th Street. SH 329 then continues east and southeast to its final junction with US 67 at Rankin in Upton County. Most of the terrain covered by SH 329 is sparsely populated ranch and oil country.

== Junction list ==
County	Location	mi	km	Destinations	Notes
Ward	Grandfalls			SH 18	
Crane	Tubbs Corner			FM 1053	
Crane				FM 1601	
Crane	Crane			US 385 (Gaston Street)	
Upton				RM 1492	
Upton				RM 2463	
Upton	Rankin			US 67	
1.000 mi = 1.609 km; 1.000 km = 0.621 mi
