= Coyanosa Draw =

Location
- Country: United States
- State: Texas

Physical characteristics
- Mouth
  - location: 31.3716°N 103.1634°W

Coyanosa Draw is a river in Pecos County and Reeves County Texas, with part of it running adjacent to Coyanosa. It is 28 miles north west of Fort Stockton. The draw splits off from the Pecos River. While the draw was at one point visible running surface water, most of the draw is now groundwater. The river was named in Echo Burning, a Jack Reacher novel by Lee Child.

== See also ==
- List of rivers of Texas
