= Imperial Reservoir (Texas) =

- Location within Texas Location within the United States
- Location: Pecos County, Texas
- Coordinates: 31°15′41″N 102°50′49″W
- Type: reservoir
- Primary inflows: Pecos River
- Primary outflows: Imperial Canal
- Basin countries: United States
- Surface elevation: 2,431 ft (741 m)

Imperial Reservoir is a reservoir in Pecos County, Texas, south of the Pecos River and four miles (6.4 km) south of Grandfalls. It is bordered by Ranch to Market Road 2593 on the north and east; State Highway 18 is to the west.

The reservoir covers approximately 1,530 surface acres (620 ha) and has a capacity of 8,500 acre-feet (10,500,000 m^{3}). It is fed by Imperial Ditch (taking water from the Pecos River approximately 16 miles [26 km] to the northwest), and discharges into the Imperial Canal. It was constructed around 1912 to provide irrigation water to the canal and to promote land sales. Since 1955 it has been operated for recreational use by the Imperial Volunteer Fire Department.
