= Farm-to-market road =

Type of road in some U.S. states

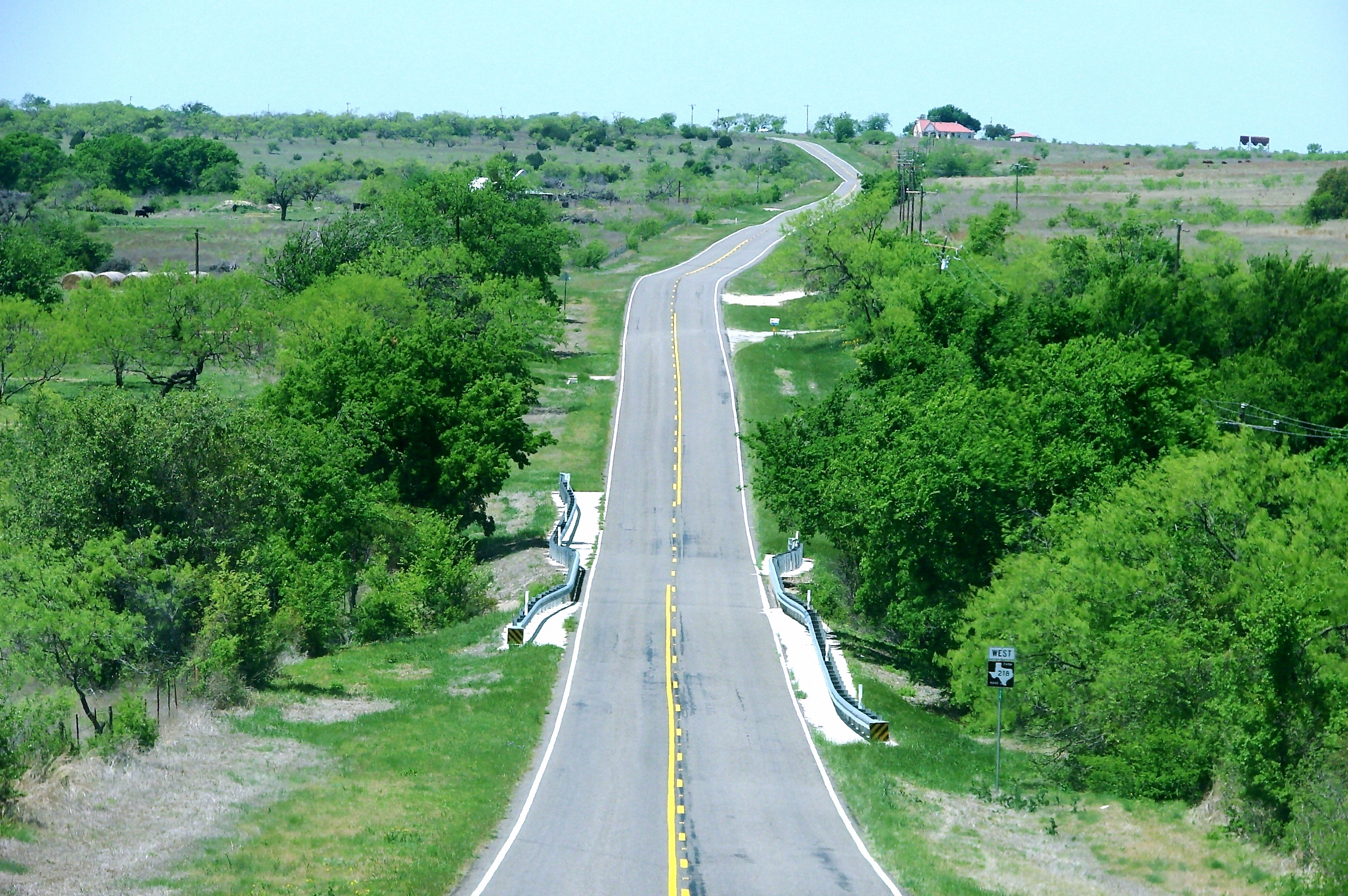
FM 218 outside Hamilton, Texas, a typical Texas farm-to-market road

In the United States, a farm-to-market road or ranch-to-market road (sometimes farm road or ranch road for short) is a state highway or county road that connects rural or agricultural areas to market towns. These are better-quality roads, usually a highway, that farmers and ranchers use to transport products to market towns or distribution centers. Historically used throughout the country, today the term is primarily associated with a large state-maintained highway system in Texas.

== History ==
By 1930, counties and townships across the U.S. had built a large number of farm-to-market roads, many of which were in need of repairs and safety improvements. The chief of the Bureau of Public Roads, Thomas Harris MacDonald, considered this need to be driven not by insufficient funding but by inefficient planning and inadequate equipment on the part of thousands of counties. He advocated for an expansion of state-maintained highway systems through the federal-aid highway program, so that counties could focus on maintaining fewer roads to a higher level of service.

== Texas ==
This term is most closely associated with Texas, where Farm to Market Road and Ranch to Market Road indicate roadways that are part of the state's system of secondary and connecting routes, built and maintained by the Texas Department of Transportation (TxDOT). Texas established this system in 1949 to improve access to rural areas. As with other state-maintained highways in Texas, all Farm or Ranch to Market roads are paved. The system consists primarily of two-lane roads, although some segments have an additional number of lanes, while some have been upgraded to freeways. Farm to Markets may also run alongside large urban freeways and tollways (for example, FM 1093, which runs west out of Houston to the Katy-Fulshear area alongside Westpark Tollway). Speed limits along these roads vary, but may be as high as 75 miles per hour (121 km/h) in rural areas, such as in Andrews and Pecos counties (for example, along FM 1788, FM 1776, and FM 1053).

=== History ===
The first farm-to-market road in Texas was completed in January 1937 during the Great Depression. It connected Mount Enterprise and the former community of Shiloh in Rusk County. The route was 5.8 miles (9.3 km) long and was constructed at a cost of $48,015.12 (equivalent to $822,000 in 2024). This route is now part of Texas State Highway 315.

The first officially designated highway, FM 1, was authorized in Sabine County, Texas in 1941 to connect US 96 near Pineland to a sawmill belonging to the Temple Lumber Company at Magasco. The first Ranch to Market Road was designated in 1942.

In 1945, the highway commission authorized a three-year pilot program for the construction of 7,205 miles (11,595 km) of farm-to-market roadways, with cost to be shared equally by the state and federal governments. As the program grew, efforts were made by legislators from rural areas, including State Senator Grady Hazlewood of Amarillo, to expand the farm-to-market road network in the late 1940s. The funding was to have come from an increase in the fuel tax, as proposed by State Senator Grover Morris in 1947. Although polls suggested that a majority of Texas residents were in favor of such a tax, this measure was stymied by lobbyists, who supported such funding for arterial roads.

The popularity of the program and the perceived need to connect the vast, isolated central and western areas of the state prompted the passing of the Colson-Briscoe Act in 1949, sponsored by State Senator E. Neveille Colson and State Representative Dolph Briscoe. This legislation appropriated funding for the creation of an extensive system of secondary roads to provide access to the rural areas of the state and to allow farmers and ranchers to bring their goods to market, reserving a flat $15 million per year (equivalent to $156 million in 2024) plus 1 cent (equivalent to $0.14 in 2025) per gallon of gasoline sold in the state for local highway construction.

By 1957, the system had grown to over 31,000 miles (50,000 km). In 1962, the Texas legislature adjusted the appropriated funding amount to $23 million annually (equivalent to $182 million in 2024), through federal fund matching, and expanded the farm-to-market system from 35,000 to 50,000 miles (56,000 to 80,000 km). By 1964, the system's mileage exceeded that of all other federal and state routes combined. The system now accounts for over half of the mileage maintained by TxDOT.

=== Identification ===
The sign for FM 1960, a farm-to-market road near Houston, Texas

Signs designating a Farm to Market or Ranch to Market road are a black square background containing a white shape of the state of Texas, with the words "FARM ROAD" or "RANCH ROAD" appearing in white text on the background and the route number in black text within the shape of Texas. Guide signs (the large green signs usually found along highways in the United States) designating these roads use a simple white rectangle with the abbreviation "F.M." or "R.M." and the route number appearing below the abbreviation in black text.

As a result of population growth and the expansion of urban areas, many Farm to Market and Ranch to Market roads that originally served rural areas now serve urban areas, sometimes exclusively. An effort was made to rename such roads "Urban Roads" on June 27, 1995, but residents opposed the effort, arguing that removing the "Farm" and "Ranch" from the designations was "un-Texan," and that the cost of changing signage was not justified. Other than a few route markers, such as on FM 1315 near Victoria, most signs were not changed, and TxDOT abandoned the idea to do so. While the Farm to Market and Ranch to Market route markers remained in use, the state tracked these Urban Roads separately in its highway designation files. For example, the mileage of FM 544 in the Plano area was transferred from FM 544 to UR 544 in 1995. As part of the state highway system, Urban Roads were eligible for state maintenance; however, unlike rural Farm to Market and Ranch to Market roads, they did not receive state funding for expansion. On November 15, 2018, the Urban Road system was cancelled, and all roads on this system reverted back to their previous FM and RM designations. For example, UR 544 was redesignated as FM 544.

Distribution of Farm to Market (green) and Ranch to Market (brown) Roads

Farm to Market and Ranch to Market roads are numbered as a single set of roads; thus, there is not an FM and an RM route with the same number. Urban Roads were designated with the same route numbers as the FM or RM routes from which the mileage was transferred.

Ranch Road 1, which runs near the former ranch home of former President Lyndon B. Johnson, is signed with a Ranch to Market Road route marker, but it is not part of this system; rather, it is the only roadway that TxDOT has designated as a "Ranch Road".

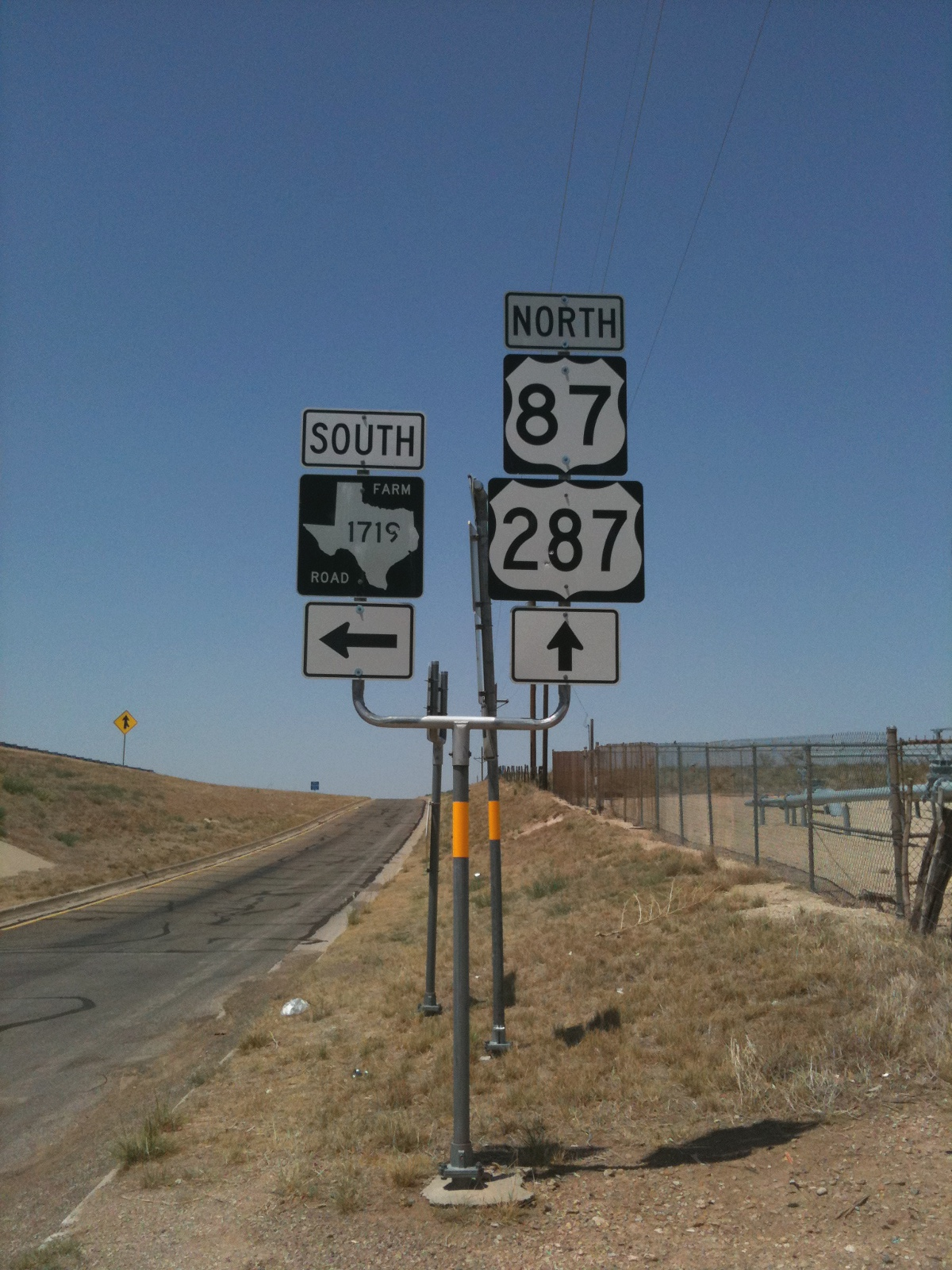
Route marker: FM 1719 route marker in Potter County (left) alongside route markers for U.S. 87 and U.S. 287 (right)

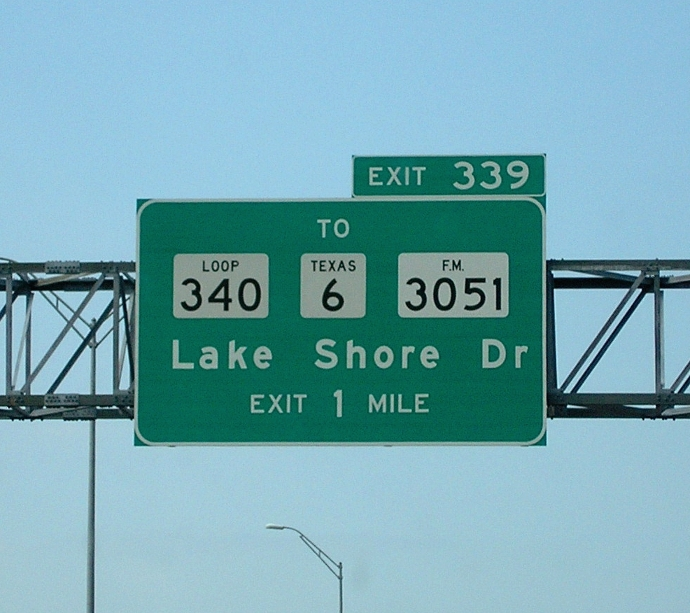
Guide sign: destination sign along Interstate 35 showing typical signage for a Farm to Market Road (right), along with signage for a State Highway Loop (left) and a State Highway (center) for comparison

=== Business routes ===
Route marker for Business Farm to Market Road 1960

Texas currently has two signed business routes of Farm to Market Roads: Business RM 1431 in Burnet County and Business FM 1960 in Harris County. Both business routes are former alignments that have been bypassed by newer routings. A third business route, Business FM 1187 in Tarrant County, was designated from 2004 to 2016.

== Other states ==
Missouri has a similar state-operated system of farm-to-market roads, called Missouri supplemental routes. Missouri uses single (e.g., "O", "V") and double letters (e.g., "NN", "AC").

Iowa also has a farm-to-market road system. Those roads are under county jurisdiction, but are eligible for state aid from a dedicated fund.

Louisiana has a farm-to-market road system. The 1955 renumbering renumbered all routes based on an A-B-C system of route classification: A is primary, B secondary, and C farm-to-market. All routes 300 through 1266 are classified C routes.

Ohio's farm-to-market roads were maintained by the state Department of Highways but built to only a county road standard. In 1939, the state spent $1.47 million (equivalent to $26 million in 2024) to improve 74,417 centerline miles (119,763 km) of farm-to-market roads. In 1940, the department launched a farm-to-market road improvement program alongside the usual maintenance program; it improved 742 miles (1,194 km) of roadway at a cost of $9.59 million, including funds from the Works Progress Administration.

== See also ==
- List of Farm to Market Roads in Texas
- Agricultural road
- Agriculture in Texas
