= Coyanosa, Texas =

- CDP
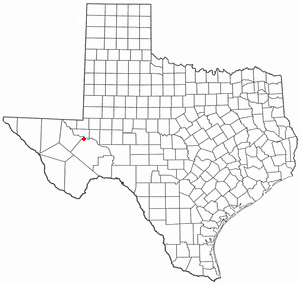
- Location of Coyanosa, Texas

- Coordinates: 31°14′26″N 103°3′58″W
- Country: United States
- State: Texas
- County: Pecos

Area
  - Total: 0.19 sq mi (0.5 km^{2})
  - Land: 0.19 sq mi (0.5 km^{2})
  - Water: 0 sq mi (0.0 km^{2})
- Elevation: 2,608 ft (795 m)

Population (2020)
  - Total: 155
  - Density: 800/sq mi (310/km^{2})
- Time zone: UTC-6 (Central (CST))
  - Summer (DST): UTC-5 (CDT)
- ZIP code: 79730
- Area code: 432
- FIPS code: 48-17408
- GNIS feature ID: 1355271

Coyanosa is a census-designated place (CDP) in Pecos County, Texas, located in the Permian Basin in West Texas, United States. Its population was 155 at the 2020 census. Part of the Coyanosa Draw runs adjacent to the town, 2.2 miles to the west.

== History ==
Coyanosa was originally settled as a ranching community in the early 1900s. A post office was established in 1908, but was discontinued 10 years later. Further development of the community resumed in the 1950s, as numerous water wells were drilled in the area to irrigate nearby cotton farms. By 1958, around 200 people lived in Coyanosa. The post office reopened, and by the early 1960s, the population had risen to 600. Increasing fuel prices in the mid-1970s made irrigation unprofitable and forced many area cotton farms out of business. A decline in the number of inhabitants soon followed. By 1990, Coyanosa had around 270 people. That figure had fallen to 138 by 2000.

== Geography ==
Coyanosa is located at 31°14′26″N 103°03′58″W (31.240532, -103.066121). It is situated south of the intersection of Farm Roads 1776 and 1450, approximately 26 miles northwest of Fort Stockton in northwestern Pecos County.

According to the United States Census Bureau in 2000, the CDP has a total area of 0.1 square miles (0.26 km^{2}), all of it land. By the 2010 census, the CDP had increased in size to 0.2 square miles (0.52 km^{2}), all land.

== Climate ==
According to bestplaces.net, Coyanosa has on average 261 sunny days out of the year, averages 2 inches of snow a year, and 14 inches of rain on average per year. July is the hottest month for Coyanosa with an average high temperature of 97.7°, which ranks it as warmer than most places in Texas. January has the coldest nighttime temperatures for Coyanosa with an average of 28.3°. This is one of the coldest places in Texas.

== Demographics ==
Historical population
Census	Pop.	Note	%±
2000	138		—
2010	163		18.1%
2020	155		−4.9%
U.S. Decennial Census; 1850–1900 1910; 1920 1930 1940; 1950 1960 1970; 1980 1990 2000; 2010

Coyanosa first appeared as a census designated place in the 2000 U.S. census.

=== 2020 census ===
Coyanosa CDP, Texas – Racial and ethnic composition Note: the US Census treats Hispanic/Latino as an ethnic category. This table excludes Latinos from the racial categories and assigns them to a separate category. Hispanics/Latinos may be of any race.
Race / Ethnicity (NH = Non-Hispanic)	Pop 2000	Pop 2010	Pop 2020	% 2000	% 2010	% 2020
White alone (NH)	20	4	4	14.49%	2.45%	2.58%
Black or African American alone (NH)	0	0	0	0.00%	0.00%	0.00%
Native American or Alaska Native alone (NH)	0	0	1	0.00%	0.00%	0.65%
Asian alone (NH)	0	0	0	0.00%	0.00%	0.00%
Native Hawaiian or Pacific Islander alone (NH)	0	0	0	0.00%	0.00%	0.00%
Other race alone (NH)	0	0	0	0.00%	0.00%	0.00%
Mixed race or Multiracial (NH)	0	0	1	0.00%	0.00%	0.65%
Hispanic or Latino (any race)	118	159	149	85.51%	97.55%	96.13%
Total	138	163	155	100.00%	100.00%	100.00%

As of the census of 2000, 138 people, 46 households, and 39 families were residing in the CDP. The population density was 1,153.3 inhabitants per square mile (445.3/km^{2}). The 59 housing units averaged 493.1/sq mi (189.8/km^{2}). The racial makeup of the CDP was 100.00% White. Hispanics or Latinos of any race were 85.51% of the population.

Of the 46 households, 45.7% had children under the age of 18 living with them, 67.4% were married couples living together, 15.2% had a female householder with no husband present, and 15.2% were not families. About 10.9% of all households were made up of individuals, and none had someone living alone who was 65 or older. The average household size was 3.00, and the average family size was 3.18.

In the CDP, the age distribution was 31.9% under the age of 18, 10.9% from 18 to 24, 19.6% from 25 to 44, 28.3% from 45 to 64, and 9.4% who were 65 or older. The median age was 34 years. For every 100 females, there were 100.0 males. For every 100 females age 18 and over, there were 95.8 males.

The median income for a household in the CDP was $9,643, and for a family was $17,083. Males had a median income of $38,393 versus $48,750 for females. The per capita income for the CDP was $7,974. There were 36.4% of families and 41.9% of the population living below the poverty line, including 37.0% of under eighteens and 36.4% of those over 64.

== Government and infrastructure ==
The United States Postal Service operates the Coyanosa Post Office. Coyanosa is under the jurisdiction of the municipality of Fort Stockton, the county seat of Pecos County.

== Education ==
Coyanosa is served by the Fort Stockton Independent School District.

== Petroleum ==
Coyanosa is also on the site of an oil field, having wells going down as much as 2 miles.
