= Wickett, Texas =

Town in Ward County, Texas, United States

- Town
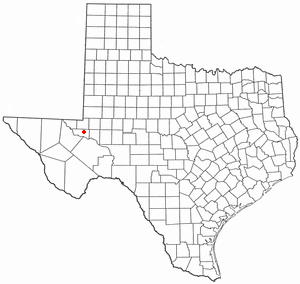
- Location of Wickett, Texas

- Coordinates: 31°34′9″N 103°0′25″W
- Country: United States
- State: Texas
- County: Ward

Area
  - Total: 0.70 sq mi (1.82 km^{2})
  - Land: 0.70 sq mi (1.82 km^{2})
  - Water: 0 sq mi (0.00 km^{2})
- Elevation: 2,667 ft (813 m)

Population (2020)
  - Total: 422
  - Density: 600.5/sq mi (231.86/km^{2})
- Time zone: UTC-6 (Central (CST))
  - Summer (DST): UTC-5 (CDT)
- ZIP code: 79788
- Area code: 432
- FIPS code: 48-79036
- GNIS feature ID: 1371487

Wickett is a town in Ward County, Texas, United States. The population was 422 at the 2020 census.

== History ==
If it had not been for George W. O'Brien, the place which was to become Wickett might have remained as Aroya, merely a switch and a section house on the Texas and Pacific Railroad, established to house one of the maintenance crews for the railroad. O'Brien gave Southern Crude's camp (for employees), for offices, tank farm and loading racks. O'Brien furnished the land for the townsite which was to become Wickett (named for Fred H. Wickett, a chairman of the Pan American Petroleum and Transport Co., of which Southern Crude was a subsidiary).

Wickett's official "birthday" was February 14, 1927; and the rush for residence and business lots in the new town was like the early days of Nevada and California. After celebrating its four-weeks anniversary on March 4, 1927, Wickett's "fathers" were planning to make it the county seat of Ward County.

The new town's early arrivals lived in crude frame shacks, in tents and under wagons. A two-story, forty-two room hotel was constructed. The Bluebonnet Refinery was built in Wickett by a group of men under the leadership of B.L. Woolley of Dallas and H.B. Hassett of St. Louis, Missouri, to process crude oil, gasoline, kerosene, diesel and other fuel oil.

Onnie Mae O'Brien became the first Postmistress on June 14, 1927, after a petition was circulated for the designation of Wickett for a U.S. Post Office.

Wickett Independent School District was created on August 20, 1928, by taking 14 sections from the Monahans District and 21 sections from the Pyote District. The Wickett School District was one of the richest of its size in the state. A two-room brick building was constructed and circa 1932, a two-room cafeteria was built. The 14 sections were returned to Monahans District in 1931.

In 1928, Bluebonnet Refinery was sold and the name was changed to Wickett Refinery Co. Gulf Oil Corporation acquired the properties of Southern Crude. The Wickett Refinery was closed in May 1973.

In 1936, a consolidation of the Wickett and Monahans schools was agreed upon because of declining enrollment. It was understood that an elementary school would remain in Wickett. On April 1, 1937, it was announced that the district was now the Monahans-Wickett Independent School District. Until 1953, the school was known as Wickett Ward School, but after the death of Mrs. Helen Gensler (a teacher), the Trustees on January 13, 1953, voted to change the name of the Helen Gensler Elementary School.

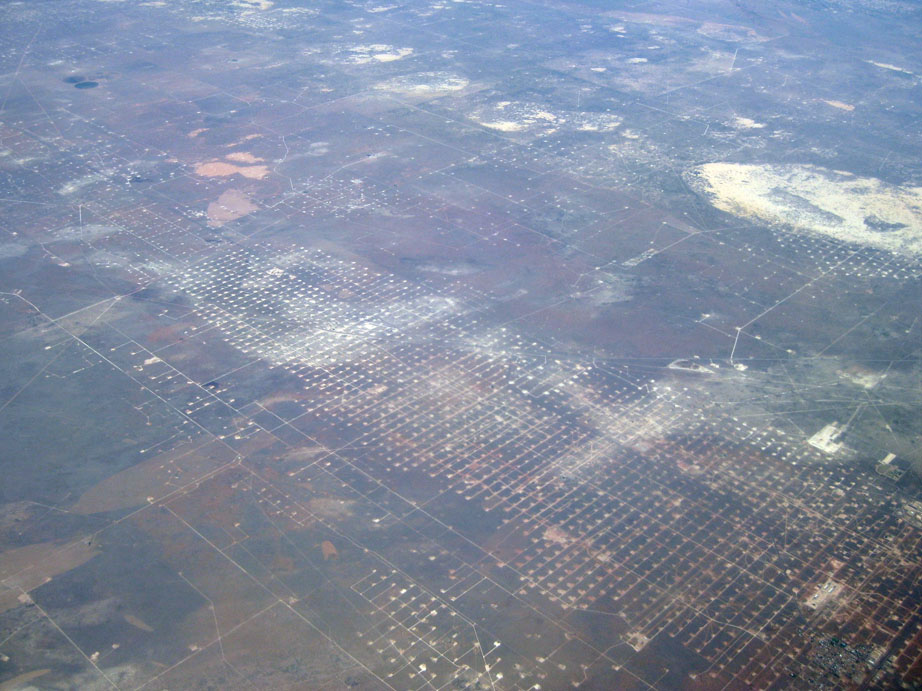
Oblique air photo of Wickett, facing northeast, showing a multitude of natural gas wells, in 2011

In 1937, the Cabot Companies of Boston Mass., brought a sizeable new industry to Wickett. A plant was established to extract "natural gasoline" and other liquid hydrocarbons which could be extracted from natural gas. In addition, a factory for the production of carbon black was constructed to claim the residue available from the burning of the "dry" gas. At the height of its operations, Cabot was second only to Gulf Oil as the largest private employer in Ward County.

Although Wickett, like many West Texas communities, lost population in the 1950s and 1960s, the community was incorporated in March 1962 so that water and sewer services would be available to its residents. The first mayor was Harold Massey, son-in-law of G.W. O'Brien. Other officials were: C.W. Ross Sr., City Marshall, and councilmen were: W.O. Luckie, D.P. Fambrough, Alvie Pardue, V.C. Moore and F.E."Shorty" Parker. There were 100 votes for the incorporation of Wickett and 53 votes against the incorporation.

== Geography ==
Wickett is located at 31°34′9″N 103°0′25″W (31.569032, –103.006896).

According to the United States Census Bureau, the town has a total area of 0.7 square mile (1.8 km^{2}), all land.

== Demographics ==
Historical population
Census	Pop.	Note	%±
1970	598		—
1980	689		15.2%
1990	560		−18.7%
2000	455		−18.7%
2010	498		9.5%
2020	422		−15.3%

As of the census of 2000, there were 455 people, 173 households, and 129 families residing in the town. The population density was 648.0 inhabitants per square mile (250.2/km^{2}). There were 213 housing units at an average density of 303.3 per square mile (117.1/km^{2}). The racial makeup of the town was 85.71% White, 4.40% African American, 0.44% Native American, 7.91% from other races, and 1.54% from two or more races. Hispanic or Latino of any race were 25.49% of the population.

There were 173 households, out of which 32.9% had children under the age of 18 living with them, 57.2% were married couples living together, 11.0% had a female householder with no husband present, and 25.4% were non-families. 19.7% of all households were made up of individuals, and 9.8% had someone living alone who was 65 years of age or older. The average household size was 2.63 and the average family size was 3.00.

In the town, the population was spread out, with 28.6% under the age of 18, 5.7% from 18 to 24, 25.5% from 25 to 44, 26.2% from 45 to 64, and 14.1% who were 65 years of age or older. The median age was 38 years. For every 100 females, there were 91.2 males. For every 100 females age 18 and over, there were 93.5 males.

The median income for a household in the town was $27,407, and the median income for a family was $30,500. Males had a median income of $25,875 versus $20,156 for females. The per capita income for the town was $14,999. About 16.1% of families and 18.0% of the population were below the poverty line, including 28.0% of those under age 18 and 4.2% of those age 65 or over.

== Education ==
The Town of Wickett is served by the Monahans-Wickett-Pyote Independent School District.

All of Ward County is zoned to Odessa College.

== See also ==
- List of municipalities in Texas
