= Monahans, Texas =

City in and county seat of Ward County, Texas, United States

- City
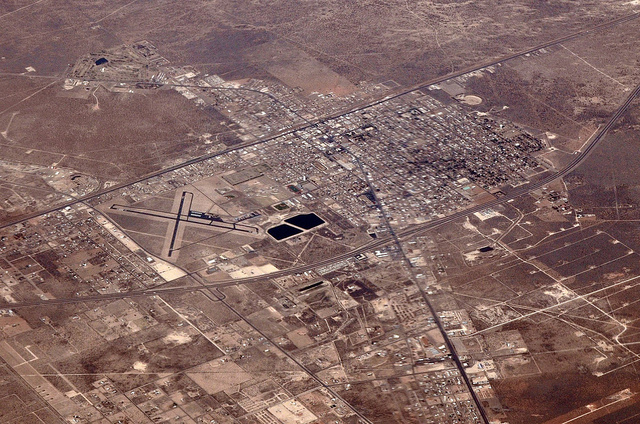
- Air photo of part of Monahans facing northeast. February 2012

- Location of Monahans, Texas
- Coordinates: 31°35′16″N 102°53′26″W
- Country: United States
- State: Texas
- Counties: Ward, Winkler

Government
  - Mayor: Adam Steen

Area
  - Total: 28.93 sq mi (74.93 km^{2})
  - Land: 28.92 sq mi (74.90 km^{2})
  - Water: 0.012 sq mi (0.03 km^{2})
- Elevation: 2,621 ft (799 m)

Population (2020)
  - Total: 7,836
  - Density: 271.0/sq mi (104.6/km^{2})
- Time zone: UTC−6 (Central (CST))
  - Summer (DST): UTC−5 (CDT)
- ZIP code: 79756
- Area code: 432
- FIPS code: 48-48936
- GNIS feature ID: 1363045
- Website: www.cityofmonahans.org

Monahans is a city in Ward and Winkler counties in Texas, United States, that is the county seat of Ward County. A very small portion of the city extends into Winkler County. The population was 6,953 at the 2010 census. In 2020, the population was estimated at 7,836.

== History ==
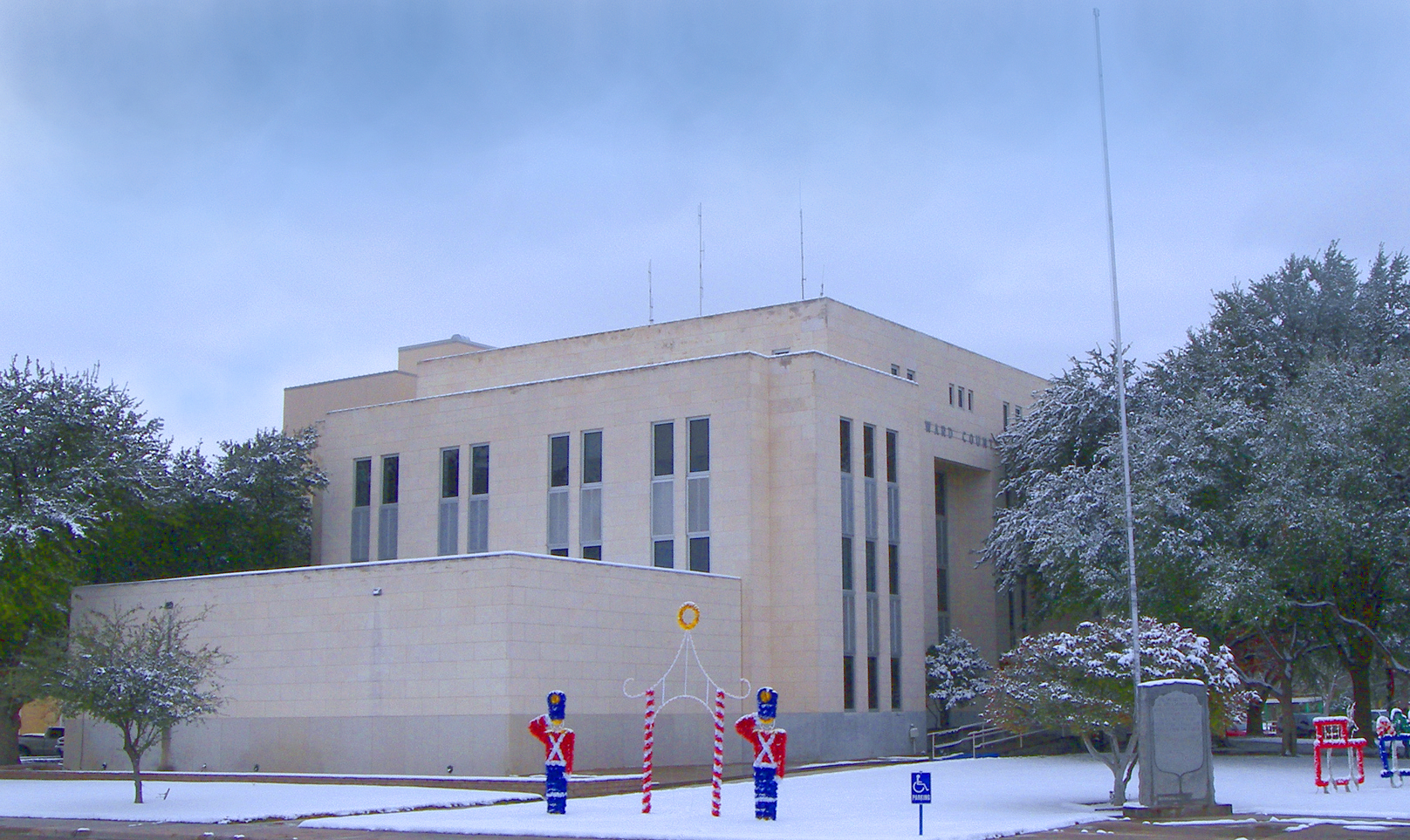
Ward County Courthouse in Monahans, December 2009

The Permian Basin, home to Monahans and Midland-Odessa combined statistical area, is 250 miles (400 km) wide and 300 miles (480 km) long; Monahans is "The Center of the Permian Basin". The basin was formed during the Permian period, the final portion of the Paleozoic era. At the time, it was an ocean filled with abundant aquatic life.

In 1583, Spanish explorer Antonio de Espejo crossed this area on his way through present-day New Mexico. The Indians in the Monahans region were called vaqueros by these Spanish explorers because they hunted the "hump-backed cattle" or bison. Records of Spanish exploring the Los Medanos (the sand dunes) outside Monahans can be traced to the early 1770s.

Located in a region where native Comanches, Mescalero, and Lipan Apache Indians once roamed, Monahans' history as a community extends back to the late 1880s with the expansion of the Texas and Pacific Railway across the South Plains. For the few people living in West Texas, the building of a transcontinental railroad through the area meant the arrival of civilization. In the summer of 1881, Texas and Pacific Railroad contracted with surveyor John Thomas Monahan, who discovered that the lack of water for the laying crew and their animals would slow down construction of the rail. Monahan's digging of a water well produced an abundance of good water (250,000 US gal (950,000 L) a day) and was instrumental in the success of the city. Prior to this solution, water had to be hauled to the area from Big Spring, Texas.

The availability of cheap land encouraged settlers to form a small community on the track known as Monahans Well. When oil was discovered in the area in 1926, though, the community changed directions. Oil discovery brought people of many occupations and of varied interests to Monahans. The local economy began to change from an agricultural to an industrial economy.

In June 1994, a temperature of 120 °F was recorded in Monahans, a still-standing record-holder for highest-ever Texan temperature.

=== Monahans Sandhills State Park ===
Thousands of tourists each year visit Monahans Sandhills State Park near Monahans. Sand surfing and sand football games can be seen year round, but particularly between March and November. Monahans Sandhills State Park is host to many family picnics and youth activities.

== Geography ==
=== Climate ===
Climate data for Monahans, Texas (1981–2010)
Month	Jan	Feb	Mar	Apr	May	Jun	Jul	Aug	Sep	Oct	Nov	Dec	Year
Record high °F (°C)	87 (31)	91 (33)	100 (38)	106 (41)	114 (46)	120 (49)	115 (46)	110 (43)	108 (42)	104 (40)	92 (33)	86 (30)	120 (49)
Mean daily maximum °F (°C)	61.8 (16.6)	66.5 (19.2)	74.4 (23.6)	83.4 (28.6)	91.5 (33.1)	97.5 (36.4)	98.6 (37.0)	97.0 (36.1)	91.1 (32.8)	82.5 (28.1)	70.7 (21.5)	61.8 (16.6)	81.4 (27.4)
Mean daily minimum °F (°C)	28.6 (−1.9)	33.0 (0.6)	39.5 (4.2)	48.2 (9.0)	58.0 (14.4)	67.0 (19.4)	69.2 (20.7)	68.5 (20.3)	61.7 (16.5)	50.5 (10.3)	37.7 (3.2)	29.1 (−1.6)	49.3 (9.6)
Record low °F (°C)	−9 (−23)	−8 (−22)	12 (−11)	25 (−4)	35 (2)	45 (7)	50 (10)	50 (10)	33 (1)	22 (−6)	10 (−12)	5 (−15)	−9 (−23)
Average precipitation inches (mm)	0.54 (14)	0.71 (18)	0.53 (13)	0.57 (14)	1.60 (41)	1.35 (34)	1.61 (41)	1.73 (44)	2.03 (52)	1.63 (41)	0.58 (15)	0.67 (17)	13.54 (344)
Average snowfall inches (cm)	0.2 (0.51)	0.0 (0.0)	0.1 (0.25)	0.0 (0.0)	0.0 (0.0)	0.0 (0.0)	0.0 (0.0)	0.0 (0.0)	0.0 (0.0)	0.0 (0.0)	0.1 (0.25)	0.3 (0.76)	0.8 (2.0)
Source: NOAA

== Demographics ==
Historical population
Census	Pop.	Note	%±
1930	816		—
1940	3,944		383.3%
1950	6,311		60.0%
1960	8,567		35.7%
1970	8,333		−2.7%
1980	8,397		0.8%
1990	8,101		−3.5%
2000	6,821		−15.8%
2010	6,953		1.9%
2020	7,836		12.7%
1930-2000, 2010

=== 2020 census ===
As of the 2020 census, Monahans had a population of 7,836, 2,810 households, and 1,799 families residing in the city. The median age was 35.0 years; 27.4% of residents were under the age of 18 and 13.4% were 65 years of age or older. For every 100 females there were 101.8 males, and for every 100 females age 18 and over there were 100.6 males age 18 and over.

97.0% of residents lived in urban areas, while 3.0% lived in rural areas.

There were 2,810 households in Monahans, of which 38.3% had children under the age of 18 living in them. Of all households, 50.2% were married-couple households, 19.5% were households with a male householder and no spouse or partner present, and 26.0% were households with a female householder and no spouse or partner present. About 24.8% of all households were made up of individuals and 9.7% had someone living alone who was 65 years of age or older.

There were 3,470 housing units, of which 19.0% were vacant. The homeowner vacancy rate was 2.9% and the rental vacancy rate was 25.1%.

Racial composition as of the 2020 census
Race	Number	Percent
White	4,170	53.2%
Black or African American	422	5.4%
American Indian and Alaska Native	92	1.2%
Asian	54	0.7%
Native Hawaiian and Other Pacific Islander	2	0.0%
Some other race	1,435	18.3%
Two or more races	1,661	21.2%
Hispanic or Latino (of any race)	4,412	56.3%

=== 2000 census ===
As of the census of 2000, 6,821 people, 2,496 households, and 1,837 families were residing in the city. The population density was 274.9 inhabitants per square mile (106.1/km^{2}). The 3,015 housing units averaged 121.5 units per square mile (46.9 units/km^{2}). The racial makeup of the city was 79.30% White, 5.16% African American, 0.35% Native American, 0.35% Asian, 12.55% from other races, and 2.29% from two or more races. Hispanics or Latinos of any race were 43.66% of the population.

Of the 2,496 households, 38.3% had children under the age of 18 living with them, 56.4% were married couples living together, 13.5% had a female householder with no husband present, and 26.4% were not families. About 24.3% of all households were made up of individuals, and 12.7% had someone living alone who was 65 years of age or older. The average household size was 2.68, and the average family size was 3.19.

In the city, the age distribution was 30.3% under 18, 8.2% from 18 to 24, 25.7% from 25 to 44, 21.5% from 45 to 64, and 14.3% who were 65 years of age or older. The median age was 36 years. For every 100 females, there were 93.1 males. For every 100 females age 18 and over, there were 89.4 males.

The median income for a household in the city was $30,349, and for a family was $36,726. Males had a median income of $31,307 versus $18,086 for females. The per capita income for the city was $14,100. About 14.7% of families and 16.5% of the population were below the poverty line, including 17.1% of those under age 18 and 18.1% of those age 65 or over.

In December 2015, the Seattle Post-Intelligencer voted Monahans fifth among the 10 "most conservative" cities in the United States in regard to campaign contributions. Other West Texas communities in the most conservative lineup are Hereford (first), Dalhart (fifth, tie), and Childress (9th). Princeton in Collin County north of Dallas ranked second.

== Government and infrastructure ==
The Texas Department of Criminal Justice operates the Monahans District Parole Office in Monahans.

The United States Postal Service operates the Monahans Post Office.

== Education ==
Public education in the city of Monahans is provided by the Monahans-Wickett-Pyote Independent School District.

All of Ward County and all of Winkler County are zoned to Odessa College.

== Transportation ==
The Texas-New Mexico Railroad operates a 111-mile (179 km) branch line from a connection with the Union Pacific at Monahans. The branch line was constructed between 1928 and 1930 and terminates at Lovington, New Mexico.

== Major highways ==
- I-20
- SH 18

== Notable people ==
- Guy Clark, a songwriter and country musician, mentioned the city in his songs and in the 1997 live album Keepers during a musical interlude
- Dale Dudley, Texas Radio Hall of Fame member, host of Dudley and Bob Morning Show on KLBJ-FM in Austin, spent part of his childhood in Monahans
- Deanna Dunagan, Tony Award-winning actress
- Edward Llewellyn, trumpet player
- Kathy Whitworth, a professional golfer in Texas Sports Hall of Fame and World Golf Hall of Fame, was born here
- Natalie Zea, an actress in the television series Justified, went to high school in Monahans

== See also ==
- List of municipalities in Texas
