= Pecos, Texas =

- City
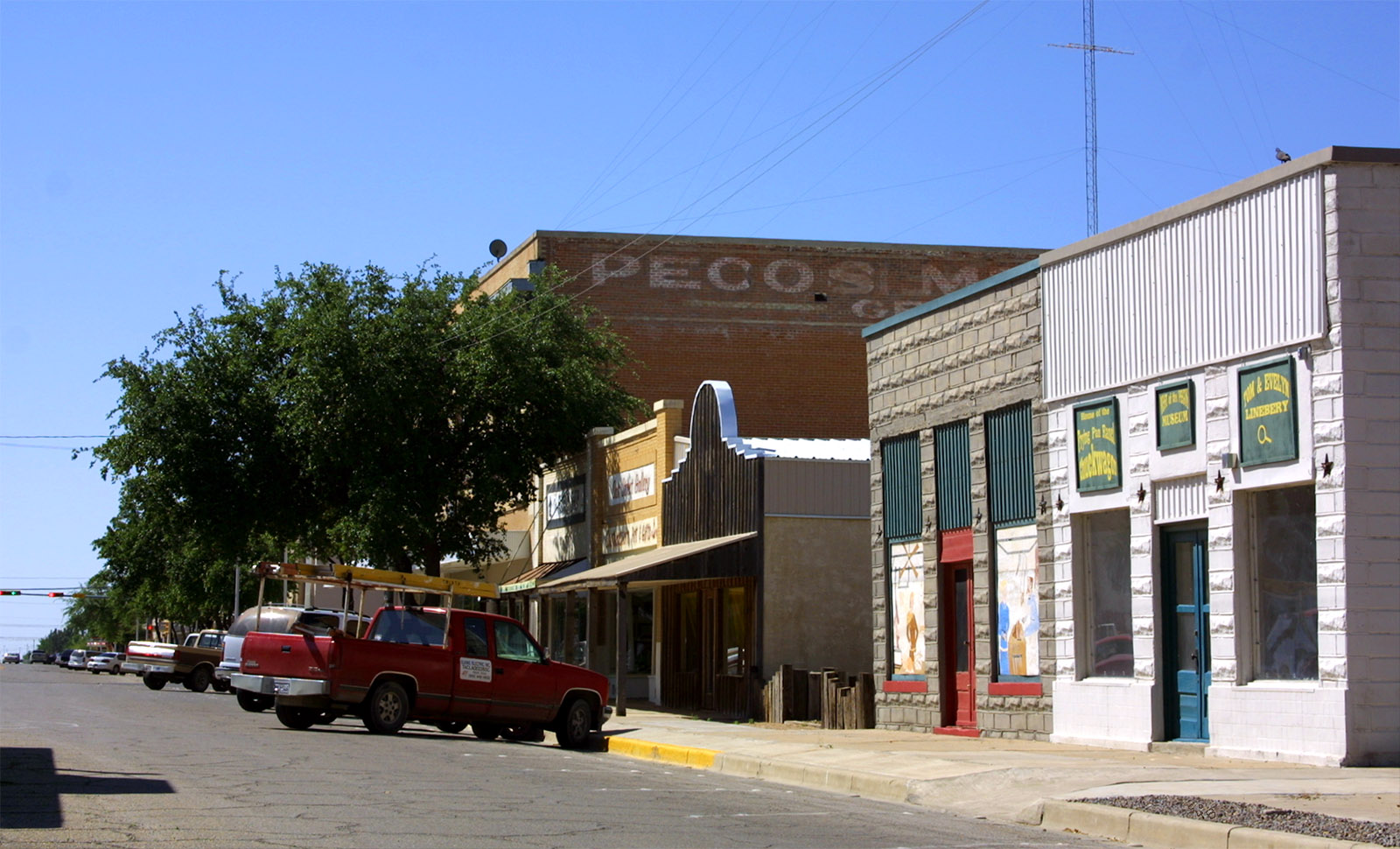
- Storefronts in downtown Pecos
- Nickname: Tarilas
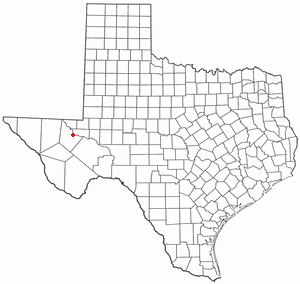
- Location of Pecos, Texas

- Coordinates: 31°24′56″N 103°30′0″W
- Country: United States
- State: Texas
- County: Reeves

Government
  - Mayor: Teresa Winkles

Area
  - Total: 22.22 sq mi (57.56 km^{2})
  - Land: 22.22 sq mi (57.56 km^{2})
  - Water: 0 sq mi (0.00 km^{2})
- Elevation: 2,582 ft (787 m)

Population (2020)
  - Total: 12,916
  - Density: 580/sq mi (224/km^{2})
- Time zone: UTC-6 (Central (CST))
  - Summer (DST): UTC-5 (CDT)
- ZIP code: 79772
- Area code: 432
- FIPS code: 48-56516
- GNIS feature ID: 1364996
- Website: http://www.pecostx.gov/

Pecos (/ˈpeɪkəs/ PAY-kəs) is the largest city in and the county seat of Reeves County, Texas, United States. It is in the valley on the west bank of the Pecos River at the eastern edge of the Chihuahuan Desert, in the Trans-Pecos region of West Texas and just south of New Mexico's border. Its population was 12,916 at the 2020 census. On January 24, 2012, Pecos City appeared on the Forbes 400 as the second-fastest growing small town in the United States. The city is a regional commercial center for ranching, oil and gas production, and agriculture. The city is most recognized for its association with the local cultivation of cantaloupes. Pecos claims to be the site of the world's first rodeo on July 4, 1883.

== History ==
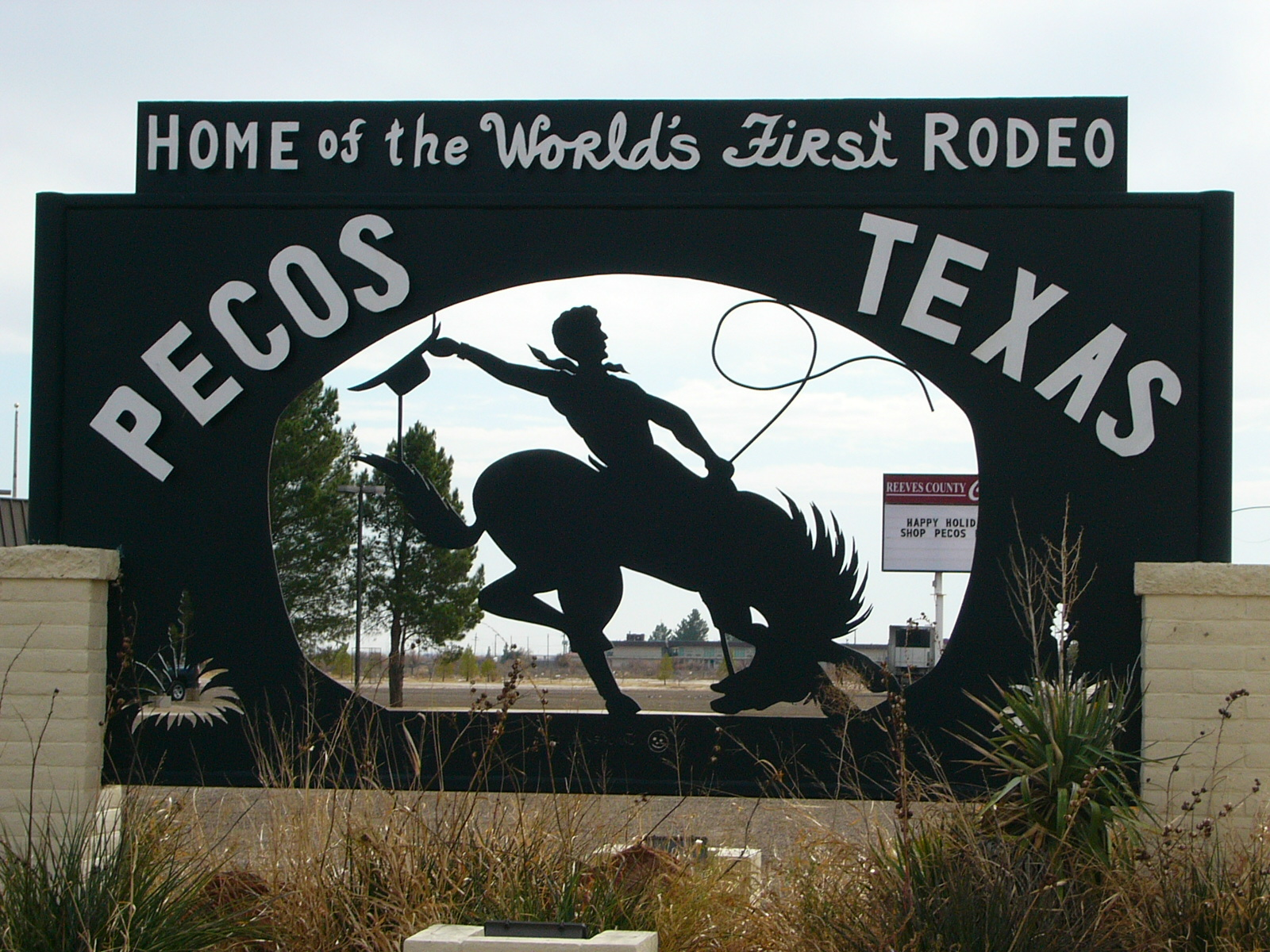
Signpost in Pecos

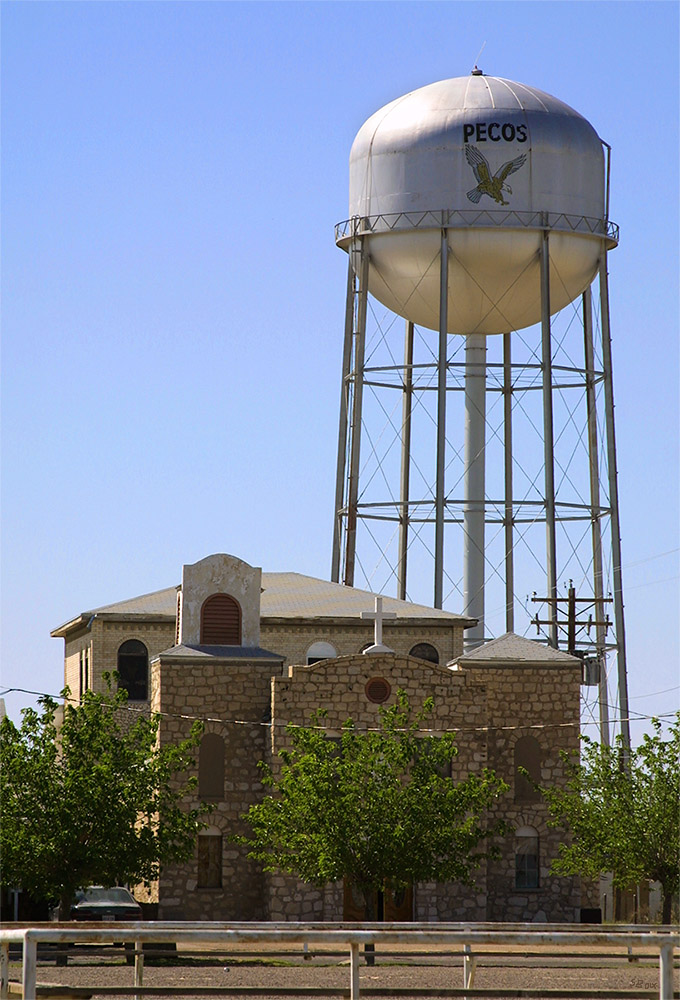
Water tower and the Santa Rosa church in Pecos, Texas

Pecos is one of the numerous towns in West Texas organized around a train depot during the construction of the Texas and Pacific Railway. These towns were subsequently linked by the construction of U.S. Highway 80 and Interstate 20. Prior to the arrival of the railroad, a permanent camp existed nearby where cattle drives crossed the Pecos River. With the introduction of irrigation from underground aquifers, the city became a center of commerce for extensive local agricultural production of cotton, onions, and cantaloupes. The introduction of large-scale sulfur mining in adjacent Culberson County during the 1960s led to significant economic and population growth. The growth was reversed after mining operations ceased in the 1990s.

In 1962, Pecos resident and tycoon Billie Sol Estes was indicted for fraud by a federal grand jury. Estes' extensive machinations caused a national-level scandal, resulting in a shakeup at the Department of Agriculture. Oscar Griffin, Jr., of the Pecos Independent and Enterprise newspaper won a Pulitzer Prize for breaking the story.

Pecos is the site of the largest private prison in the world, the Reeves County Detention Complex, operated by the GEO Group.

On December 18, 2024, a Union Pacific Railroad freight train hit a semi-trailer truck that was hauling an oversized load, with all locomotives and eleven cars derailing. Both crew members onboard the leading locomotive were killed and three people on the ground were injured. The former Texas & Pacific train depot, occupied by the town's Chamber of Commerce, was damaged during the derailment.

== Geography ==
According to the United States Census Bureau, the city has a total area of 7.3 square miles (19 km^{2}), all land.

== Demographics ==
Historical population
Census	Pop.	Note	%±
1890	393		—
1900	639		62.6%
1910	1,856		190.5%
1920	1,445		−22.1%
1930	3,304		128.7%
1940	4,855		46.9%
1950	8,054		65.9%
1960	12,728		58.0%
1970	12,682		−0.4%
1980	12,855		1.4%
1990	12,069		−6.1%
2000	9,501		−21.3%
2010	8,780		−7.6%
2020	12,916		47.1%
1890-2000, 2010

=== 2020 census ===
As of the 2020 census, Pecos had a population of 12,916. The median age was 36.9 years. 20.6% of residents were under the age of 18 and 12.2% of residents were 65 years of age or older. For every 100 females there were 166.2 males, and for every 100 females age 18 and over there were 188.1 males age 18 and over.

97.8% of residents lived in urban areas, while 2.2% lived in rural areas.

There were 3,516 households in Pecos, of which 37.4% had children under the age of 18 living in them. Of all households, 43.3% were married-couple households, 22.6% were households with a male householder and no spouse or partner present, and 28.0% were households with a female householder and no spouse or partner present. About 26.2% of all households were made up of individuals and 10.6% had someone living alone who was 65 years of age or older.

There were 4,166 housing units, of which 15.6% were vacant. The homeowner vacancy rate was 0.9% and the rental vacancy rate was 17.9%.

Racial composition as of the 2020 census
Race	Number	Percent
White	7,167	55.5%
Black or African American	278	2.2%
American Indian and Alaska Native	87	0.7%
Asian	163	1.3%
Native Hawaiian and Other Pacific Islander	2	0.0%
Some other race	2,097	16.2%
Two or more races	3,122	24.2%
Hispanic or Latino (of any race) (Note: Note: the US Census treats Hispanic/Latino as an ethnic category. This table excludes Latinos from the racial categories and assigns them to a separate category. Hispanics/Latinos can be of any race.)	11,129	86.2%

=== 2000 census ===
As of the census of 2000, 9,501 people, 3,168 households, and 2,455 families were residing in the city. The population density was 1,300 inhabitants per square mile (500/km^{2}). The 3,681 housing units averaged 504 per mi^{2} (194/km^{2}). The racial makeup of the city was 76.322% White, 2.45% African American, 0.46% Native American, 0.47% Asian, 18.07% from other races, and 22% from two or more races. Hispanics or Latinos of any race were 79.57% of the population.

Of the 3,168 households, 39.9% had children under 18 living with them, 59.0% were married couples living together, 14.9% had a female householder with no husband present, and 22.5% were not families. About 20.4% of all households were made up of individuals, and 9.6% had someone living alone who was 65 or older. The average household size was 2.97, and the average family size was 3.47.

In the city, the age distribution was 32.5% under 18, 8.7% from 18 to 24, 24.2% from 25 to 44, 21.7% from 45 to 64, and 13.0% who were 65 or older. The median age was 33 years. For every 100 females, there were 93.3 males. For every 100 females age 18 and over, there were 89.0 males.

The median income for a household in the city was $24,943, and for a family was $26,376. Males had a median income of $25,867 versus $13,874 for females. The per capita income for the city was $11,857. About 23% of families and 27% of the population were below the poverty line, including 36% of those under 18 and 16% of those 65 or over.

== Education ==
The City of Pecos is served by the Pecos-Barstow-Toyah Independent School District, which currently has four schools: Austin Elementary,(grades Pre K-1), Zavala Elementary, (grades 2-5), Crockett Middle School, (grades 6–8), and Pecos High School (grades 9–12).

== Climate ==
Pecos experiences a semiarid (BSk) to desert climate (BWh) with hot summers and mild winters. The city's aridity results in a substantial diurnal temperature variation, resulting in cool nights even after hot summer days.

Climate data for Pecos, Texas
Month	Jan	Feb	Mar	Apr	May	Jun	Jul	Aug	Sep	Oct	Nov	Dec	Year
Record high °F (°C)	89 (32)	94 (34)	103 (39)	106 (41)	112 (44)	118 (48)	116 (47)	113 (45)	110 (43)	106 (41)	94 (34)	89 (32)	118 (48)
Mean daily maximum °F (°C)	61 (16)	66 (19)	74 (23)	84 (29)	91 (33)	99 (37)	99 (37)	98 (37)	92 (33)	82 (28)	69 (21)	63 (17)	82 (28)
Mean daily minimum °F (°C)	28 (−2)	31 (−1)	38 (3)	48 (9)	57 (14)	67 (19)	69 (21)	68 (20)	61 (16)	50 (10)	35 (2)	29 (−2)	48 (9)
Record low °F (°C)	−9 (−23)	−8 (−22)	12 (−11)	24 (−4)	30 (−1)	48 (9)	55 (13)	45 (7)	37 (3)	25 (−4)	8 (−13)	1 (−17)	−9 (−23)
Average precipitation inches (mm)	0.42 (11)	0.38 (9.7)	0.33 (8.4)	0.57 (14)	1.14 (29)	1.11 (28)	1.33 (34)	1.24 (31)	1.85 (47)	1.16 (29)	0.47 (12)	0.49 (12)	10.48 (266)
Source: Weatherbase

== Notable people ==
- Billie Sol Estes, financier convicted of fraud
- Paul Gonzales, boxer, gold medalist at the 1984 Summer Olympic Games
- Oscar Griffin, Jr., recipient of 1963 Pulitzer Prize for Investigative Reporting
- Roger Mobley, later child actor, resided in Pecos in the 1950s
- Abel Talamantez, singer of Menudo, MDO and the Kumbia Kings
