= Farm to Market Road 3078 =

Road in Texas, United States

Farm to Market Road 3078

Route information
- Maintained by TxDOT
- Length: 14.678 mi (23.622 km)
- Existed: 1992–present
- History: Formerly a route in Maverick and Zavala counties

Major junctions
- West end: I-10
- East end: SH 17 in Toyahvale

Location
- Country: United States
- State: Texas
- Counties: Reeves, Jeff Davis

Highway system
- Highways in Texas; Interstate; US; State; Former; Toll; Loops; Spurs; FM/RM; Park; Rec
← FM 3077	→ FM 3079

Farm to Market Road 3078 (FM 3078) is a 14.7-mile (23.7 km) road maintained by the Texas Department of Transportation (TxDOT) that connects Interstate 10 (I-10) to State Highway 17 (SH 17) in Toyahvale. The route is in Jeff Davis and Reeves counties and connects Toyahvale to points farther west along I-10 including Kent and Van Horn. FM 3078 is part of the state's Farm and Ranch to Market Road System.

Between 1966 and 1983 the numerical designation was assigned to a road in Maverick and Zavala counties. The current road was previously assigned as SH 27 and then U.S. Route 290 before the completion of I-10 locally.

The road was part of a major route connecting El Paso to central and southern Texas and was accordingly constructed better than its current designation would suggest. The road is entirely rural in nature with no major intersections between its termini.

== Route description ==
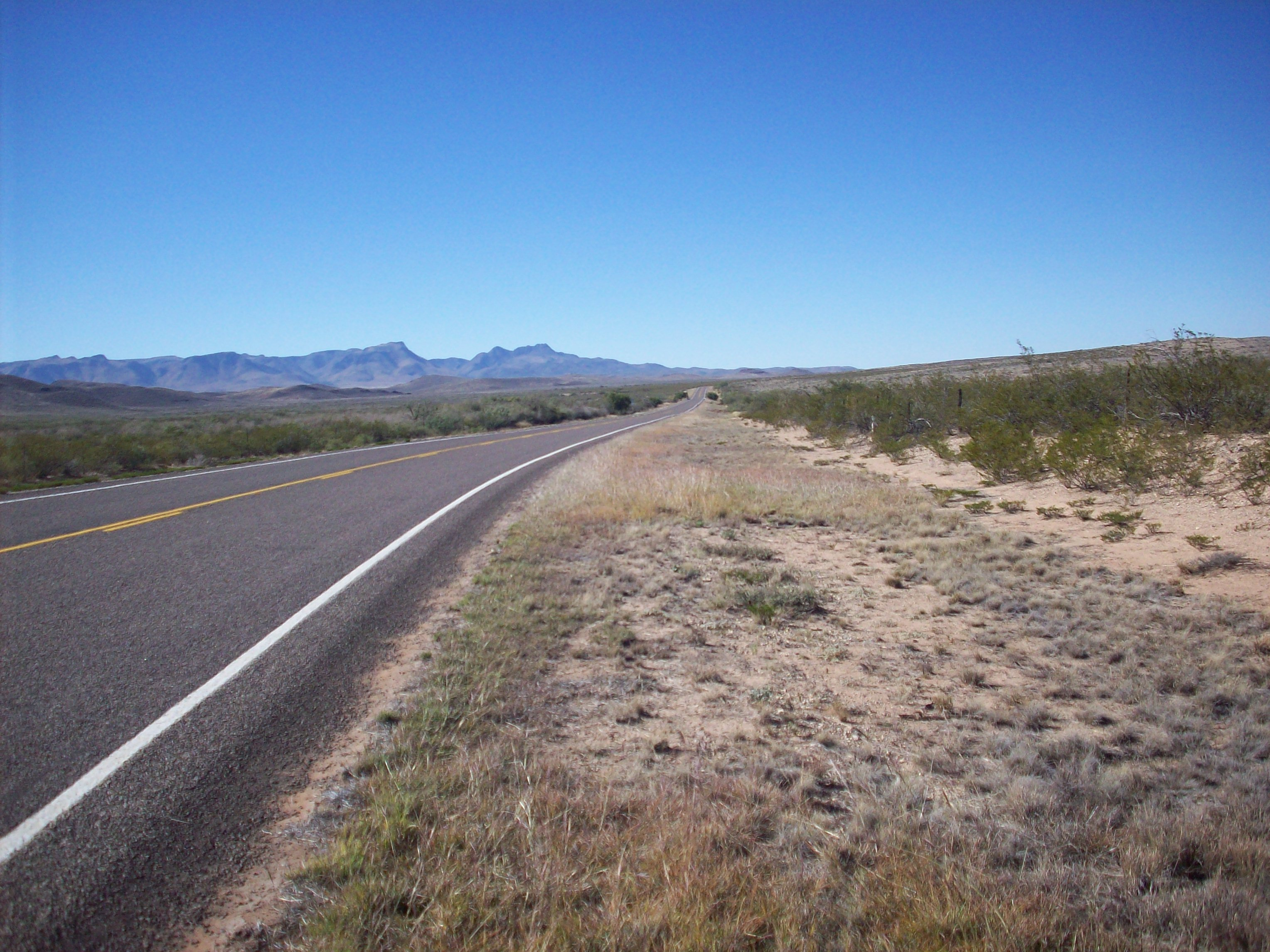
FM 3078 in northeastern Jeff Davis County

FM 3078 status as a former U.S. highway during construction makes it built beyond the usual standards as a farm to market road. The two-lane road has broad lanes and paved shoulders. The road has bridges over all water crossings and no sharp turns or curves allowing a 70-mile per hour speed limit. The road travels through ranch land just north of the foothills of the Davis Mountains. There are no major intersections along the length of the road, and the road passes through no cities or towns before reaching its eastern terminus at Toyahvale. Along SH 17 about 0.33 miles (0.53 km) beyond the terminus at Toyahvale is a junction with Park Road 30 at Balmorhea State Park.

The western terminus at I-10 is in Reeves County. The road enters Jeff Davis County 5.0 miles (8.0 km) eastward. The route is in Jeff Davis County for 4.7 miles (7.6 km) before returning to Reeves County for the remainder of the route.

== History ==
=== Previous route ===
A previous route designated Ranch to Market Road 3078 (RM 3078) was designated on June 21, 1966, from SH 76 (now US 57) to a point 7.0 miles (11.3 km) northeast. On April 25, 1978, the road was extended northeast 4.0 miles (6.4 km) and renamed FM 3078. On January 23, 1980, the road was extended northeast 17.7 miles (28.5 km) to FM 481 at the Zavala–Uvalde county line. FM 3078 was cancelled on July 8, 1983, and transferred to FM 481.

=== Current route ===
The present route was originally part of SH 27. That highway had been proposed as early as 1919 and, after TxDOT's predecessor, the Texas Highway Department, gained authority to maintain state highways in 1924, SH 17 had become part of the state highway system by 1933 and concurrent with US 290. By 1939, the SH 27 designation along the present day FM 3078 had been cancelled.

In the early 1980s, the I-10 bypass around Balmorhea and Toyahvale had been completed. With the completion of the Interstate, US 290 through much of West Texas became largely concurrent with the Interstate separating only to serve as a sort of business route into towns bypassed by the Interstate. With the creation of Interstate business routes, US 290 became obsolete on the portion running along I-10 and its route designation over that portion was canceled on November 21, 1991. The entire portion of US 290 through Toyahvale and Balmorhea, part of which was concurrent with SH 17, did not become a new Interstate business route. Instead, Business Route 10-F separated from I-10 at FM 2903 to enter Balmorhea and rejoin the Interstate along SH 17. FM 3078 was designated in 1992 along the portion of US 290 between I-10 and SH 17 to allow that stretch of highway not concurrent with SH 17 to have a highway designation when the US 290 designation was canceled.

== Major intersections ==
County	Location	mi	km	Destinations	Notes
Reeves		0.0	0.0	I-10	Western terminus
Jeff Davis	No major junctions				
Reeves	Toyahvale	14.7	23.7	SH 17	Eastern terminus
1.000 mi = 1.609 km; 1.000 km = 0.621 mi
