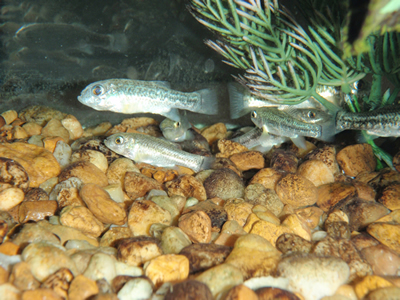

Conservation status
- Endangered (IUCN 3.1)

Scientific classification
- Kingdom: Animalia
- Phylum: Chordata
- Class: Actinopterygii
- Division: Teleostei
- Order: Cyprinodontiformes
- Family: Cyprinodontidae
- Genus: Cyprinodon
- Species: C. elegans

Binomial name
- Cyprinodon elegans S. F. Baird & Girard, 1853

= Comanche Springs pupfish =

Species of fish

The Comanche Springs pupfish (Cyprinodon elegans) is a species of pupfish in the family Cyprinodontidae. It is endemic to Texas, and is now found only in spring-fed pools near Balmorhea, a small town in West Texas.

== Taxonomy and naming ==
Discovery and formal description of the Comanche Springs pupfish occurred in 1853.

The Comanche Springs pupfish was named for the now dry Comanche Springs, an aquifer of six artesian springs in Pecos County, Texas.

== Description ==
The Comanche Springs pupfish stands out amongst cogeners due to the striking speckled color pattern of the males, as well as a more streamlined body shape and lack of vertical bars. The back is relatively flat. The species reaches a maximum length of around 50 mm (2.0 in).

Differences also occur between members of the species from different locations in the number of fin rays and patterns of belly scales.

== Distribution and habitat ==
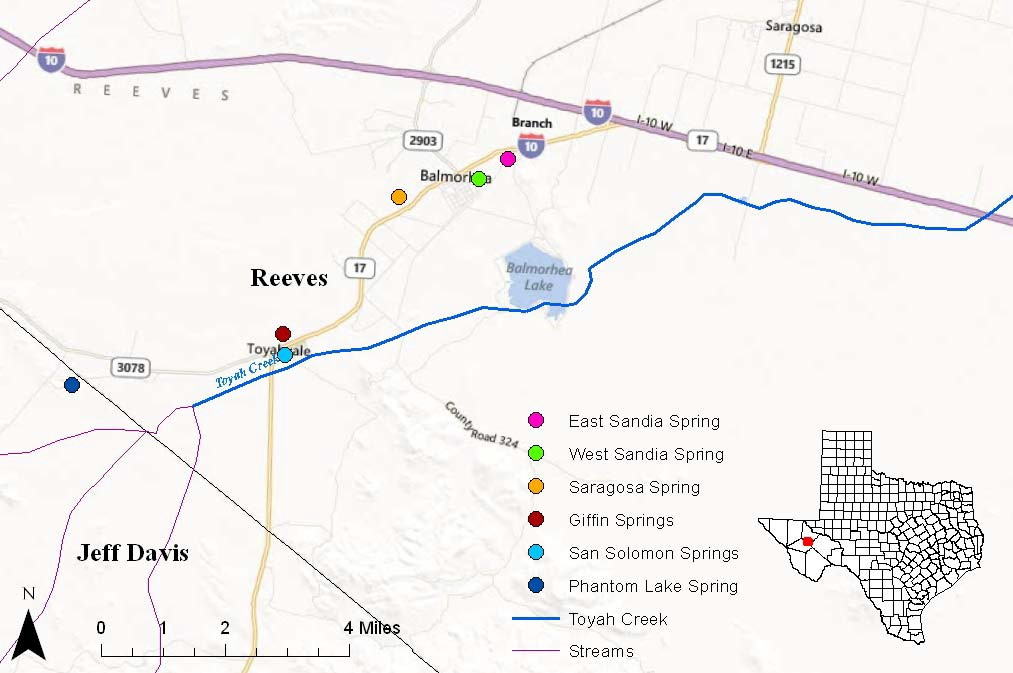
Location of springs near Balmorhea, Texas. Confirmed Comanche Springs pupfish populations are currently only present at San Solomon Spring, Phantom Lake Spring, Giffin Spring, Toyah Creek, and the associated irrigation canal system.

Comanche Springs pupfish are currently found in a system of interconnected springs near Balmorhea, Texas: Phantom Lake Spring in Jeff Davis County, Texas, and San Solomon Springs, and Giffin Spring, as well as Toyah Creek, in Reeves County, Texas. Base water flow for these springs comes from the Edwards-Trinity aquifer system. Additionally, runoff from the Davis Mountains recharges the overlying, alluvial aquifers. Quantity and quality of habitat respond rapidly to these recharge events. Historically, these springs formed extensive marshes that likely supported large numbers of pupfish. Toyah Creek is intermittent, only flowing after heavy rainfall, and as a result only occasionally provides pupfish habitat. A population formerly existed in Comanche Springs in Fort Stockton, Texas, for which the species was named. These springs went dry in 1955, resulting in the extirpation of the local pupfish population. Small numbers of pupfish have also been found immediately downstream of East Sandia Spring during surveys in 1993 and 2001. West Sandia Spring and Saragosa Spring, though now mostly dry, likely supported the species before human modification.

Most of the surviving habitat has been converted to a sixty-mile (97 km) network of interconnected concrete or earthen irrigation canals. Water flow in these canals is swift and often ephemeral, and much of the network is unsuitable for use by pupfish. Because the water in the canals is sometimes diverted, resulting in mortalities, the canals are not considered permanent habitat, but rather serve as connections between larger populations in the springs.

Low water levels in the aquifer have greatly reduced flow from Phantom Lake Spring, which led to the drying of the canals and reduction of pupfish habitat to a single pool at the cave from which the spring flows. As a result, the U.S. Fish and Wildlife Service filled in the old canals and constructed a more natural ciénega at the cave mouth. A pumping system was put in place to maintain water levels, and an alarm alerts authorities to failures in the pump system.

Artificial refugia for the species have also been constructed at Balmorhea State Park, which contains San Solomon spring. The entire head of this spring was converted into a concrete-lined swimming pool by the Civilian Conservation Corps in the 1930s, destroying the natural ciénega. The first refugium, a 275-metre (902 ft) long concrete-lined canal curving around the park motel, was completed in 1975. 1996 saw the addition of a 2.5 ha (6.2 acres) ciénega within the grounds of the park, designed to replicate the appearance and functionality of the original. This wetland now contains the largest known concentrations of Comanche Springs pupfish. Finally, from 2009 to 2010, a second small ciénega was built adjacent to the 1975 canal in order to replace the older, deteriorating structure.

This fish prefers water temperatures between 20-30 °C, and cannot survive above 40 °C. It occurs in water with lower salinity than that occupied by other pupfish species within the Pecos River system, suggesting a long interval of isolation.

== Diet and feeding ==
The diet of adult Comanche Springs pupfish consists mostly of filamentous algae as well as some snails, while juveniles subsist solely on infusoria until they grow larger.

== Reproduction ==
Comanche Springs pupfish spawn year-round in spring outflows and small pools. Females reach sexual maturity at 5 months of age. Males use visual cues to identify and establish a territory. They select sites over algal mats in swift-moving water. Males take a position upstream of their territory thus allowing them to use the current to make high-speed attacks on intruders. Females will enter the territory from downstream and select a breeding site on the algal mat. The female lays her eggs singly, up to 30 a day, onto the algal mat or rock. The male aggressively guards the eggs until hatching. Less dominant, average-sized males occupy the periphery of the larger male territories, while the smallest males, known as sneaker males, mimic the coloration of females in order to access eggs in the territories of dominant males without provoking an attack. Breeding behavior is similar in slow-moving water except that the territories are centered around a convenient landmark such as a rock or patch of plants.

Eggs average around 1.5 mm (0.059 in) in diameter, and hatch within 5 days at 20 °C. Newly hatched fry retain a relatively large yolk sack. Growth is rapid, and sexual maturity is reached at 5 months.

Most Comanche Springs pupfish live for roughly one year.

== Conservation status ==
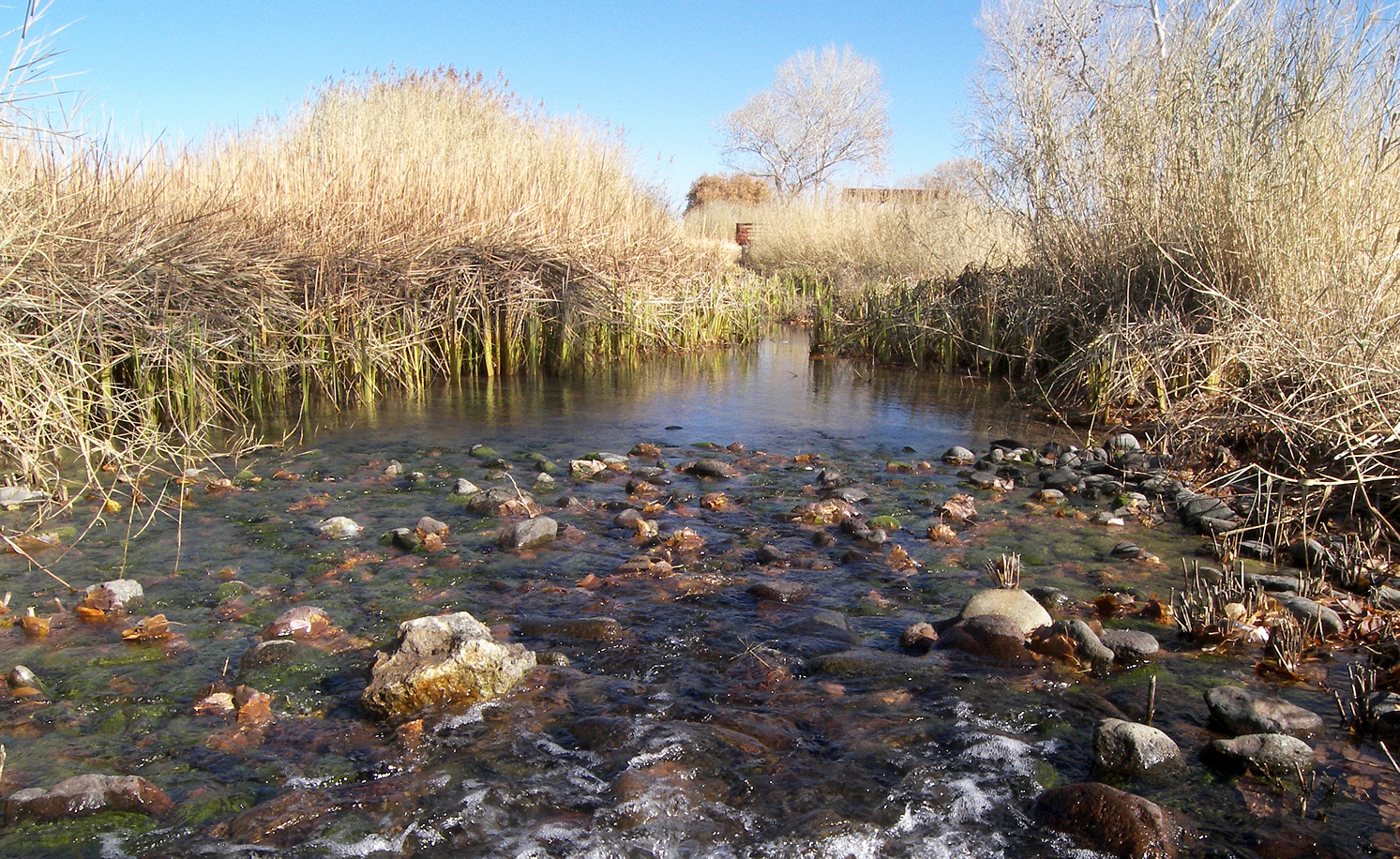
A restored ciénega in Balmorhea State Park

The Comanche Springs pupfish is included on the IUCN Red List of endangered species and was federally listed as endangered by the U.S. Government in 1967. Threats to this species include loss of habitat due to human alteration, reduced spring flows due to high levels of water mining, and competition from introduced species.

Modification of the Balmorhea area spring system starting in 1875 destroyed most of the natural marsh and stream habitat. Construction of irrigation canals diverted water into agricultural fields, leading to the drying out of marshy areas and increasing the speed at which water left the spring area.

In addition to Comanche Springs, the type locale for this species, a number of other springs in the area have gone dry as a result of the pumping of irrigation water from the aquifer, demonstrating the vulnerability of the remaining springs to desiccation. It is possible that continued pumping from deep-lying aquifers could eventually cause the entire Balmorhea spring system to dry up.

Historic stocking of black bass species into the irrigation canals of the Phantom Cave Spring system likely severely impacted that population of pupfish. The introduction of another Cyprinodon species, the sheepshead minnow, into Lake Balmorhea has resulted in a hybrid zone where the two species interbreed in the lower reaches of the Phantom Cave irrigation canals. One study found that when these hybrid offspring mated with Comanche Springs pupfish the resulting backcrossed offspring had lower fitness than those resulting from matings with sheepshead minnows, which could potentially result in extinction of the Comanche Springs pupfish through hybridization. As of 2013, physical barriers have prevented the sheepshead minnow from spreading further upstream in the spring system.

Captive breeding stocks of the Comanche Springs pupfish are maintained at the Southwestern Native Aquatic Resources and Recovery Center (SNARRC) in Dexter, New Mexico, and the Uvalde National Fish Hatchery in Uvalde County, Texas. The Uvalde population is derived from individuals taken from the morphologically distinct Phantom Lake Spring subpopulation. In 2013, the total stock at the two facilities was 17,500 individuals. These stocks provide fish that can be used to replenish natural populations in the event of a catastrophic loss. Additionally, researchers can draw from the captive stocks instead of collecting wild fish.

The Comanche Springs pupfish is further at risk simply due to the susceptibility of the small population to random catastrophic loss, such as a natural disaster. The risk of extinction for any one species is known to be strongly indirectly correlated to its population size.
