= Texas State Highway 17 =

State highway in Texas

State Highway 17
- SH 17 highlighted in red

Route information
- Maintained by TxDOT
- Length: 92.118 mi (148.250 km)
- Existed: April 4, 1917–present

Major junctions
- South end: US 67 / US 90 in Marfa
- SH 166 near Fort Davis; SH 118 in Fort Davis; I-10 near Saragosa; I-20 in Pecos
- North end: Bus. I-20-B in Pecos

Location
- Country: United States
- State: Texas
- Counties: Presidio, Jeff Davis, Reeves

Highway system
- Highways in Texas; Interstate; US; State; Former; Toll; Loops; Spurs; FM/RM; Park; Rec
← PR 16	→ SH 18

State Highway 17 (SH 17) runs from Marfa to Pecos in west Texas. The road is maintained by the Texas Department of Transportation (TxDOT).

== Route description ==
SH 17 begins at Marfa in Presidio County, passes through Jeff Davis County, and terminates at Pecos in Reeves County.

=== Presidio County ===
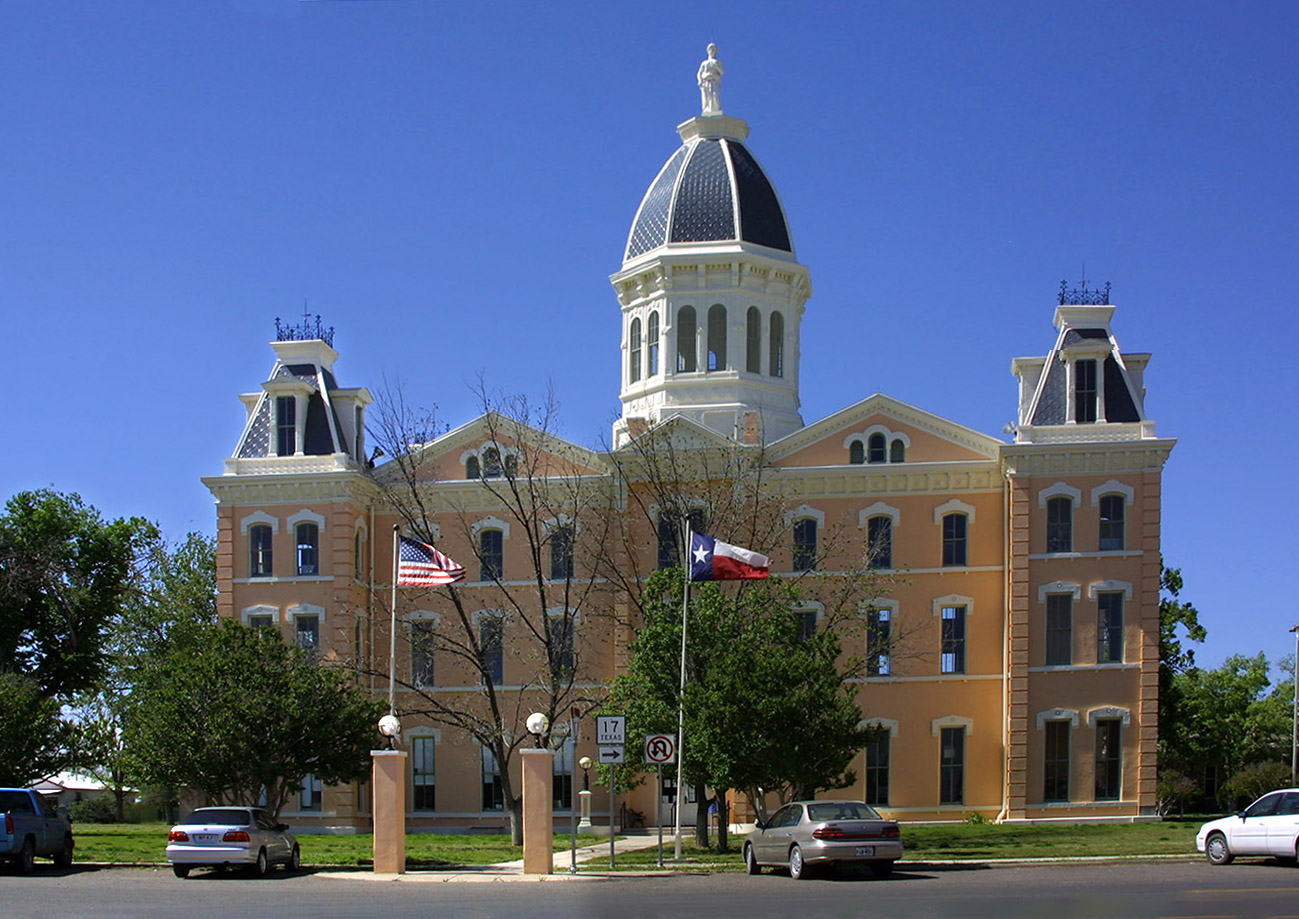
Presidio County Courthouse with SH 17 route marker in front

SH 17 begins at an intersection of San Antonio Street and Highland Avenue. In Marfa, San Antonio Street is US 90. US 67 enters the intersection from the south along S. Highland Avenue, then turns east along E. San Antonio Street becoming concurrent with US 90. SH 17 proceeds north along Highland Avenue.

After two blocks, SH 17 intersects the beginning of Farm to Market Road 1112 (FM 1112 which proceeds eastward along E. Oak Street which runs parallel to the Union Pacific Railroad.

SH 17 proceeds north an additional two blocks, then turns east along E. Lincoln Street directly in front of the Presidio County Courthouse. One block later, the route turns north and leaves Marfa along N. Dean Street. North of town, the route passes Marfa Municipal Airport.

SH 17 continues toward Fort Davis as a two-lane roadway with a 75 miles per hour (121 km/h) speed limit. The route follows mostly straight stretches with no sharp turns or steep grades through open ranch land.

=== Jeff Davis County ===
Soon after entering Jeff Davis County, SH 17 continues through a gentle pass across the Puertacitas Mountains. The route then passes along mostly straight stretches through ranch land. Approximately 2 miles (3.2 km) south of Fort Davis, the route intersects the western terminus of SH 166. At this point, SH 17 joins the Davis Mountains Scenic Loop.

The road then enters Fort Davis where the route is called State Street. SH 17 intersects SH 118 approaching from the east via Musquiz Drive just south of the Jeff Davis County Courthouse. At this junction, SH 17 joins the Texas Historical Commission's Texas Mountain Trail. SH 118 runs concurrently down State Street through town and past Fort Davis National Historic Site for a distance of 1.3 miles (2.1 km). The route intersects Lt. Flipper Drive, the entrance to the historic site. Across from the historic site, the route intersects Blackfoot Drive, known locally as Old Balmorhea Road which is the route's former unpaved roadway before the establishment of the state highway system. Just beyond the historic site, the route intersects Canyon Drive. At this point, SH 118, Davis Mountains Scenic Loop, and the Texas Mountain Trail leave the route and continue west along Canyon Dr. toward Davis Mountains State Park, McDonald Observatory, and Kent.

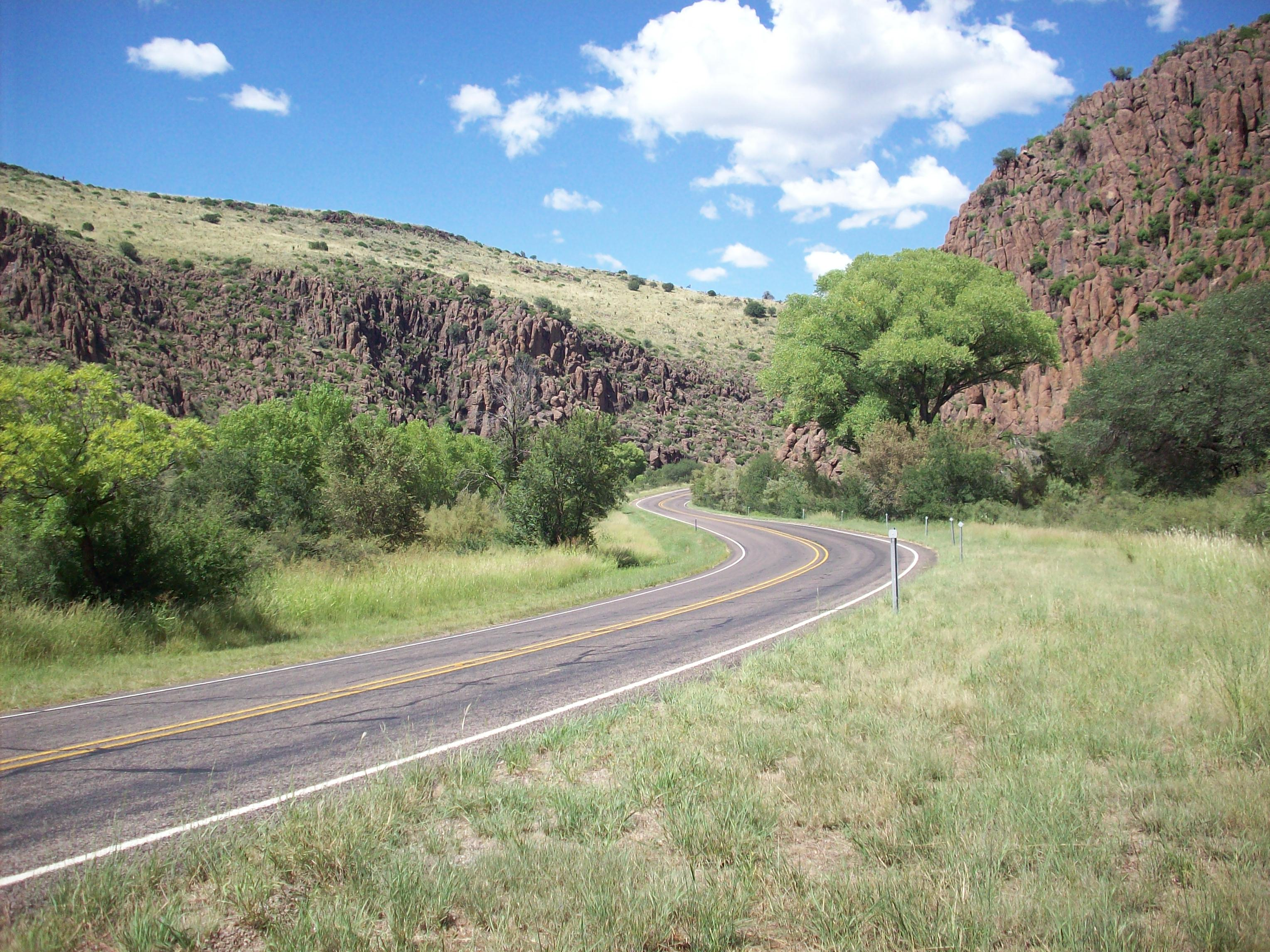
SH 17 north of Fort Davis in Limpia Canyon

Blackfoot Drive merges back with the route as SH 17 leaves town continuing northward through Limpia Canyon in the Davis Mountains with a maximum speed limit of 55 miles per hour (89 km/h). In Limpia Canyon, the road has many curves, some with recommended speeds as low as 40 miles per hour (64 km/h) as indicated by warning signs. There are also several picnic tables in the canyon followed by one large picnic area just before reaching Wild Rose Pass. About 2.4 miles (3.9 km) past this pass, the speed limit increases to 75 miles per hour (121 km/h). The route remains a two-lane road, but from this point onward there are places where passing lanes occur.

Continuing northward, the route intersects the eastern terminus of RM 1832 approaching from Buffalo Trails Boy Scout Ranch. SH 17 then continues through ranch land and leaves the Davis Mountains before leaving the county.

=== Reeves County ===
The route continues northward and intersects FM 3078 at Toyahvale. FM 3078 is the former roadway of US 290 before it was replaced by Interstate 10 (I-10). SH 17 turns east onto the former US 290 roadway and reaches Texas Park Road 30 into Balmorhea State Park at Toyahvale.

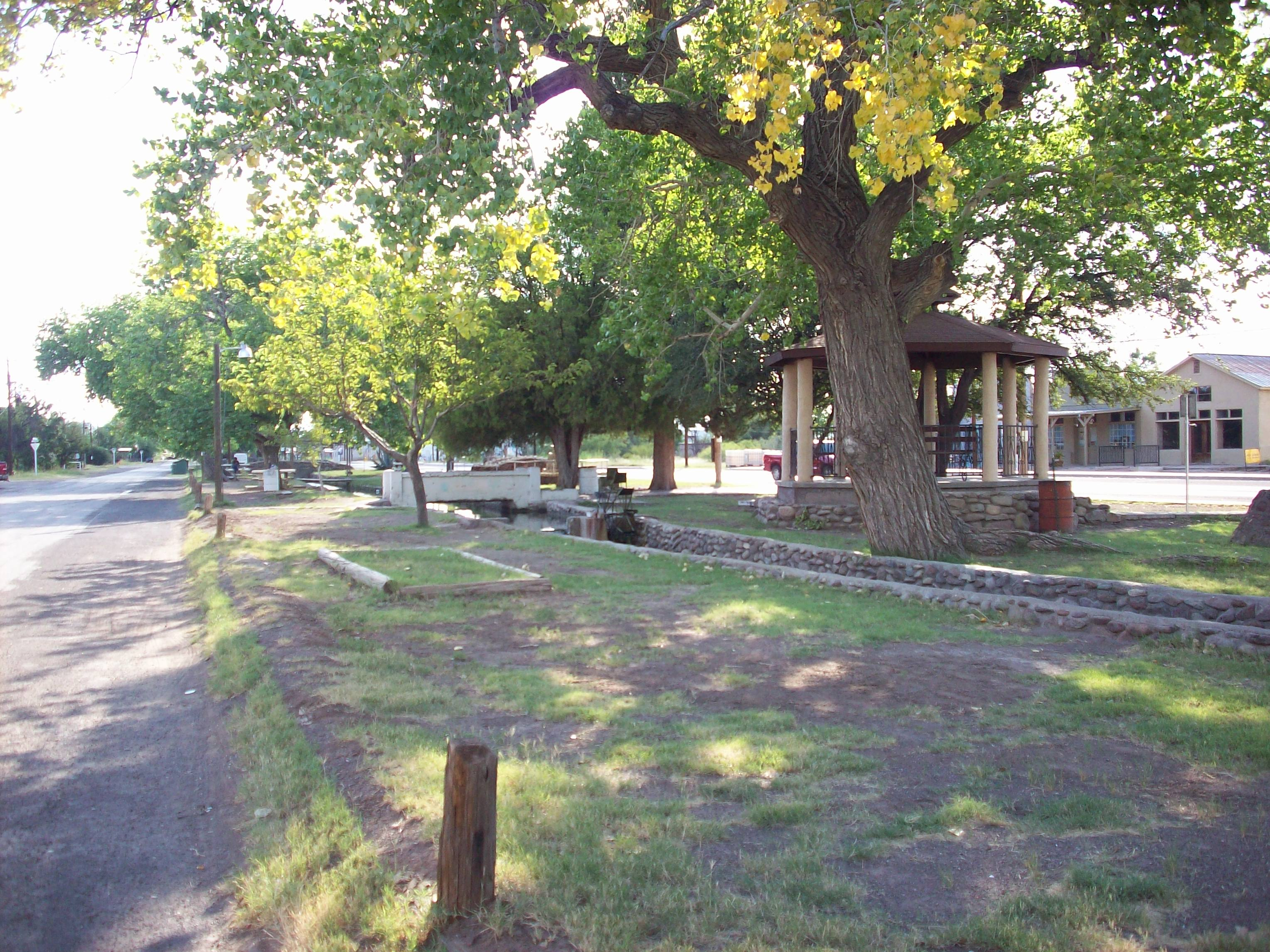
Canal in Balmorhea city park along SH 17

Continuing into Balmorhea, the route passes fields of alfalfa watered from irrigation ditches including one running parallel with the highway. In Balmorhea, this irrigation channel becomes the centerpiece of a city park along one side of SH 17 here known as Main Street. The route intersects Business Interstate 10-F at North Fort Worth Street. I-10 Bus. Loop F going northward becomes FM 2903 to Toyah after crossing I-10. Eastward, I-10 Bus. Loop F overlays the route of SH 17.

After Balmorhea, the route has a speed limit of 55 miles per hour (89 km/h) and passes just north of the foothills of the Davis Mountains and through the small community of Brogado before reaching I-10. At I-10 Exit 209, I-10 Bus. Loop F ends, and SH 17 merges with the Interstate for slightly more than 2 miles (3.2 km) with a speed limit of 80 miles per hour (130 km/h). SH 17 leaves I-10 at Exit 212 and heads northward with a speed limit of 70 miles per hour (110 km/h) toward Saragosa. At Saragosa, the route intersects FM 1215 which merges with SH 17 and the speed limit lowers to 55 miles per hour (89 km/h). In the center of Saragosa, FM 1215 turns westward at West Main Street and loops back to end at the north service road of I-10 and SH 17 without crossing or intersecting the main Interstate roadway.

Beyond Saragosa, the route begins to parallel the route of the Pecos Valley Southern Railway which will follow SH 17 the rest of the way into Pecos. The speed limit gradually increases to 65 miles per hour (105 km/h) before intersecting FM 2448. The speed limit then increases to 75 miles per hour (121 km/h) as the route passes through cotton fields with occasional oil wells. The route then intersects FM 3334 before passing through the small community of Verhalen. The route then intersects FM 869 and later FM 1934.

The route passes alongside the community of Lindsay as it approaches the outskirts of Pecos. The route then passes Pecos Municipal Airport. The speed limit gradually lowers to 55 miles per hour (89 km/h) and then widens to four lanes before reaching I-20. In Pecos, the route intersects I-20 at Exit 39 then continues north as South Bickley Avenue. The route then intersects FM 761 at Stafford Boulevard. Then, further north, SH 17 terminates at West 3rd Street where it intersects Business Interstate 20-B.

== History ==
Historic SH 17

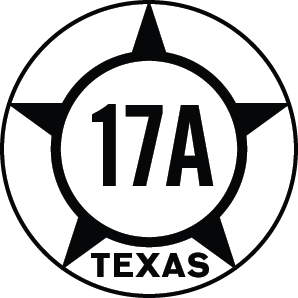
Historic SH 17A

SH 17 was one of the original 25 highways proposed in Texas on June 21, 1917. The original route was to be from another proposed route State Highway 12 running along the Rio Grande to Sanderson, then through Fort Stockton and Pecos to the New Mexico state line. On February 20, 1918, SH 17 was rerouted north of Fort Stockton, going through Grandfalls and Barstow to Pecos. On January 23, 1922, a separate route, SH 17A, running from Balmorhea to Pecos was designated. On July 18, 1922, SH 17 was rerouted north of Grandfalls, with a spur along the old route from Grandfalls to Barstow, and SH 17A extended south to Alpine via Fort Davis.

All route descriptions before 1924 were merely proposals. The Texas Highway Department, a precursor of the Texas Department of Transportation, did not have the authority to assume maintenance of roads from the counties until 1924, nor the authority to plan, survey, or build new roads until 1925. On August 21, 1923, the section of SH 17 south of SH 17A had been transferred to SH 82, while SH 17A and the section of SH 17 north of SH 17A was reclassified as the main route of SH 17. The spur from Grandfalls to Barstow was cancelled. On May 1, 1931, SH 17 was extended through Marfa to end in Presidio, replacing SH 118 (which was reassigned on the former route of SH 3 southeast of Fort Davis) and a section of SH 3. On June 20, 1933, the stretch from Pecos to New Mexico had been transferred to SH 27. On September 26, 1939, the stretch from Presidio to Marfa was transferred to U.S. Highway 67 (the routes were concurrent before this).

== Major intersections ==
County	Location	mi	km	Destinations	Notes
Presidio	Marfa	0	0.0	US 67 / US 90 – Presidio, Valentine, Alpine	
Presidio	Marfa	0.1	0.16	FM 1112 east (Oak Street)	
Jeff Davis		18.8	30.3	SH 166 north (scenic loop) – Valentine	
Jeff Davis	Fort Davis	21.1	34.0	SH 118 south – Alpine	south end of SH 118 overlap
Jeff Davis	Fort Davis	22.1	35.6	Lieutenant Flipper Drive - Fort Davis National Historic Site	
Jeff Davis	Fort Davis	22.5	36.2	SH 118 north (scenic loop) – Kent, Davis Mountain State Park, McDonald Observatory	north end of SH 118 overlap
Jeff Davis		46.6	75.0	RM 1832 west	
Reeves	Toyahvale	53.4	85.9	FM 3078 west to I-10 west – Van Horn, Kent	former US 290 west
Reeves		53.8	86.6	PR 30 – Balmorhea State Park	
Reeves	Balmorhea	58.0	93.3	I-10 BL west (Fort Worth Street) to FM 2903 / I-10 – Toyah, El Paso	south end of I-10 Bus. overlap
Reeves		60.9	98.0	I-10 west	north end of I-10 Bus. overlap; south end of I-10 overlap; SH 17 south follows exit 209
Reeves		63.1	101.5	I-10 east to FM 2448 – Fort Stockton	north end of I-10 overlap; SH 17 north follows exit 212
Reeves	Saragosa	64.6	104.0	FM 1215 east to FM 2448	south end of FM 1215 overlap
Reeves	Saragosa	65.1	104.8	FM 1215 west to I-10	north end of FM 1215 overlap
Reeves		70.1	112.8	FM 2448 south to I-10	
Reeves		72.2	116.2	FM 3334 west to FM 2903	
Reeves		80.2	129.1	FM 869 north to I-20	
Reeves		88.6	142.6	FM 1934 west to FM 869	
Reeves	Pecos	93.3	150.2	I-20 – El Paso, Monahans	I-20 exit 39
Reeves	Pecos	93.6	150.6	FM 761 east (Stafford Boulevard)	
Reeves	Pecos	94.6	152.2	I-20 BL	
1.000 mi = 1.609 km; 1.000 km = 0.621 mi
