= Texas Park Road 30 =

Highway in Texas

PR 30
- Balmorhea State Park Road
- PR 30 highlighted in red

Route information
- Maintained by TxDOT
- Length: 0.277 mi (446 m)
- Existed: 1941–present

Major junctions
- South end: Balmorhea State Park
- North end: SH 17 in Toyahvale

Location
- Country: United States
- State: Texas
- Counties: Reeves

Highway system
- Highways in Texas; Interstate; US; State; Former; Toll; Loops; Spurs; FM/RM; Park; Rec
← FM 30	→ SH 31

Park Road 30 (PR 30), also known as Balmorhea State Park Road, is a short Park Road located in the western region of the U.S. state of Texas. The route is 0.277 miles (0.446 km) long, and connects Balmorhea State Park to State Highway 17 (SH 17) in Toyahvale in southwestern Reeves County. The route is made up of several individual drives within the park. The route was first built by the CCC in the mid-1930s, and was designated as PR 30 in 1941. The highway is maintained by the Texas Department of Transportation (TxDOT).

== Route description ==
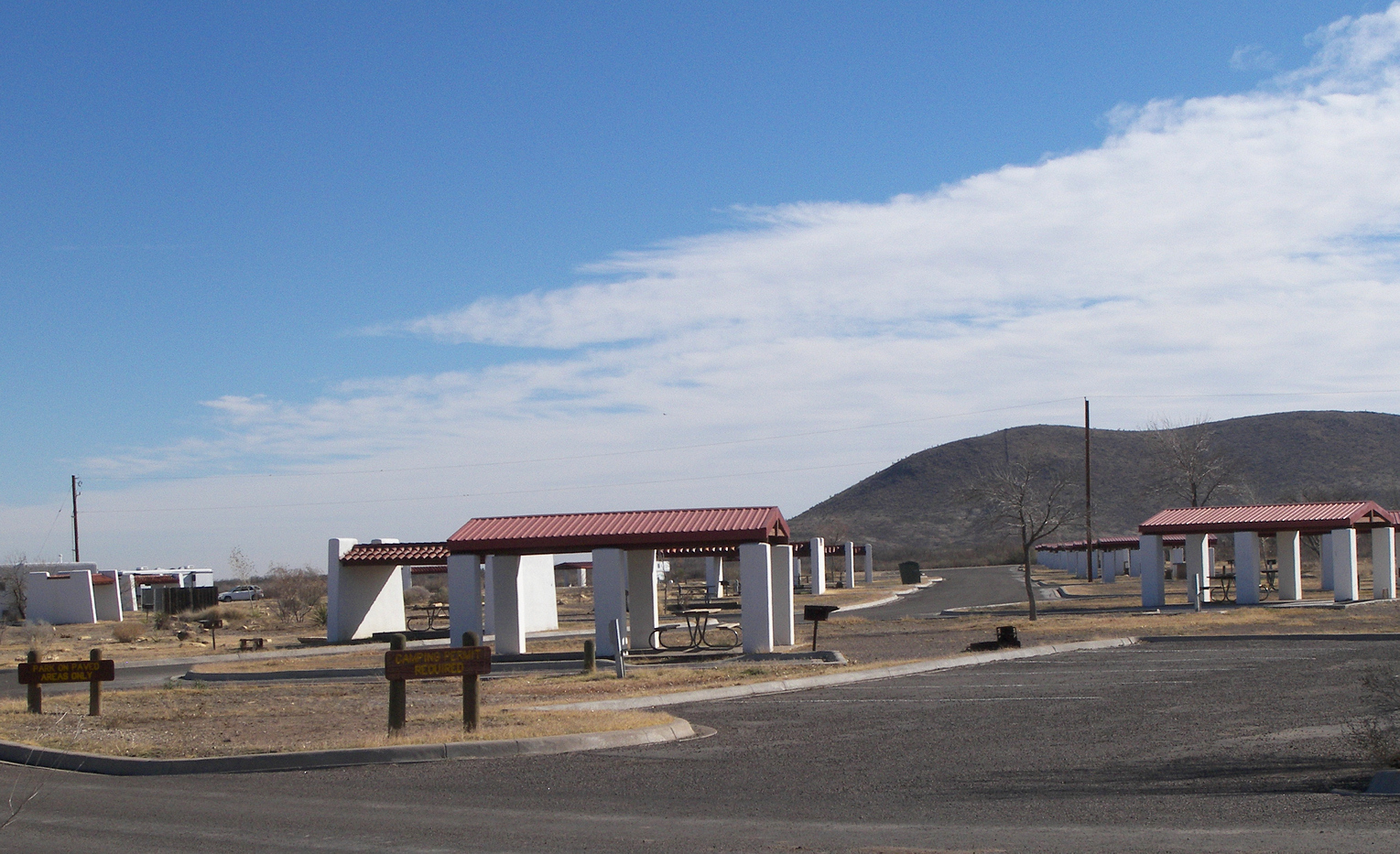
Camping area at Balmorhea State Park

The main roadway of PR 30 begins at the circulating drive around the parking lot in front of the concession building of the swimming pool at San Solomon Springs. The route proceeds to the north with a spur branching off to the east to the San Solomon Springs Courts before passing the park headquarters near the terminus of the road at SH 17.

An extension of PR 30 begins at the entrance to the San Solomon Springs parking lot and proceeds to the east to the park campground. At the campground, the route ends as a circular drive accessing individual camping spaces and a viewing exhibit for a reconstructed desert wetland. The circular drive is bisected by another drive with bath facilities and campsites for recreational vehicles.

== History ==
The main portion of PR 30 from the parking lot at the swimming pool to SH 17 including the spur to the San Solomon Springs Courts was constructed between 1935 and 1940 by Company 1856 of the Civilian Conservation Corps. An 0.66-mile (1.06 km) long stretch of the spur was designated as PR 30 on April 23, 1941. On May 30, 1961, the modern routing of PR 30 was designated, including the eastward extension toward the campgrounds.

== Major intersections ==
This entire route is located in Balmorhea State Park, Reeves County.

mi	km	Destinations	Notes
0.000	0.000	SH 17 – Balmorhea	Southern terminus
0.277	0.446	Park campgrounds	Northern terminus
1.000 mi = 1.609 km; 1.000 km = 0.621 mi
