= Pecos Valley Southern Railway =

Short-line railroad in Texas, United States

The Pecos Valley Southern Railway (reporting mark PVS) is a short-line railroad headquartered in Pecos, Texas, United States.

PVS operates a 29.3 miles (47.2 km) line from Saragosa to an interchange with Union Pacific at Pecos. The line generally parallels State Highway 17. The railroad's traffic consists mainly of crude oil, sand, gravel, and barite ore.

== History ==
The line was opened on May 1, 1910, between Pecos and Toyahvale (a distance of 40.1 miles (64.5 km)). The segment between Toyahvale and Saragosa was abandoned in 1971.

From 1927 to 1946, the railroad was controlled by the Texas and Pacific Railroad (now part of Union Pacific). The railroad was popular with tourists who rode trains from Pecos to San Solomon Springs (now Balmorhea State Park).

On September 1, 2012, the Pecos Valley Southern Railroad (PVSR) began operating as a subsidiary of Watco Transportation Services, LLC, under a long-term lease agreement reached with PVSR.

== Bibliography ==
- Lustig, David (July 1998). "Pecos Valley Southern: The loneliest short line in Texas". Trains. 58 (7): 42–47.
