= Astranthium robustum =

Scientific classification
- Kingdom: Plantae
- Clade: Tracheophytes
- Clade: Angiosperms
- Clade: Eudicots
- Clade: Asterids
- Order: Asterales
- Family: Asteraceae
- Genus: Astranthium
- Species: A. robustum

Binomial name
- Astranthium robustum (Shinners) DeJong

Synonyms
- Astranthium integrifolium var. robustum Shinners

Species of flowering plant

Astranthium robustum, the Texas western-daisy, is a North American species of flowering plants in the family Asteraceae. It is found only in the western (trans-Pecos) part of the US State of Texas.

Astranthium robustum is an annual with a taproot, and usually with several stems up to 50 cm (20 inches) tall. Flower heads have white or bluish ray florets and yellow disc florets.
