= Lindsay, Texas =

Lindsay, Texas may refer to:

- Lindsay, Cooke County, Texas
- Lindsay, Reeves County, Texas
