= Solidago juliae =

Scientific classification
- Kingdom: Plantae
- Clade: Tracheophytes
- Clade: Angiosperms
- Clade: Eudicots
- Clade: Asterids
- Order: Asterales
- Family: Asteraceae
- Genus: Solidago
- Species: S. juliae

Binomial name
- Solidago juliae G.L.Nesom

Synonyms
- Solidago altissima var. canescens (A.Gray) M.C.Johnst., not Solidago canescens (Rydb.) Friesner; Solidago canadensis var. canescens A. Gray, not Solidago canescens (Rydb.) Friesner

Species of flowering plant

Solidago juliae, known as Julia's goldenrod, is a plant native to central and western Texas (trans-Pecos and Edwards Plateau regions), as well as southern Arizona, Chihuahua, Coahuila and Nuevo León. It occurs in grasslands, woodlands, and on freshwater shores.

Solidago juliae is a perennial herb sometimes as much as 250 cm (100 inches or 8 1/3 feet) tall. One plant can produce as many as 950 yellowflower heads, borne in a large showy panicle at the top of the plant. Each head contains 9-15 ray florets surrounding 5-9 disc florets.

Species is named for Julia Wells Nesom.
