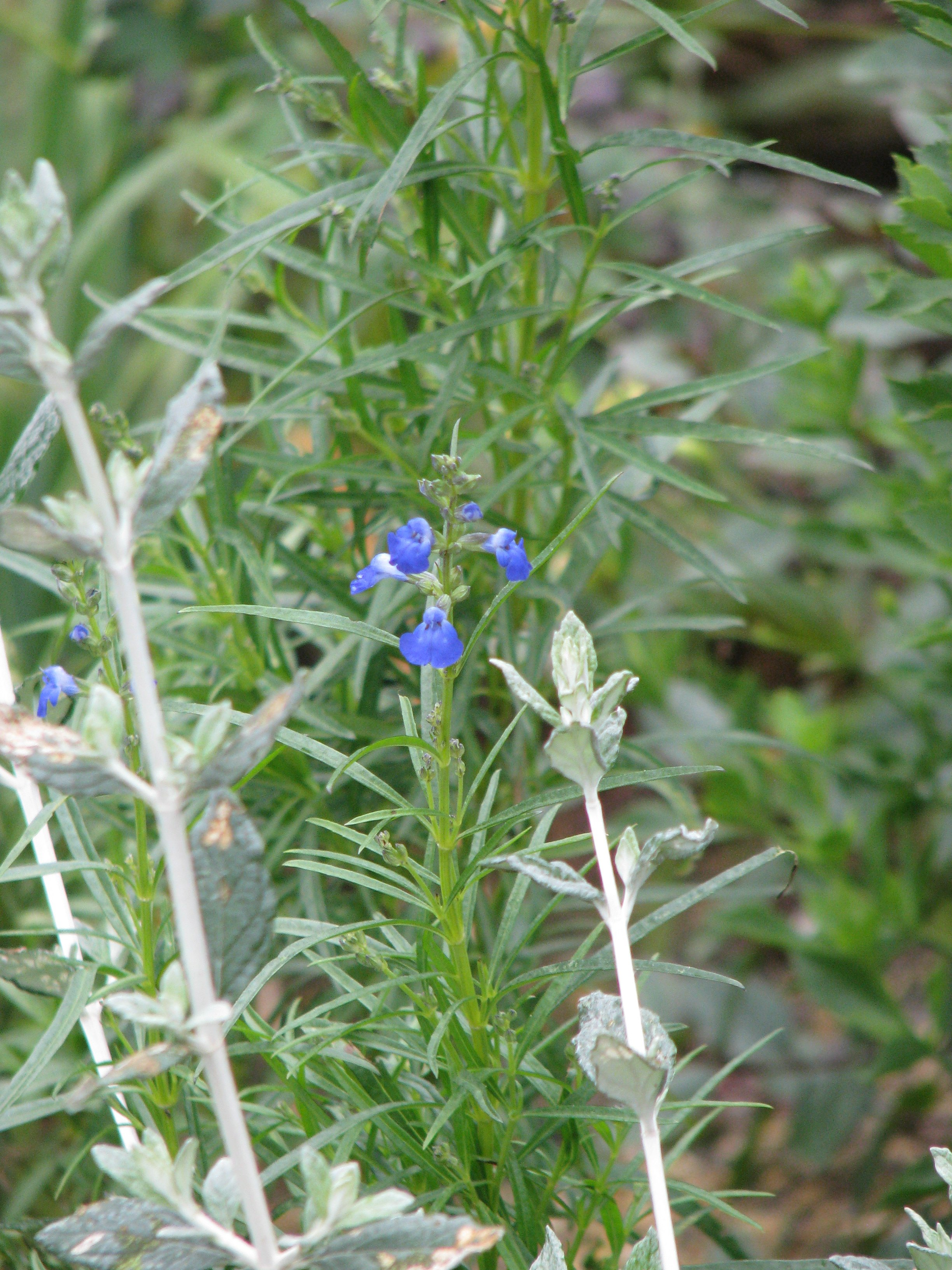

Scientific classification
- Kingdom: Plantae
- Clade: Tracheophytes
- Clade: Angiosperms
- Clade: Eudicots
- Clade: Asterids
- Order: Lamiales
- Family: Lamiaceae
- Genus: Salvia
- Species: S. reptans

Binomial name
- Salvia reptans Jacq.

Synonyms
- Salvia angustifolia Cav., nom. illeg.; Salvia leptophylla Benth.; Salvia linifolia M.Martens & Galeotti

= Salvia reptans =

Species of flowering plant

Salvia reptans is a widely distributed herbaceous perennial native to the mountains of the Trans-Pecos in Texas, and in Mexico and Guatemala. It typically grows in dry stream beds and gravelly soils. It was introduced into horticulture in the 19th century and was previously known by the synonyms Salvia angustifolia and Salvia leptophylla, both of which refer to the slender leaves. The specific epithet reptans refers to the plant's creeping habit.

The form of Salvia reptans commonly grown in gardens is unusual in that it produces numerous lax or decumbent stems. The other form, which is native to western Texas, grows upright to 3 feet in height. The variety S. reptans var. glabra also grows wild in Texas. In horticulture, Salvia reptans reaches 3 feet wide or more with abundant thin, black stems. The stems can make a groundcover. The narrow mistletoe-green leaves are sparse. The 0.5 inch flowers have blue corollas in dark calyces.
