= Saragosa, Texas =

Saragosa
- Town
- Location within the state of Texas Saragosa (the United States)
- Coordinates: 31°01′27″N 103°39′42″W
- Country: United States
- State: Texas
- County: Reeves
- Time zone: UTC-6 (Central (CST))
  - Summer (DST): UTC-5 (CDT)
- ZIP codes: 79780
- GNIS feature ID: 1367768

Saragosa is a small town in Reeves County, Texas, United States. According to the Handbook of Texas, the community had an estimated population of 185 in 2000.

Saragosa has a post office with the ZIP code 79780.

== Geography ==
Saragosa is situated at the junction of State Highway 17 and FM 1215, approximately two miles north of Interstate 10 in southeastern Reeves County.

== History ==
The community was first settled in 1880 when fifteen families established themselves along Toyah Creek. Antonio Matta built his horse ranch headquarters in the area. A post office opened in 1884, but closed in 1891. The post office was reestablished in 1900. In 1909, the plat for Saragosa was filed at the Reeves County courthouse. With the arrival of the Pecos Valley Southern Railway two years later, Saragosa became a shipping point for alfalfa, cotton, and fruits. By 1925, the community had a population of approximately 25. That number rose to 150 in 1931, but soon declined to around 25 in the mid-1930s. In 1938, Saragosa's school district consolidated with nearby Pecos. Throughout the 1940s, the community was home to four businesses and sixty residents. There were nine businesses in Saragosa at the end of the 1950s. The population peaked at around 380 in 1960. In 1968, Saragosa Elementary School closed and students were bussed to an elementary school in Pecos. The population stood at 173 in 1970 and rose slightly to 183 by the late 1980s, where it remained relatively stable during the remainder of the twentieth century.

=== 1987 tornado ===
On May 22, 1987, a multi-vortex, F4 tornado struck Saragosa. The half-mile wide tornado destroyed eighty percent of the community, killing 30 and injuring 121. The storm caused $1.5 million in damage. Most of Saragosa had been rebuilt by the early 1990s. The city had previously been hit by tornadoes in 1938 and 1964.

== Education ==
Public education in the community of Saragosa is provided by the Pecos-Barstow-Toyah Independent School District.
