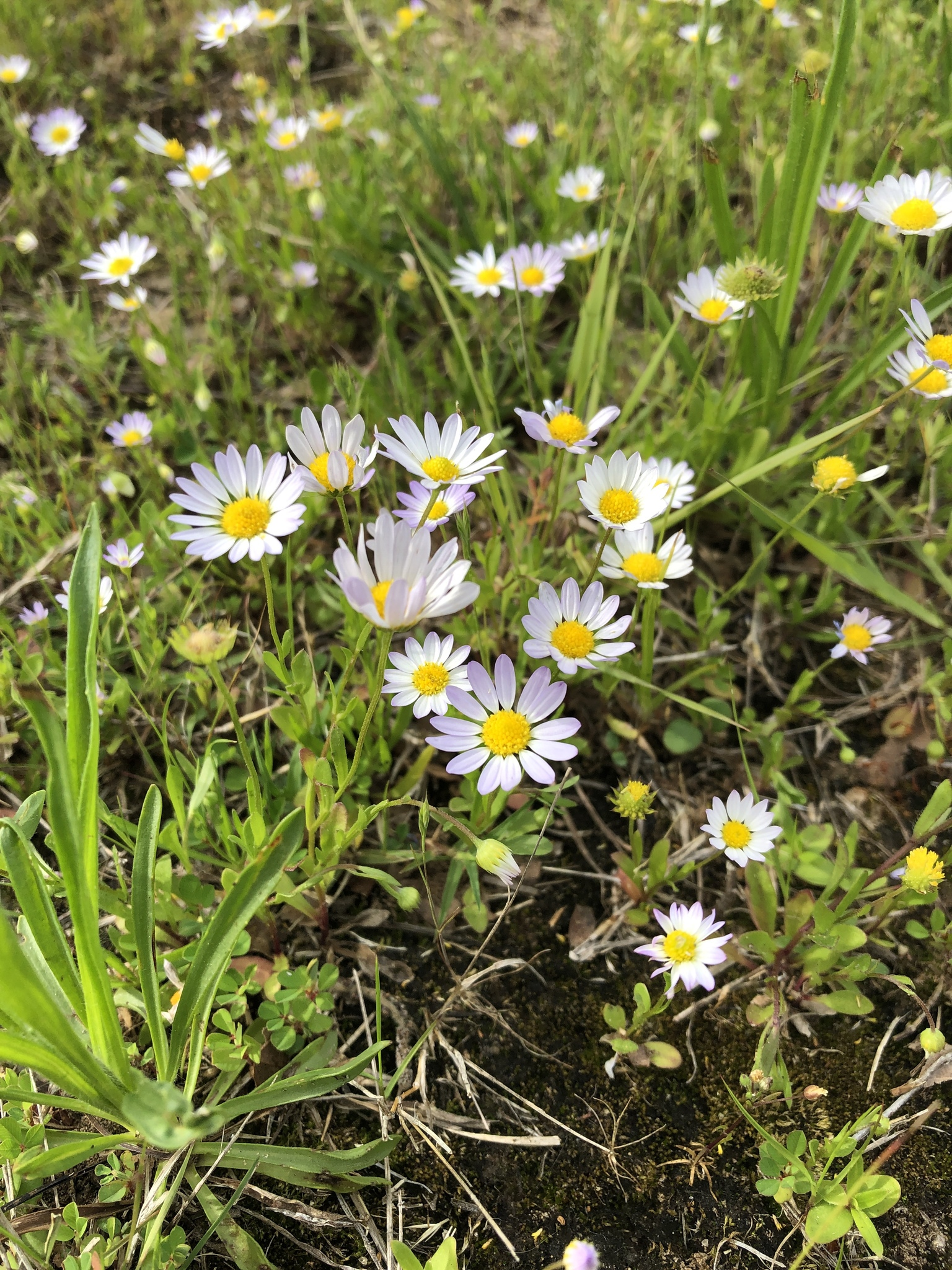

Scientific classification
- Kingdom: Plantae
- Clade: Tracheophytes
- Clade: Angiosperms
- Clade: Eudicots
- Clade: Asterids
- Order: Asterales
- Family: Asteraceae
- Genus: Astranthium
- Species: A. ciliatum

Binomial name
- Astranthium ciliatum (Raf.) G.L.Nesom

Synonyms
- Astranthium integrifolium subsp. ciliatum (Raf.) DeJong; Astranthium integrifolium var. ciliatum (Raf.) Larsen; Astranthium integrifolium var. rosulatum Larsen; Astranthium integrifolium var. triflorum (Raf.) Shinners; Bellis ciliata Raf.

= Astranthium ciliatum =

Species of flowering plant

Astranthium ciliatum, the Comanche western-daisy, is a North American species of flowering plants in the family Asteraceae. It is native to the southern part of the Great Plains of the central United States, with the range continuing southward into northeastern Mexico. It is found in the States of Nuevo León, Tamaulipas, Texas, Oklahoma, Arkansas, Missouri, and Kansas.

Astranthium ciliatum is an annual with a taproot, and usually an unbranched stem up to 50 cm (20 inches) tall. Flower heads have white or bluish ray florets and yellow disc florets.
