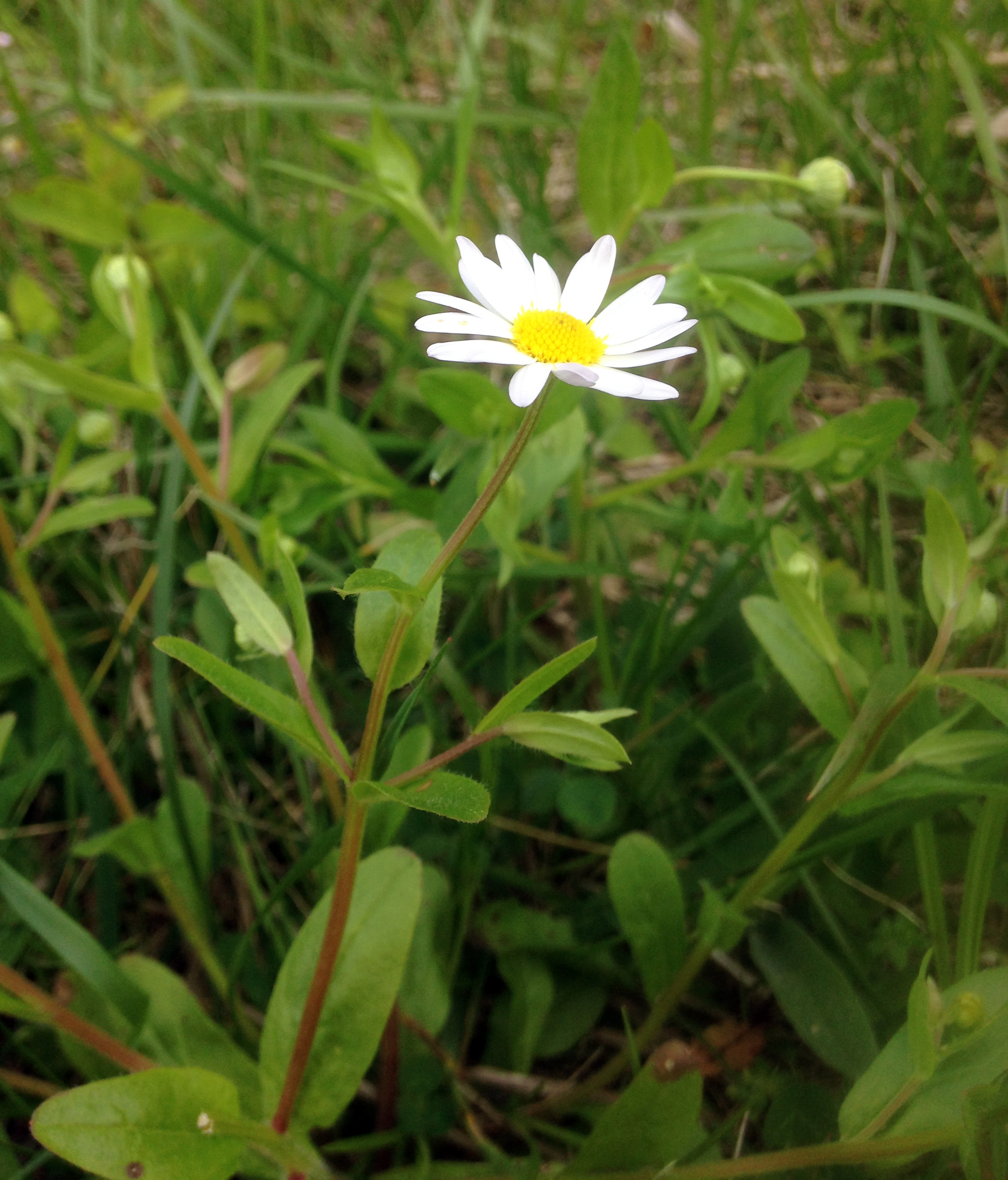

Scientific classification
- Kingdom: Plantae
- Clade: Tracheophytes
- Clade: Angiosperms
- Clade: Eudicots
- Clade: Asterids
- Order: Asterales
- Family: Asteraceae
- Genus: Astranthium
- Species: A. integrifolium

Binomial name
- Astranthium integrifolium (Michx.) Nutt.

Synonyms
- Bellis american] Mirb. ex Steud.; Bellis ciliata var. triflora Raf.; Bellis integrifolia Michx. 1803 not DC. 1786; Eclipta integrifolia (Michx.) Spreng.

= Astranthium integrifolium =

Species of flowering plant

Astranthium integrifolium, the entireleaf western daisy or eastern western-daisy, is a North American species of flowering plants in the family Asteraceae. It is native to the east-central part of the United States primarily the Cumberland Plateau and Ohio/Tennessee Valley. It is found in the States of Tennessee, Kentucky, Alabama, and Georgia, with isolated populations in Mississippi and West Virginia.

Astranthium integrifolium is an annual, usually with an unbranched stem up to 50 cm (20 inches) tall. Flower heads are usually borne one at a time, with white or bluish ray florets and yellow disc florets.

Its natural habitat is in limestone glades and barrens, and thin rocky woodlands.
