= San Solomon Springs =

Artesian springs in Reeves County, Texas, US

Coordinates: 30°56′39.36″N 103°47′18.09″W

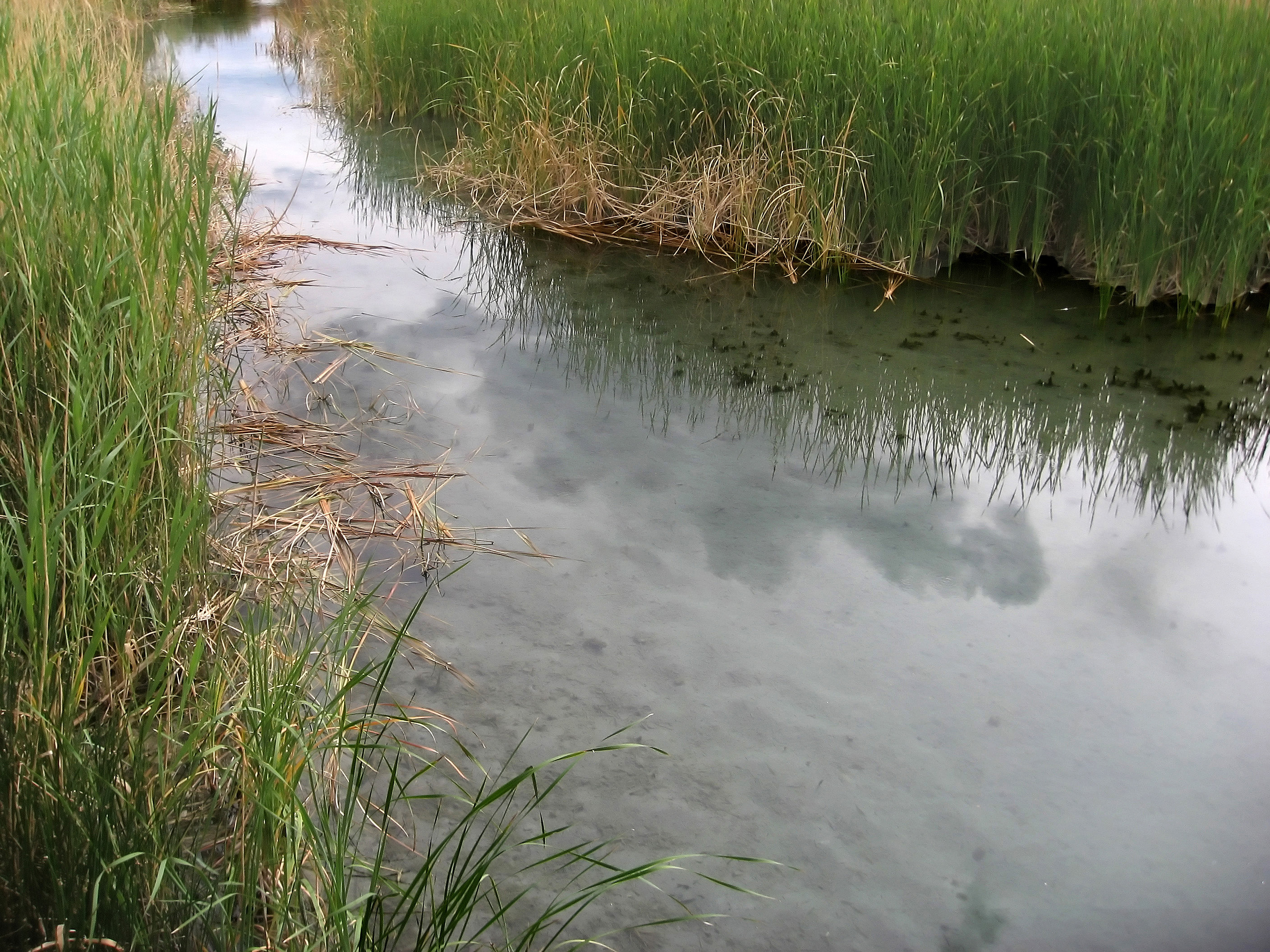
San Soloman Springs -- Marsh

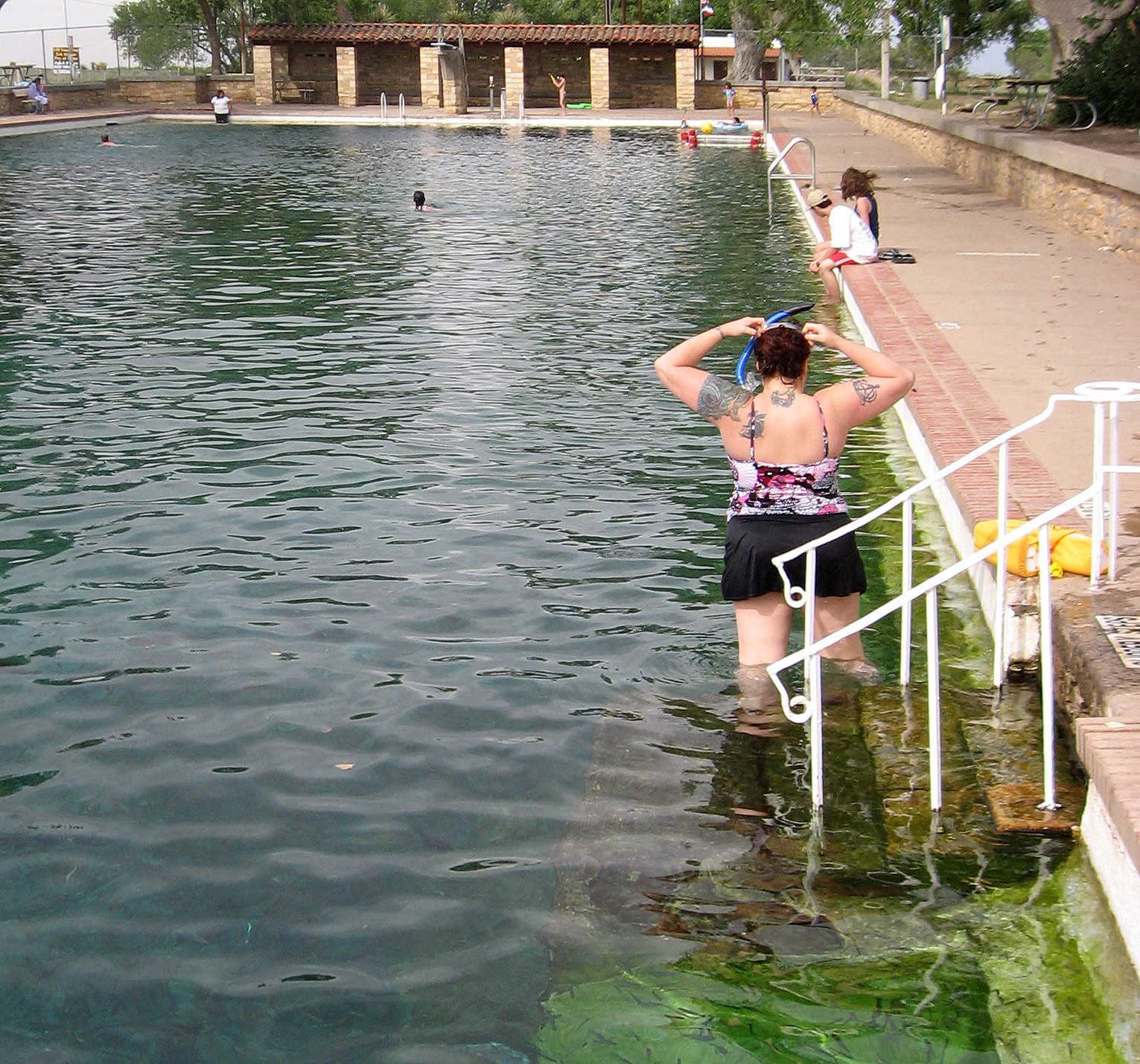
San Solomon Springs Swimming Pool

San Solomon Springs is a collection of artesian springs located near the small towns of Toyahvale and Balmorhea in Reeves County, Texas. Between 20 million and 28 million US gallons (90,850 cubic meters) of water a day flow from the springs, supplying water for a 1.75 acres (0.71 ha) swimming hole before flowing through a reconstructed marsh, all located within Balmorhea State Park. The springs line the sandy bottom of the central portion of the swimming hole, about 25 ft (7.6 m) beneath the water's surface. The pool is home to several species of fish and turtles, including the Texas spiny softshell turtle.
