= Toyahvale, Texas =

Unincorporated community in Texas, United States

Toyahvale
- Unincorporated community
- Location within the state of Texas Location within the United States
- Coordinates: 30°56′40″N 103°47′22″W
- Country: United States
- State: Texas
- County: Reeves
- Elevation: 3,323 ft (1,013 m)

Population (2000)
  - Total: approx. 60
- Time zone: UTC-6 (Central (CST))
  - Summer (DST): UTC-5 (CDT)
- ZIP codes: 79786
- GNIS feature ID: 1370067

Toyahvale is an unincorporated community in southern Reeves County, Texas, United States. It lies along State Highway 17 and FM 3078, south of the city of Pecos, the county seat of Reeves County.

== Description ==
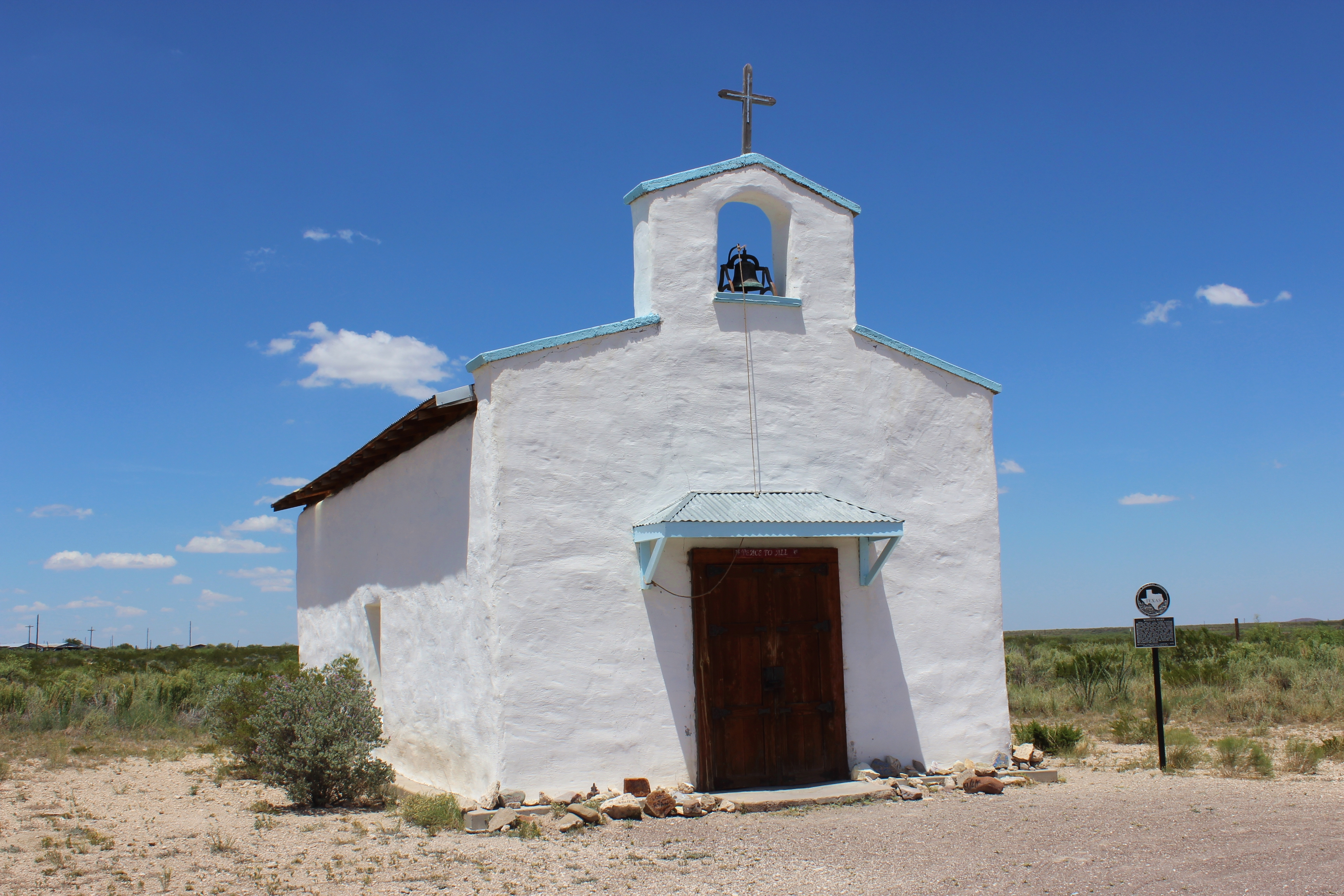
Mission Mary Calera Chapel (c. 1902), just outside Toyahvale, August 2015

Despite its similar name, Toyahvale is distinct from the town of Toyah, which lies 25 miles (40 km) to the north. Its elevation is 3,323 feet (1,013 m). Although Toyahvale is unincorporated, it has a post office, with the ZIP code of 79786.

Toyahvale reported a population of 25 in 1925 and 150 in 1926. In 1933, the population was back down to 25. Between 1950 and 1990, the population was reported as between 50 and 60 people and the latest numbers recorded a population of 60 in 2000.

Toyahvale's name is a portmanteau: its first half is of a local Indian word for "flowing water", combined with "vale". The community was established after 1884, but its first post office was not opened until 1894. It closed in 1931, but reopened in 1933. Toyahvale used to be the western terminus of the Pecos Valley Southern Railway until the line was trimmed back to Saragosa in 1971. It is also the location of Balmorhea State Park.

== Climate ==
According to the Köppen climate classification, Toyahvale has a semiarid climate, BSk on climate maps.
