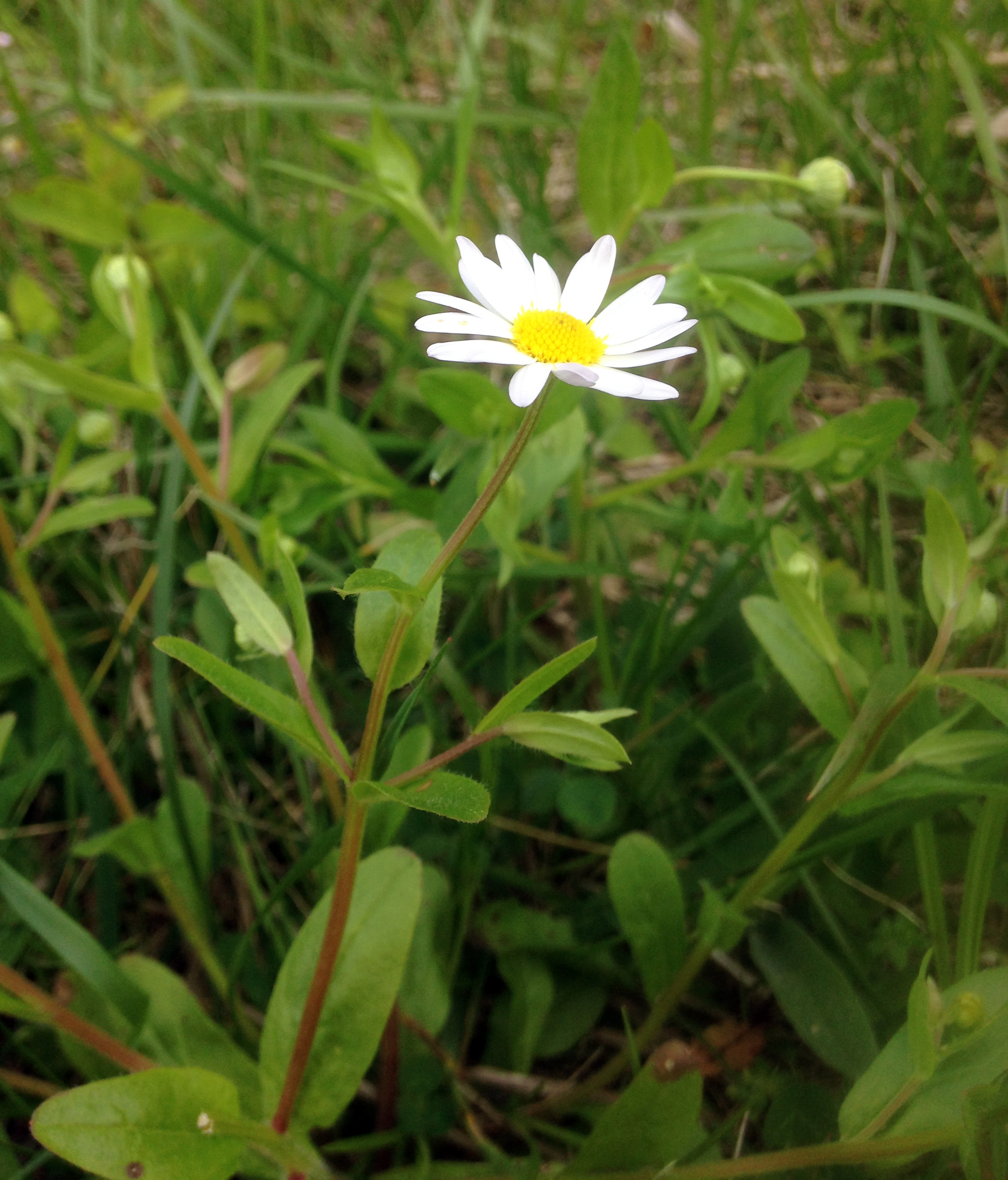
- Astranthium integrifolium in Kentucky

Scientific classification
- Kingdom: Plantae
- Clade: Embryophytes
- Clade: Tracheophytes
- Clade: Angiosperms
- Clade: Eudicots
- Clade: Asterids
- Order: Asterales
- Family: Asteraceae
- Subfamily: Asteroideae
- Tribe: Astereae
- Subtribe: Astranthiinae
- Genus: Astranthium; Nutt.

Type species
- Astranthium integrifolium (Michx.) Nutt.

= Astranthium =

Western-daisy

Genus of flowering plants

Astranthium, or Western-daisy, is a North American genus of flowering plants in the family Asteraceae. Astranthium is native to the United States and Mexico.

== Species ==
The genus includes the following species:

- Astranthium beamanii DeJong – Nuevo León
- Astranthium ciliatum (Raf.) G.L.Nesom – United States (Southern Plains: Texas Oklahoma Arkansas Kansas Missouri)
- Astranthium integrifolium (Michx.) Nutt. – United States: (Cumberland Plateau, Ohio/Tennessee Valley: Tennessee Kentucky Mississippi Alabama Georgia West Virginia)
- Astranthium laetificum DeJong - southern Mexico
- Astranthium mexicanum (A.Gray) Larsen – Oaxaca, D.F., Mexico State, Morelos, Hidalgo
- Astranthium orthopodum (B.L.Rob. & Fernald) Larsen – Chihuahua, Durango
- Astranthium purpurascens (B.L.Rob.) Larsen – Chiapas, San Luis Potosí
- Astranthium reichei Rzed. – central Mexico
- Astranthium robustum (Shinners) De Jong – United States (western Texas)
- Astranthium splendens DeJong – Nuevo León
- Astranthium xanthocomoides (Less.) Larsen – Hidalgo, Veracruz
- Astranthium xylopodum Larsen – Jalisco
