= Trans-Pecos =

Far west region in US state of Texas

- Region
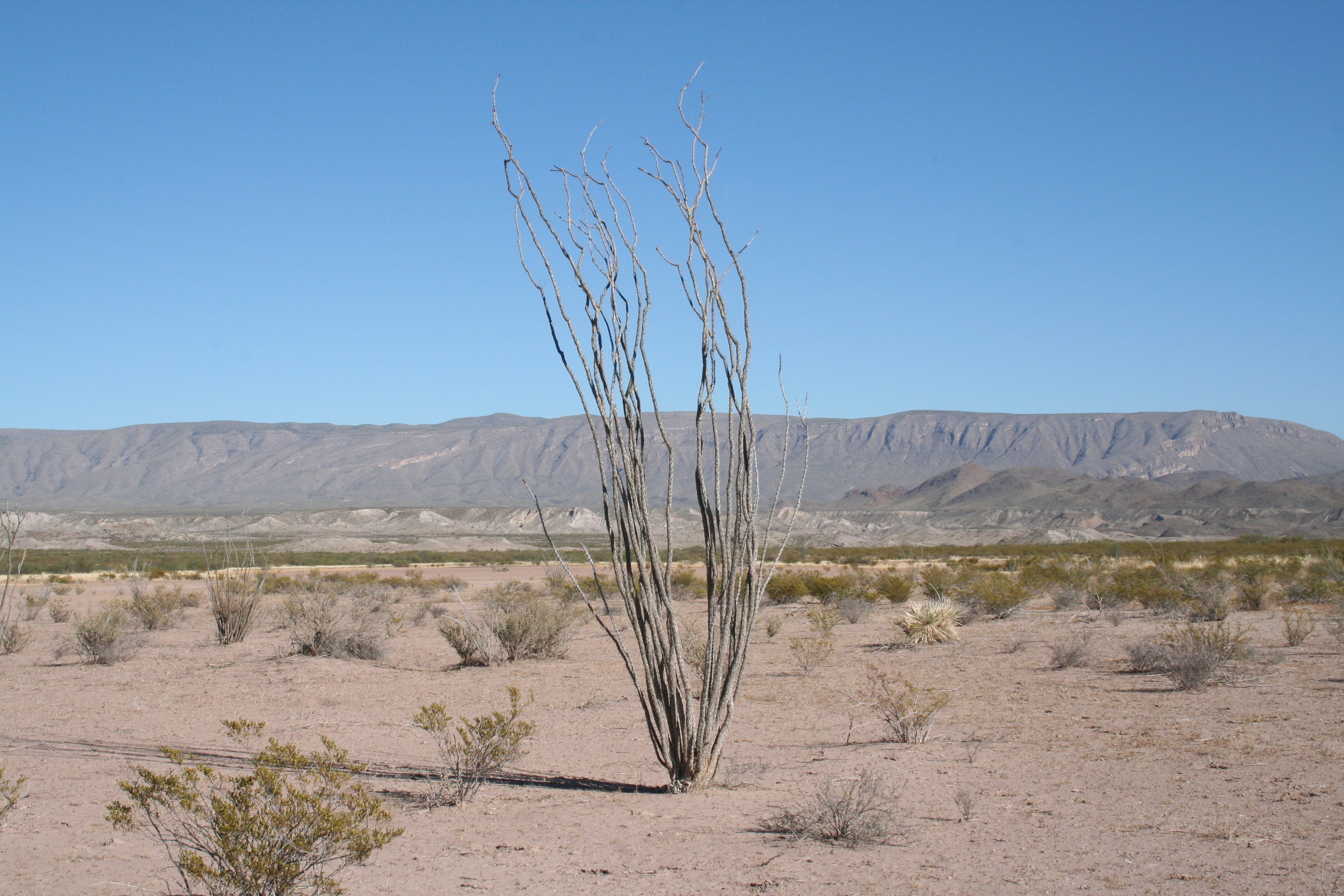
- Ocotillo in the Chihuahuan Desert of the Trans-Pecos

- Country: United States
- State: Texas
- Largest city: El Paso

Area
  - Land: 31,479 sq mi (81,530 km^{2})

Population (2020)
  - Total: 919,421

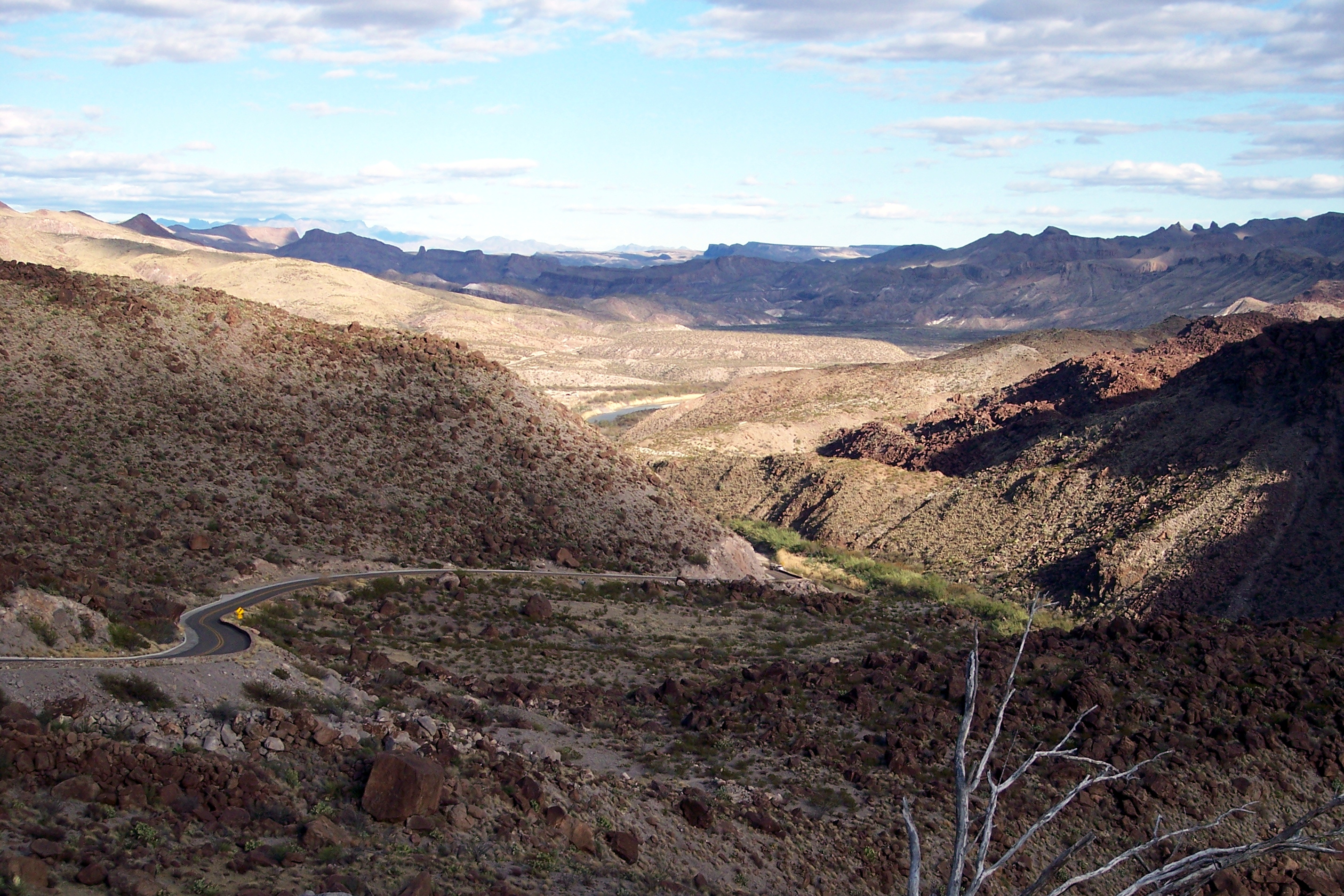
Rio Grande valley in the Big Bend area

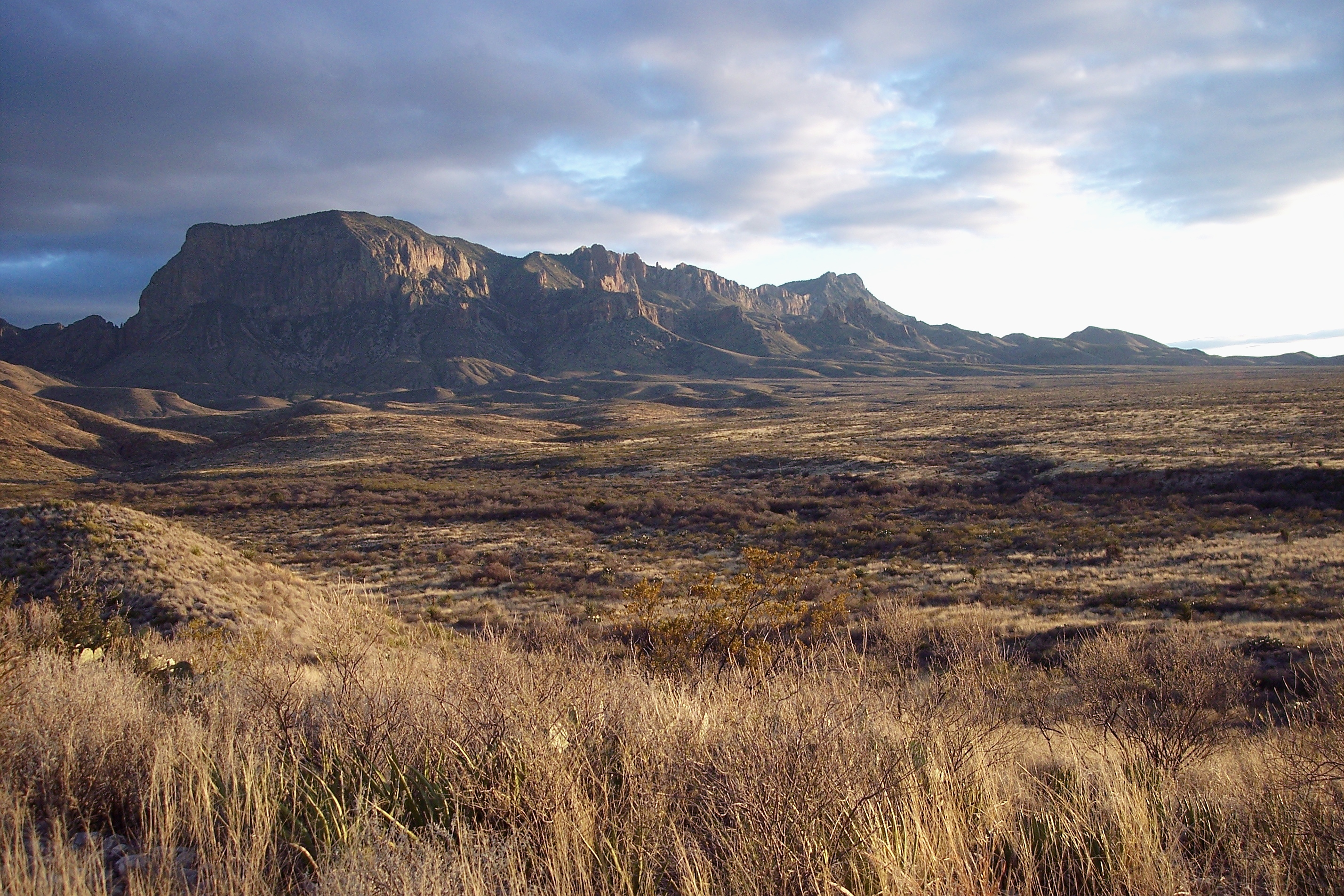
Big Bend National Park and Chihuahuan Desert

The Trans-Pecos, as originally defined in 1887 by the Texas geologist Robert T. Hill, is the distinct portion of Texas that lies west of the Pecos River. The term is considered synonymous with Far West Texas, a subdivision of West Texas. The Trans-Pecos is part of the Chihuahuan Desert, the largest desert in North America. It is the most mountainous and arid portion of the state, and most of its vast area (outside the city of El Paso) is sparsely populated. Among the nine counties in the region are the five largest counties by area in Texas and eight of the eleven largest in the state. The area is known for the natural environment of the Big Bend and the gorge of the Rio Grande, part of which has been designated a National Wild and Scenic Rivers System. With the notable exceptions of Big Bend Ranch State Park, Big Bend National Park and the Guadalupe Mountains National Park, the vast majority of the Trans-Pecos region consists of privately owned ranchland. However, most of the region's population resides in the El Paso metropolitan area. Besides El Paso and its metropolitan area, the major cities are Pecos (12,916), Fort Stockton (8,466), and Alpine (6,035). All other settlements have under 5,000 people.

== Demographics ==
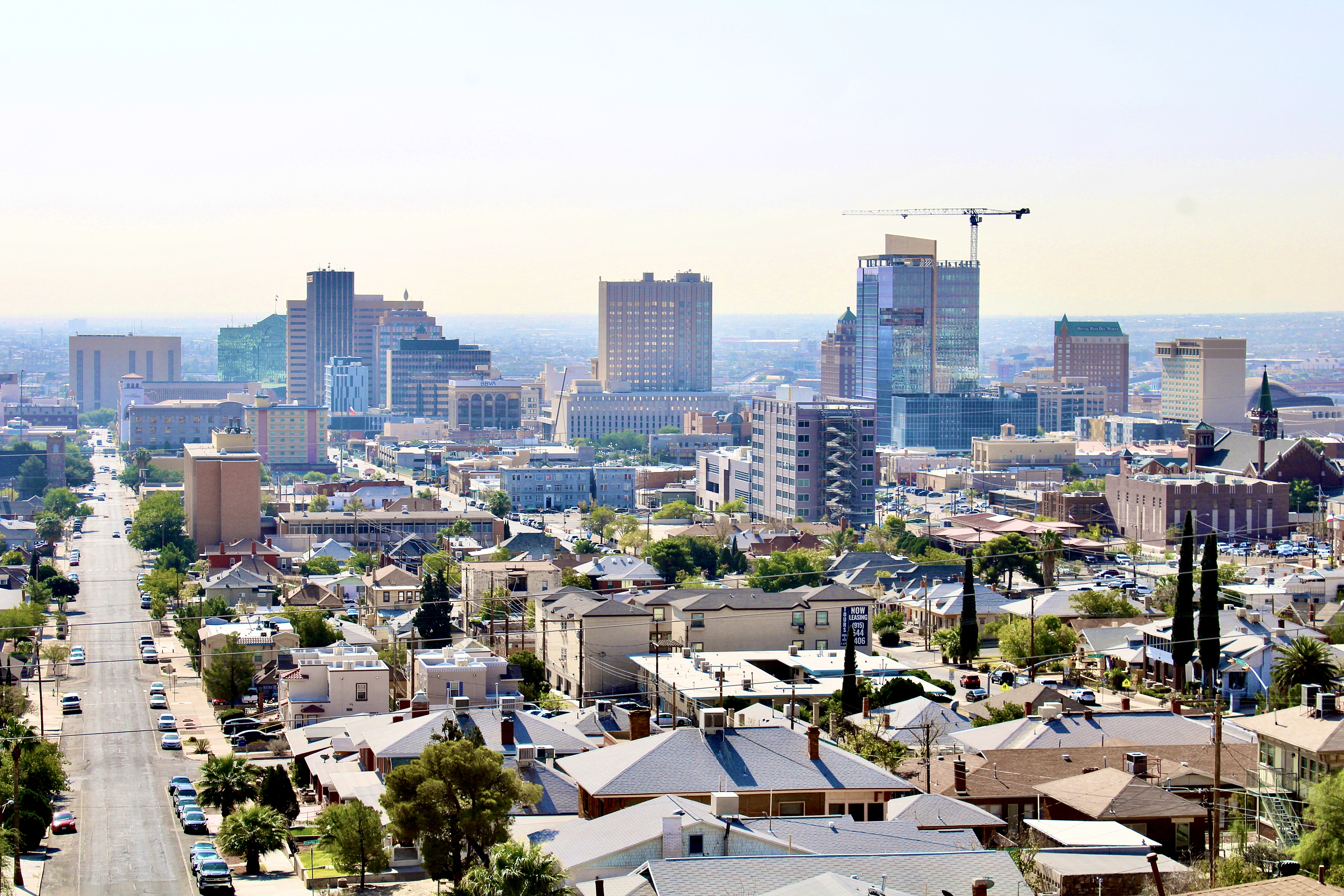
El Paso is the most populated city in the Trans-Pecos region.

The Trans-Pecos region consists of nine counties: Brewster, Culberson, El Paso, Hudspeth, Jeff Davis, Pecos, Presidio, Reeves, and Terrell. Brewster County, the largest, has a land area of 6,193 sq mi (16,040 km^{2}). The land area of Brewster County is about 10% larger than the state of Connecticut, yet it has a population density of only 1.5 persons per square mile compared to the 718 persons per square mile who reside in Connecticut (both as of 2020). Terrell County, which borders both the Pecos River and the Rio Grande, is the least-populated county in the Trans-Pecos region. According to the 2020 census, Terrell County had a total population of 760 residents occupying a land area of 2,358 sq mi (6,107 km^{2}), resulting in a population density of 0.32 persons per square mile.

The Trans-Pecos is a region of extremes, and at the opposite extreme from sparsely populated Terrell County is El Paso County, which is the smallest but most populated of the nine counties. El Paso County has a land area of only 1,015 sq mi (2,629 km^{2}), yet it has a population of 865,657 individuals (as of 2020), resulting in a population density of 853 persons per square mile, a value that exceeds that of Connecticut. El Paso County makes up 93.5 percent of the region's total population.

Overall, the total population of the Trans-Pecos amounts to 919,421 (as of 2020) residents occupying an area of 31,479 sq mi (81,530 km^{2}), resulting in a population density 29.5 persons per square mile (11.4 persons per km^{2}), less than a third of the population density of the state as a whole. If the Trans-Pecos were a state, it would rank 46th in population (more than South Dakota, less than Delaware), 40th in total area (larger than South Carolina, smaller than Maine), and 42nd in population density (higher than Nevada, lower than Kansas).

== Politics ==
Trans-Pecos Vote by Party in Presidential Elections
| Year | GOP | DEM | Others |
|---|---|---|---|
| 2024 | 43.1% 115,960 | 55.6% 143,156 | 1.29% 3,289 |
| 2020 | 33.6% 95,294 | 65.7% 186,053 | 0.67% 1,905 |
| 2016 | 27.4% 63,892 | 66.8% 155,729 | 5.75% 13,399 |
| 2012 | 27.3% 65,173 | 71.5% 170,816 | 1.22% 2,914 |
| 2008 | 34.6% 69,839 | 64.4% 129,907 | 1.01% 2,046 |
| 2004 | 44.0% 83,034 | 54.0% 102,086 | 1.99% 3,767 |
| 2000 | 40.9% 65,910 | 56.5% 91,131 | 2.66% 4,288 |
| 1996 | 32.6%49,176 | 61.5% 92,786 | 5.98% 9,025 |
| 1992 | 34.7% 52,943 | 49.9% 76,068 | 15.5% 23,593 |
| 1988 | 46.8%63,716 | 52.7% 71,817 | 0.52% 703 |
| 1984 | 56.0% 76,913 | 43.5% 59,720 | 0.40% 549 |
| 1980 | 53.6% 62,365 | 40.8% 47,509 | 5.63% 6,557 |
| 1976 | 47.45% 50,070 | 51.2% 54,036 | 1.34% 1,411 |
| 1972 | 60.9% 59,007 | 38.4% 37,184 | 0.75% 774 |
| 1968 | 43.4% 35,476 | 47.3% 38,692 | 9.32% 7,626 |
| 1964 | 36.8%25,403 | 62.9% 43,444 | 0.31% 212 |
| 1960 | 48.1% 30,664 | 51.6% 32,867 | 0.32% 202 |

The region as a whole has voted for the Democratic Party's presidential candidate in every election since 1988, including Joe Biden, who received 65.7 percent of the vote in 2020. This is in large part because of El Paso County, which also has been solidly Democratic since Ronald Reagan won the county in 1984. However, Presidio is the most consistently Democratic county in the Trans-Pecos, being like South Texas the longest-established Democratic stronghold in the nation.

Jeff Davis is the most Republican county in the region, last being won for the Democratic Party by Jimmy Carter in 1976, although even George W. Bush’s 66.79 percent of the vote in 2000 stands modest compared to the 90 percent or more Republican vote common in Panhandle counties since the turn of the millennium. Hudspeth, Pecos and Terrell Counties, last won for the Democrats by Bill Clinton in 1996, have become comparably Republican to Jeff Davis in the past couple of elections. The remaining three counties, especially Brewster County, have been “swing” counties since the 1970s, although Hillary Clinton consolidated Democratic majorities in Culberson and Reeves counties in 2016.

The city of El Paso and its environs form Texas's 16th congressional district, currently represented by Congressman Veronica Escobar (D-El Paso). The remainder of the region is located entirely within Texas's 23rd congressional district, formerly represented by Congressman Tony Gonzales (R-San Antonio).

In the Texas Senate, El Paso County forms a single district, Senate District 29, represented by José R. Rodríguez (D-El Paso), while the remainder of the region is included in Senate District 19, represented by Pete Flores (R-Pleasanton). In the Texas House of Representatives, El Paso County is divided between House Districts 75–79, while the remainder of the region is included in House District 74.

== Road transportation ==
Interstates 10 and 20 are the largest freeways in the Trans-Pecos region. Major federal highways include US Highway 90 and US Highway 67, which are partially cosigned; Highway 90 continues from Alpine east to Del Rio, while Highway 67 runs south from Marfa to the Mexico–United States border at Presidio/Ojinaga, after which it continues as Mexican Federal Highway 16. State Highway 17 begins in Pecos and traverses Balmorhea State Park before joining Route 67 in Marfa, while State Highway 118 begins shortly after the junction of Interstates 10 and 20 near Kent and continues south to Study Butte at the entrance of Big Bend National Park.

== Wine regions ==
The Trans-Pecos region contains three American Viticultural Areas: the Escondido Valley AVA, the Texas Davis Mountains AVA, and a portion of the Mesilla Valley AVA, most of which is in New Mexico.

== See also ==
- Balmorhea State Park
- Beach Mountains
- Big Bend National Park
- Big Bend Ranch State Park
- Chalk Mountains
- Davis Mountains
- Franklin Mountains State Park
- Guadalupe Mountains
- List of geographical regions in Texas
- McKittrick Canyon
