= Toyah, Texas =

Town in Reeves County, Texas, United States

- Town
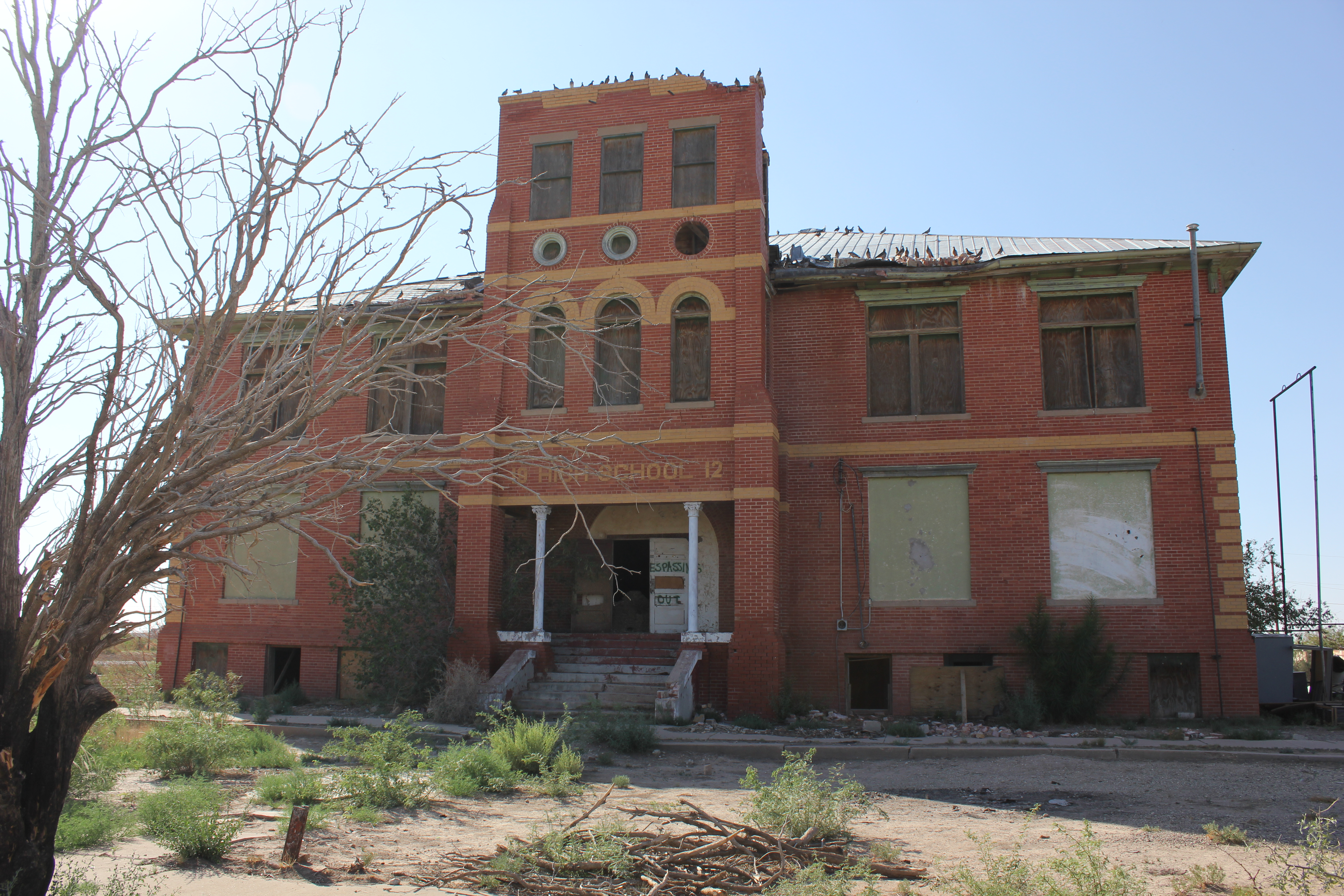
- Historic high school in Toyah, July 2014

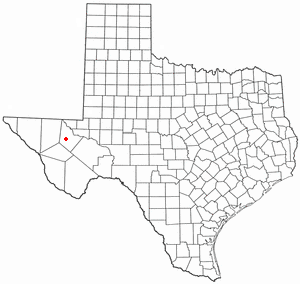
- Location of Toyah, Texas

- Coordinates: 31°18′48″N 103°47′35″W
- Country: United States
- State: Texas
- County: Reeves

Government
  - Mayor: Bobby Creamer

Area
  - Total: 1.62 sq mi (4.20 km^{2})
  - Land: 1.62 sq mi (4.20 km^{2})
  - Water: 0 sq mi (0.00 km^{2})
- Elevation: 2,913 ft (888 m)

Population (2020)
  - Total: 61
  - Density: 38/sq mi (15/km^{2})
- Time zone: UTC-6 (Central (CST))
  - Summer (DST): UTC-5 (CDT)
- ZIP code: 79785
- Area code: 432
- FIPS code: 48-73496
- GNIS feature ID: 1370063
- Website: toyahtx.com

Toyah is a town in Reeves County, Texas, United States. Its population was 61 at the 2020 census.

== History ==
On October 25, 1906, a black man in Toyah named J.I. "Slab" Pitts was dragged to death and then hanged for living with his white wife, Eva Ruff.

In September 1928, Amelia Earhart made an unscheduled five-day stop to adjust her carburetor. She relates in her journal that she landed in a small town near Pecos, Texas, but according to a regional book, The Toyah Taproots, several local, unnamed youngsters were seen in pictures around her airplane were later identified as being from Toyah.

In 2004, much of the town was destroyed by floods and a high wind event, damaging several homes, cars, and the cemetery, leaving much of the town deserted. The old bank building was left destroyed.

== Geography ==
According to the United States Census Bureau, the town has a total area of 1.6 square miles (4.1 km^{2}), all land.

== Demographics ==
Historical population
| Census | Pop. | Note | %± |
|---|---|---|---|
| 1910 | 1,052 | | — |
| 1930 | 553 | | — |
| 1940 | 464 | | −16.1% |
| 1950 | 409 | | −11.9% |
| 1960 | 294 | | −28.1% |
| 1970 | 245 | | −16.7% |
| 1980 | 165 | | −32.7% |
| 1990 | 115 | | −30.3% |
| 2000 | 100 | | −13.0% |
| 2010 | 90 | | −10.0% |
| 2020 | 61 | | −32.2% |
U.S. Decennial Census; 2020 Census

At the 2000 United States census, 100 people, 47 households, and 28 families lived in the town. The population density was 61.6 inhabitants per square mile (23.8/km^{2}). The 72 housing units had an average density of 44.3 per square mile (17.1/km^{2}). The racial makeup of the town was 84.0% White, 4.0% African American, 2.0% Native American, 4.0% from other races, and 6.0% from two or more races. Hispanic or Latino people of any race were 51.0%.

Of the 47 households, 14.9% had children under 18 living with them, 51.1% were married couples living together, 4.3% had a female householder with no husband present, and 38.3% were not families. About 36.2% of households were one person and 19.1% were one person 65 or older. The average household size was 2.13, and the average family size was 2.79.

The age distribution was 13.0% under 18, 8.0% from 18 to 24, 24.0% from 25 to 44, 27.0% from 45 to 64, and 28.0% were 65 or older. The median age was 48 years. For every 100 females, there were 138.1 males. For every 100 females 18 and over, there were 128.9 males.

The median household income was $16,500 and the median family income was $15,313. Males had a median income of $19,375 versus $11,250 for females. The per capita income for the town was $8,611. There were 47.8% of families and 52.9% of the population living below the poverty line, including 100.0% of under 18 and 22.2% of those over 64.

== Education ==
The Town of Toyah is served by the Pecos-Barstow-Toyah Independent School District.

== See also ==
- List of municipalities in Texas
