= Lindsay, Reeves County, Texas =

Lindsay, Texas
- Census-designated place
- Location of Lindsay, Texas
- Country: United States
- State: Texas
- County: Reeves

Area
  - Total: 1.0 sq mi (2.6 km^{2})
  - Land: 1.0 sq mi (2.6 km^{2})
  - Water: 0.0 sq mi (0 km^{2})

Population (2020)
  - Total: 452
  - Density: 450/sq mi (170/km^{2})
- Time zone: UTC-6 (Central (CST))
  - Summer (DST): UTC-5 (CDT)

Lindsay is a census-designated place (CDP) in Reeves County, Texas, United States. The population was 452 at the 2020 census.

== Geography ==
Lindsay is located at 31°22′5″N 103°32′12″W (31.368075, -103.536789).

According to the United States Census Bureau, the CDP has a total area of 1.0 square mile (2.7 km^{2}), all land.

== Demographics ==
Historical population
Census	Pop.	Note	%±
2000	394		—
2010	271		−31.2%
2020	452		66.8%
U.S. Decennial Census; 1850–1900 1910; 1920 1930 1940; 1950 1960 1970; 1980 1990 2000; 2010 2020

Lindsay first appeared as a census designated place in the 2000 U.S. census.

=== 2020 census ===
Lindsay CDP, Texas – Racial and ethnic composition Note: the US Census treats Hispanic/Latino as an ethnic category. This table excludes Latinos from the racial categories and assigns them to a separate category. Hispanics/Latinos may be of any race.
Race / Ethnicity (NH = Non-Hispanic)	Pop 2000	Pop 2010	Pop 2020	% 2000	% 2010	% 2020
White alone (NH)	29	27	8	7.36%	9.96%	1.77%
Black or African American alone (NH)	1	0	0	0.25%	0.00%	0.00%
Native American or Alaska Native alone (NH)	3	3	7	0.76%	1.11%	1.55%
Asian alone (NH)	0	0	1	0.00%	0.00%	0.22%
Native Hawaiian or Pacific Islander alone (NH)	0	0	0	0.00%	0.00%	0.00%
Other race alone (NH)	0	0	0	0.00%	0.00%	0.00%
Mixed race or Multiracial (NH)	0	0	1	0.00%	0.00%	0.22%
Hispanic or Latino (any race)	361	241	435	91.62%	88.93%	96.24%
Total	394	271	452	100.00%	100.00%	100.00%

As of the census of 2000, there were 394 people, 115 households, and 100 families residing in the CDP. The population density was 379.4 inhabitants per square mile (146.5/km^{2}). There were 126 housing units at an average density of 121.3 per square mile (46.8/km^{2}). The racial makeup of the CDP was 87.82% White, 0.25% African American, 0.76% Native American, 3.30% from other races, and 7.87% from two or more races. Hispanic or Latino of any race were 91.62% of the population.

There were 115 households, out of which 46.1% had children under the age of 18 living with them, 74.8% were married couples living together, 8.7% had a female householder with no husband present, and 13.0% were non-families. 12.2% of all households were made up of individuals, and 6.1% had someone living alone who was 65 years of age or older. The average household size was 3.43 and the average family size was 3.78.

In the CDP, the population was spread out, with 35.3% under the age of 18, 9.9% from 18 to 24, 26.1% from 25 to 44, 17.5% from 45 to 64, and 11.2% who were 65 years of age or older. The median age was 29 years. For every 100 females, there were 92.2 males. For every 100 females age 18 and over, there were 93.2 males.

The median income for a household in the CDP was $12,188, and the median income for a family was $18,897. Males had a median income of $23,906 versus $8,229 for females. The per capita income for the CDP was $5,142. About 41.6% of families and 43.0% of the population were below the poverty line, including 41.2% of those under age 18 and 51.1% of those age 65 or over.
