= Reeves County, Texas =

County in the United States

- County
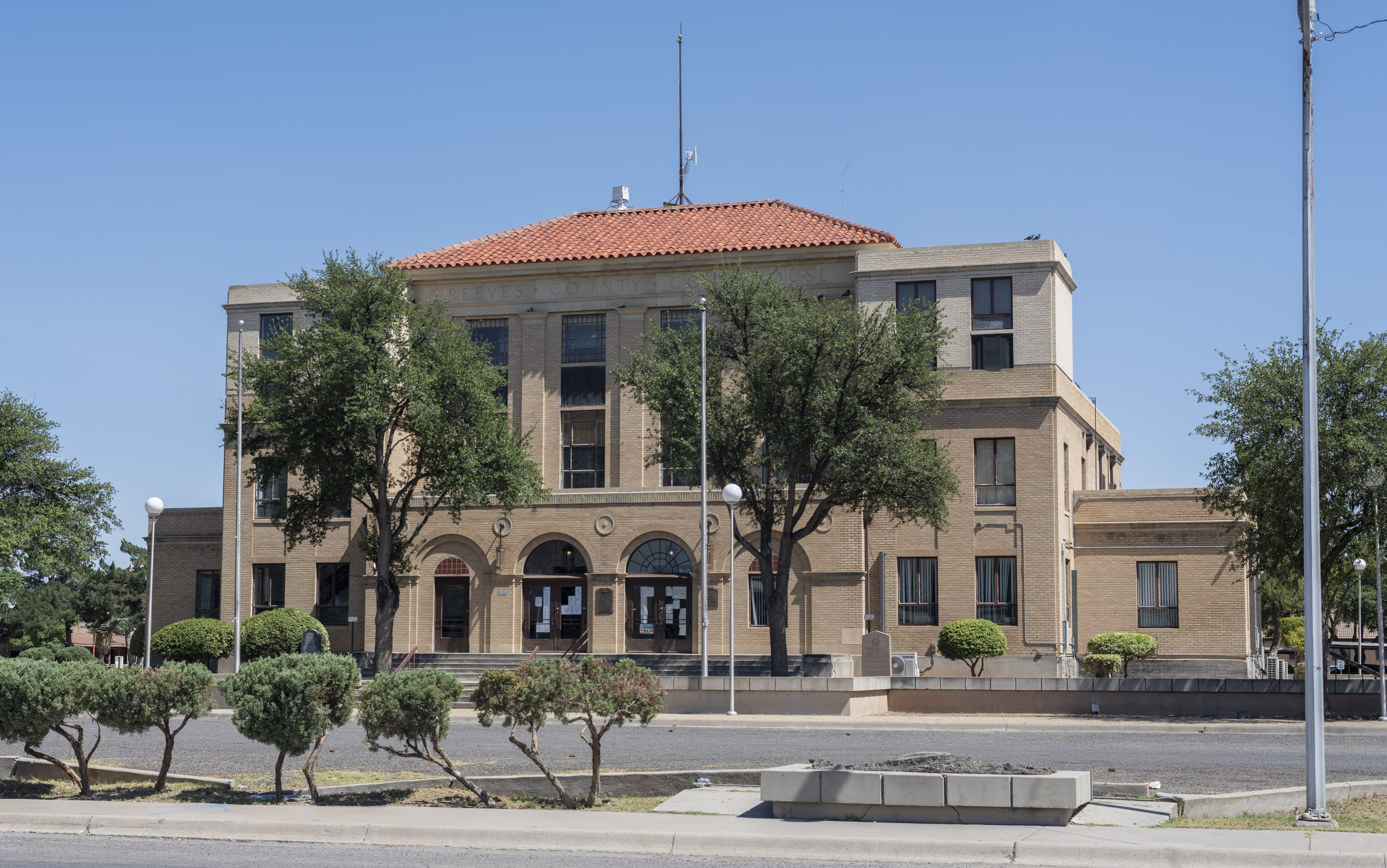
- Reeves County Courthouse in Pecos

- Location within the U.S. state of Texas
- Coordinates: 31°18′30.118″N 103°42′45.741″W
- Country: United States
- State: Texas
- Founded: April 14, 1883 (created); November 4, 1884 (organized)
- Named for: George R. Reeves
- Seat: Pecos
- Largest city: Pecos

Area
  - Total: 2,642.071 sq mi (6,842.93 km^{2})
  - Land: 2,635.354 sq mi (6,825.54 km^{2})
  - Water: 6.717 sq mi (17.40 km^{2}) 0.25%

Population (2020)
  - Total: 14,748
  - Estimate (2025): 12,138 ▼
  - Density: 4.537/sq mi (1.752/km^{2})
- Time zone: UTC−6 (Central)
  - Summer (DST): UTC−5 (CDT)
- Congressional district: 23rd
- Website: www.reevescounty.org

Reeves County is a county located in the U.S. state of Texas. As of the 2020 census, its population was 14,748. Its county seat and most populous city is Pecos. The county was created on April 14, 1883 and organized on November 4, 1884. It is named for George R. Reeves, a Texas state legislator and colonel in the Confederate Army. It is one of the nine counties that comprise the Trans-Pecos region of West Texas. Reeves County comprises the Pecos micropolitan statistical area.

== History ==
=== Native Americans ===
Prehistoric Clovis culture peoples in Reeves County lived in the rock shelters and caves nestled near water supplies. These people left behind artifacts and pictographs as evidence of their presence. Jumano Indians led the Antonio de Espejo 1582–1583 expedition near Toyah Lake on a better route to the farming and trade area of La Junta de los Ríos. Espejo's diary places the Jumano along the Pecos River and its tributaries. The Mescalero Apache frequented San Solomon Springs to irrigate their crops. In 1849, John Salmon "RIP" Ford explored the area between San Antonio and El Paso, noting in his mapped report the productive land upon which the Mescalero Indians farmed.

=== County established and growth ===
The state legislature formed Reeves from Pecos County on April 14, 1883, and named it after Texas legislator and soldier George Robertson Reeves. The county was organized on November 4, 1884. The town of Pecos was named as county seat.

Toyah Valley farmers George B. and Robert E. Lyle were the first Anglo settlers 1871. White settlers started arriving in the area four years later, lured by open-range ranching. For the remainder of the century, the county economy was dependent upon farming and ranching as it moved into the manufacturing and oil industries of the 20th century.

The Texas and Pacific Railway built through Reeves County in 1881, with stations at Pecos and Toyah. By 1890, the Pecos River Railway had built from Pecos to New Mexico. Toyahvale, which means "flowing water", became the western terminus of the railroad.

Balmorhea State Park was built at Toyahvale by the Civilian Conservation Corps. The park was deeded to the State of Texas in 1934 and opened to the public in 1968.

Pecos Army Air Field was one of the 120 airbases that trained the pioneer Women Airforce Service Pilots to fly military aircraft. At the Pecos installation, WASP flew AT-6, UC-78, and AT-17 aircraft in engineering tests, administrative duties, and transporting freight. The base was activated in 1942 as a World War II pilot school. The base was deactivated in 1945. At its peak, the base population of 4,034 rivaled the town of Pecos in size. Portions of the base were sold off over the years, with Pecos Municipal Airport retaining the remainder.

Pecos is the site of the largest private prison in the world, the Reeves County Detention Complex, operated by the GEO Group.

== Geography ==
According to the United States Census Bureau, the county has a total area of 2,642.071 square miles (6,842.93 km^{2}), of which 2,635.354 square miles (6,825.54 km^{2}) is land and 6.717 square miles (17.40 km^{2}) (0.25%) is water. It is the 9th largest county in Texas by total area.

=== Major highways ===
- Interstate 10
  - I-10 BL (Balmorhea)
- Interstate 20
  - I-20 BL (Pecos)
- U.S. Highway 285
- State Highway 17
- State Highway 302

=== Adjacent counties ===
- Eddy County, New Mexico (north/Mountain Time Zone)
- Loving County (northeast)
- Ward County (east)
- Pecos County (southeast)
- Jeff Davis County (south)
- Culberson County (west)

== Demographics ==
Historical population
Census	Pop.	Note	%±
1890	1,247		—
1900	1,847		48.1%
1910	4,392		137.8%
1920	4,457		1.5%
1930	6,407		43.8%
1940	8,006		25.0%
1950	11,745		46.7%
1960	17,644		50.2%
1970	16,526		−6.3%
1980	15,801		−4.4%
1990	15,852		0.3%
2000	13,137		−17.1%
2010	13,783		4.9%
2020	14,748		7.0%
2025 (est.)	12,138	▼	−17.7%
U.S. Decennial Census; 1790–1960 1900–1990; 1990–2000 2010–2020

As of the third quarter of 2024, the median home value in Reeves County was $117,940.

As of the 2023 American Community Survey, there are 4,145 estimated households in Reeves County with an average of 2.94 persons per household. The county has a median household income of $56,056. Approximately 17.6% of the county's population lives at or below the poverty line. Reeves County has an estimated 58.1% employment rate, with 6.9% of the population holding a bachelor's degree or higher and 71.3% holding a high school diploma.

=== 2020 census ===
As of the 2020 census, the county had a population of 14,748, 4,178 households, and 2,895 families residing in the county. The population density was 5.6 inhabitants per square mile (2.2/km^{2}), with 5,068 housing units at an average density of 1.92 per square mile (0.7/km^{2}).

The median age was 37.1 years. 21.2% of residents were under the age of 18 and 12.9% of residents were 65 years of age or older. For every 100 females there were 157.9 males, and for every 100 females age 18 and over there were 176.8 males age 18 and over.

The racial makeup of the county was 54.7% White, 2.0% Black or African American, 0.7% American Indian and Alaska Native, 1.1% Asian, <0.1% Native Hawaiian and Pacific Islander, 16.5% from some other race, and 25.0% from two or more races. Hispanic or Latino residents of any race comprised 84.8% of the population.

88.7% of residents lived in urban areas, while 11.3% lived in rural areas.

There were 4,178 households in the county, of which 37.3% had children under the age of 18 living in them. Of all households, 44.9% were married-couple households, 22.3% were households with a male householder and no spouse or partner present, and 27.0% were households with a female householder and no spouse or partner present. About 25.3% of all households were made up of individuals and 10.2% had someone living alone who was 65 years of age or older.

Of the 5,068 housing units, 17.6% were vacant. Among occupied housing units, 69.6% were owner-occupied and 30.4% were renter-occupied. The homeowner vacancy rate was 1.0% and the rental vacancy rate was 17.4%.

=== Racial and ethnic composition ===
Note: the US Census treats Hispanic/Latino as an ethnic category. This table excludes Latinos from the racial categories and assigns them to a separate category. Hispanics/Latinos may be of any race.

Race / ethnicity (NH = non-Hispanic)	Pop. 1980	Pop. 1990	Pop. 2000	Pop. 2010	Pop. 2020
White alone (NH)	5,561 (35.19%)	3,909 (24.66%)	3,131 (23.83%)	2,690 (19.52%)	1,697 (11.51%)
Black or African American alone (NH)	358 (2.27%)	340 (2.14%)	238 (1.81%)	672 (4.88%)	224 (1.52%)
Native American or Alaska Native alone (NH)	23 (0.15%)	26 (0.16%)	34 (0.26%)	21 (0.15%)	27 (0.18%)
Asian alone (NH)	33 (0.21%)	31 (0.20%)	46 (0.35%)	118 (0.86%)	165 (1.12%)
Pacific Islander alone (NH)	—	—	0 (0.00%)	2 (0.01%)	3 (0.02%)
Other race alone (NH)	36 (0.23%)	1 (0.01%)	3 (0.02%)	20 (0.15%)	39 (0.26%)
Mixed race or multiracial (NH)	—	—	45 (0.34%)	27 (0.20%)	83 (0.56%)
Hispanic or Latino (any race)	9,790 (61.96%)	11,545 (72.83%)	9,640 (73.38%)	10,233 (74.24%)	12,510 (84.83%)
Total	15,801 (100.00%)	15,852 (100.00%)	13,137 (100.00%)	13,783 (100.00%)	14,748 (100.00%)

=== 2010 census ===
As of the 2010 census, there were 13,783 people, 3,839 households, and _ families residing in the county. The population density was 5.2 inhabitants per square mile (2.0/km^{2}). There were 4,640 housing units at an average density of 1.76 per square mile (0.7/km^{2}). The racial makeup of the county was 77.23% White, 5.01% African American, 0.46% Native American, 0.86% Asian, 0.04% Pacific Islander, 14.85% from some other races and 1.54% from two or more races. Hispanic or Latino people of any race were 74.24% of the population.

== Communities ==
=== Cities ===
- Balmorhea
- Pecos (county seat)

=== Census-designated places ===
- Lindsay

=== Unincorporated communities ===
- Saragosa
- Toyahvale

=== Ghost town ===
- Orla

== Politics ==
In 2020, Donald Trump not only flipped Reeves County, but he won the greatest margin of victory for a Republican presidential candidate since Richard Nixon's 1972 re-election at 61.1%. In 2024, Trump expanded his vote share, winning 68% of the vote. As a result, Reeves County shifted to the right from 2012 to 2024 by 53 percentage points, representing one of the strongest such rightward shifts for any county in the country.

United States presidential election results for Reeves County, Texas
Year	Republican		Democratic		Third party(ies)	
Year	No.	%	No.	%	No.	%
1912	8	2.37%	278	82.49%	51	15.13%
1916	43	10.89%	346	87.59%	6	1.52%
1920	91	16.55%	457	83.09%	2	0.36%
1924	96	18.75%	387	75.59%	29	5.66%
1928	344	46.61%	394	53.39%	0	0.00%
1932	122	10.07%	1,085	89.60%	4	0.33%
1936	100	8.13%	1,127	91.63%	3	0.24%
1940	247	15.89%	1,305	83.98%	2	0.13%
1944	201	13.31%	1,157	76.62%	152	10.07%
1948	309	17.27%	1,383	77.31%	97	5.42%
1952	1,727	55.39%	1,385	44.42%	6	0.19%
1956	1,492	52.24%	1,356	47.48%	8	0.28%
1960	1,549	40.53%	2,235	58.48%	38	0.99%
1964	1,251	34.80%	2,340	65.09%	4	0.11%
1968	1,310	37.33%	1,456	41.49%	743	21.17%
1972	2,427	61.57%	1,510	38.31%	5	0.13%
1976	1,711	39.41%	2,613	60.18%	18	0.41%
1980	2,315	50.95%	2,138	47.05%	91	2.00%
1984	2,461	50.51%	2,396	49.18%	15	0.31%
1988	1,724	37.86%	2,812	61.75%	18	0.40%
1992	1,244	27.30%	2,569	56.37%	744	16.33%
1996	1,007	28.40%	2,279	64.27%	260	7.33%
2000	1,273	40.08%	1,872	58.94%	31	0.98%
2004	1,777	52.34%	1,600	47.13%	18	0.53%
2008	1,445	46.96%	1,606	52.19%	26	0.84%
2012	1,188	41.29%	1,655	57.53%	34	1.18%
2016	1,417	44.50%	1,659	52.10%	108	3.39%
2020	2,254	61.07%	1,395	37.79%	42	1.14%
2024	2,340	68.04%	1,070	31.11%	29	0.84%

United States Senate election results for Reeves County, Texas1
Year	Republican		Democratic		Third party(ies)	
Year	No.	%	No.	%	No.	%
2024	2,034	61.86%	1,142	34.73%	112	3.41%

United States Senate election results for Reeves County, Texas2
Year	Republican		Democratic		Third party(ies)	
Year	No.	%	No.	%	No.	%
2020	1,983	57.71%	1,337	38.91%	116	3.38%

Texas Gubernatorial election results for Reeves County
Year	Republican		Democratic		Third party(ies)	
Year	No.	%	No.	%	No.	%
2022	1,341	61.57%	801	36.78%	36	1.65%

== Education ==
Two school districts serve sections of the county:

- Balmorhea Independent School District
- Pecos-Barstow-Toyah Independent School District

All of the county is in the service area of Odessa College.

== See also ==
- List of museums in West Texas
- Recorded Texas Historic Landmarks in Reeves County
