= Balmorhea State Park =

State park in Texas, United States

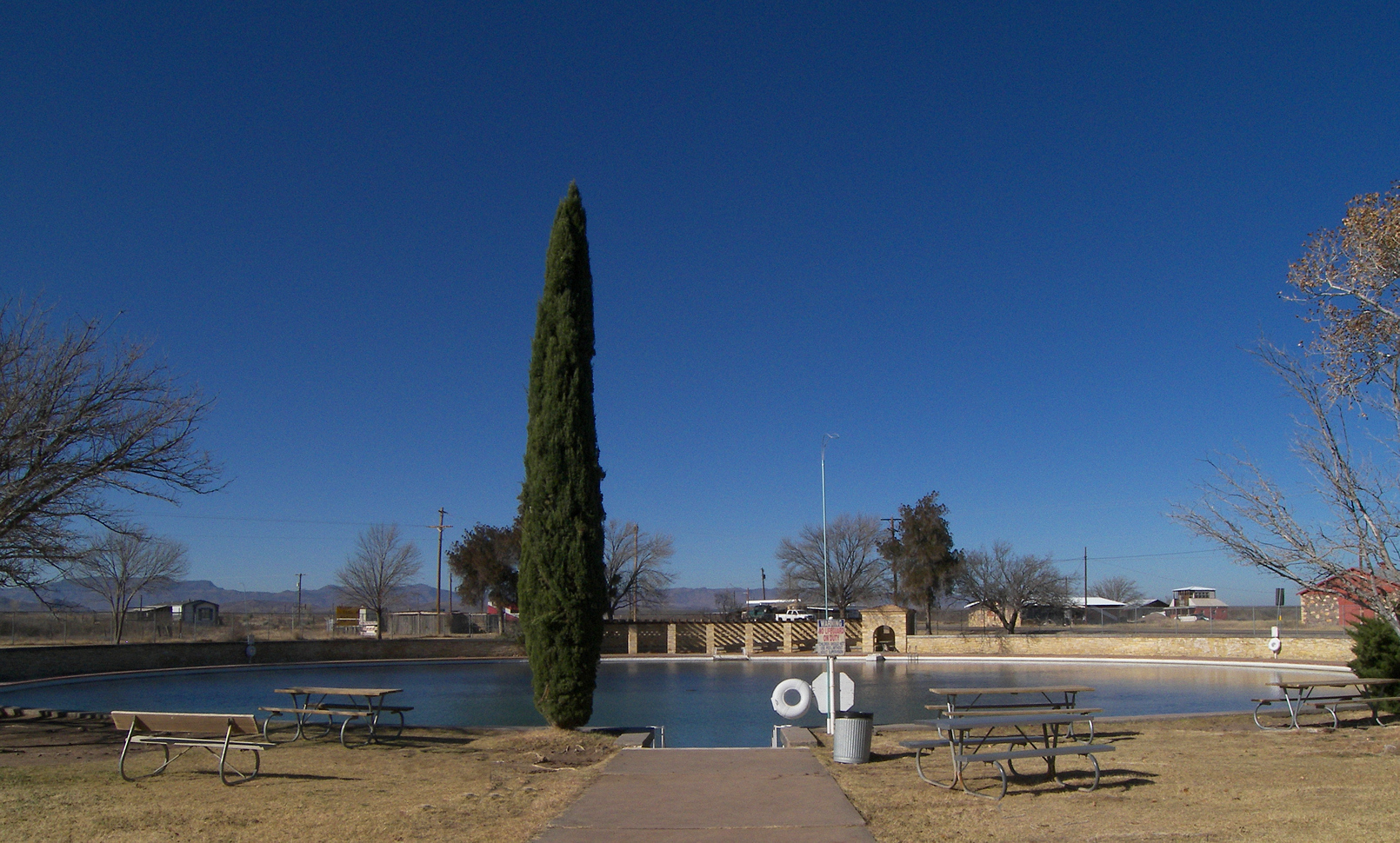
- The pool area at Balmorhea State Park

- Location within Texas Location within the United States
- Location: Reeves County, Texas, United States
- Nearest city: Balmorhea
- Coordinates: 30°56′40″N 103°47′07″W
- Area: 46 acres (19 ha)
- Established: 1968
- Visitors: 127,865 (in 2025)
- Governing body: Texas Parks and Wildlife Department
- Website: Official site

Balmorhea State Park is a 46-acre (19 ha) state park located on the San Solomon Springs in Reeves County, Texas, opened in 1968. The closest city is Balmorhea, Texas. Texas Parks and Wildlife Department manages the park. The park is best known for its large spring-fed swimming pool. The park is open year-round, and visitation is capped at 900 people per day.

== Features ==
The main feature of the park is the 1.3-acre (0.53 ha), 3.5-million-US-gallon (13,000 m^{3}) freshwater pool built around the springs. It is the world’s largest spring-fed swimming pool. The spring has a constant flow of 22 to 28 million US gallons (110,000 m^{3}) a day so no chlorination is required. The water temperature ranges from 72 to 76 °F (22 to 24 °C) and is up to 30 feet (9.1 m) deep. The pool bottom is flat in the more shallow areas and has a more natural rock bottom in the deeper areas. The pool is used for swimming, snorkeling, and scuba diving.

== History ==
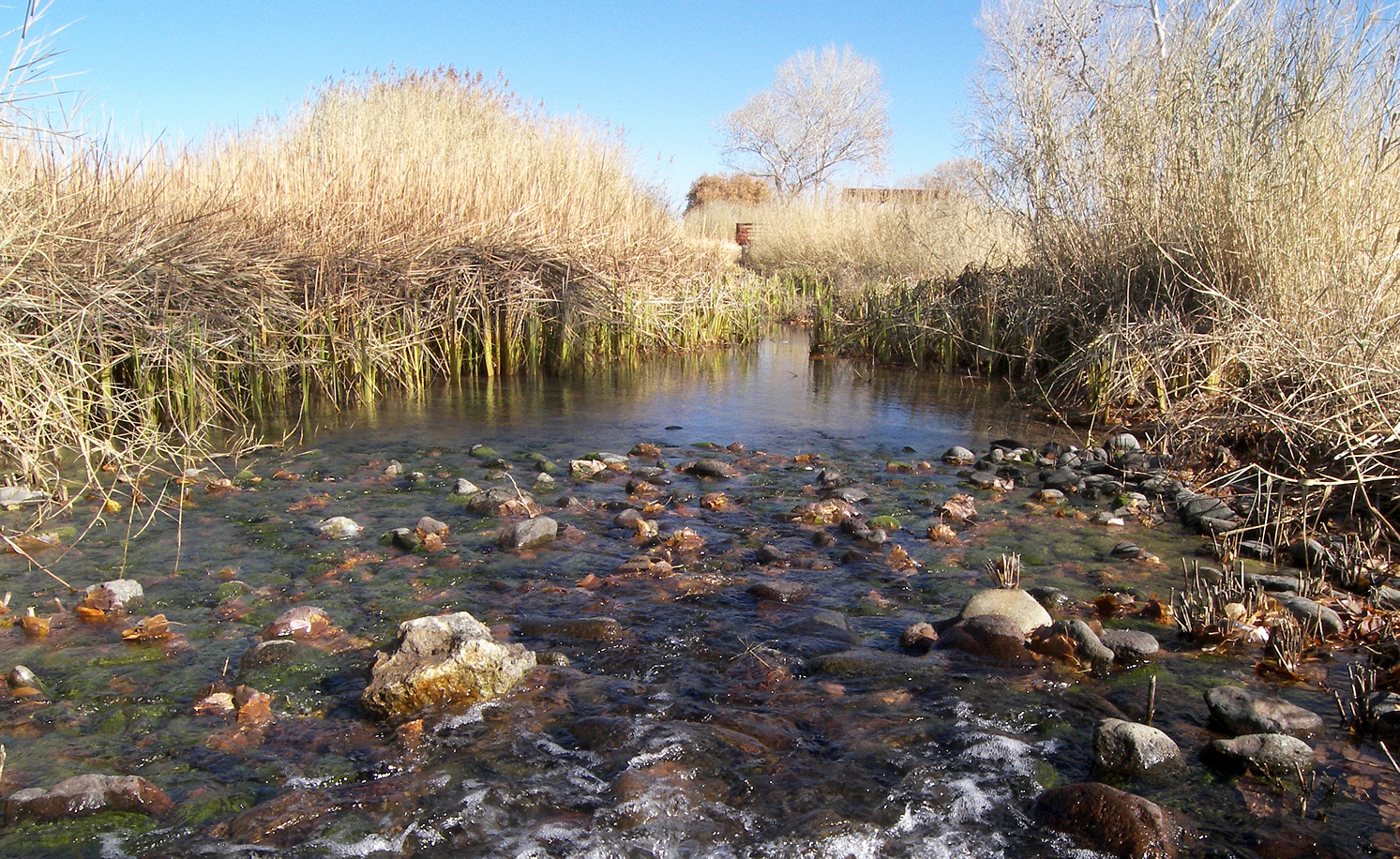
The restored cienega at Balmorhea State Park

The Texas State Parks Board bought San Solomon Springs and the surrounding land in 1934. Company 1856 of the Civilian Conservation Corps (CCC) built the pool between 1934 and 1941 as part of the New Deal during the Great Depression as a way to open up jobs for people needing work. The CCC also built the bathhouse, residences and the San Solomon Springs Courts motel units, which rents rooms for overnight stays. Camping and recreational vehicle sites are also available. A private concessionaire operated the facility until 1968, when the Parks and Wildlife Department took over management, and it became part of the state parks system.

The Balmorhea State Park Cienega Project, started in 1995, recreating a desert wetland in the park. The original cienega was lost when the CCC channeled water from the springs into the pool. The cienega now serves as a habitat for endangered fish such as the Comanche Springs pupfish and Pecos gambusia (also known as the Pecos mosquito fish) as well as other aquatic life, birds and other animals.

In early 2018, a wall in the pool around the diving board collapsed, and the pool was shut down. Houston-based Apache Corporation pledged to match all donations made to repair the pool up to one million dollars. The goal was reached in about four months. Sixty percent of the donations were under $100, however, other Texas companies made significant contributions, including Saulsbury Industries, Texas Pacific Land Trust, McCoy Remme Ranches, Legend Energy Services, Pioneer Energy Services and Garrison Brothers Distillery. Apache Corporation also established a one million dollar endowment fund for the park.

The pool reopened March 1, 2019 after repairs to the pool were completed. Only day-use facilities were available while the renovation of San Solomon Courts and campgrounds were still under way.

Texas Parks and Wildlife Department shut the park again on September 3, 2019 to repair the park's failing septic system and again in January 2021 for further repairs "for the foreseeable future." The park partially reopened in June 2021 with the swimming area reopening.

Texas Parks and Wildlife Department purchased an additional 643 acres of land for the park in 2020, including a former CCC section of the park, Carpenter's hill. The department also noted that it would be "some time" before that new acreage was opened up.

The campgrounds reopened in May 2024, and the San Solomon Courts in August 2024, leading the whole state park to be operational as of 2026.

== See also ==
- List of Texas state parks
