= List of Texas UIL State Marching Band Competition Winners =

The following is a list of Texas University Interscholastic League State Marching Band Competition winners.

Year	Conference 1A	Conference 2A	Conference 3A	Conference 4A	Conference 5A	Conference 6A	Governor's Cup	Source
1979–1980	Southlake Carroll	Medina Valley	Fredericksburg	Round Rock	No competition	Not applicable	No award	
1980–1981	Iraan	Howe	Medina Valley	Georgetown	Crockett (Austin)	Not applicable	No award	
1981–1982	Iraan	Southlake Carroll	Robinson	Georgetown	Crockett (Austin)	Not applicable	No award	
1982–1983	Johnson City LBJ	Clint	Medina Valley	Georgetown	Permian	Not applicable	No award	
1983–1984	Iraan	Henrietta	Hondo	Georgetown	Nixon	Not applicable	Georgetown	
1984–1985	Asherton	Dripping Springs	Robinson	Georgetown	MacArthur (San Antonio)	Not applicable	MacArthur (San Antonio)	
1985–1986	Asherton	Dripping Springs	Denver City	Georgetown	MacArthur (San Antonio)	Not applicable	DeSoto	
1986–1987	Nueces Canyon	Iraan	Denver City	Dickinson	Duncanville	Not applicable	Westfield	
1987–1988	Sundown	Iraan	Pearsall	Allen	Westfield	Not applicable	Cleburne	
1988–1989	Sundown	Olney	Denver City	Allen	Westfield	Not applicable	Westfield	
1989–1990	Sundown	Johnson City LBJ	Denver City	Dickinson	Westfield	Not applicable	No award	
1990–1991	Sudan	Iraan	Brownfield	Dickinson	Duncanville	Not applicable	No award	
1991–1992	Plains	Iraan	No competition	Dickinson	No competition	Not applicable	No award	
1992–1993	No competition		Brownfield	No competition	Spring	Not applicable	No award	
1993–1994	Irion County	Holliday	No competition	Dickinson	No competition	Not applicable	No award	
1994–1995	No competition		Robinson	No competition	Spring	Not applicable	No award	
1995–1996	Plains	Howe	No competition	Belton	No competition	Not applicable	No award	
1996–1997	No competition		Robinson	No competition	Westfield	Not applicable	No award	
1997–1998	Jayton	Howe	No competition	Mesquite Poteet	No competition	Not applicable	No award	
1998–1999	No competition		Hidalgo	No competition	Westfield	Not applicable	No award	
1999–2000	Jayton	Holliday	No competition	Coppell	No competition	Not applicable	No award	
2000–2001	No competition		Hidalgo / Robinson	No competition	L.D. Bell	Not applicable	No award	
2001–2002	Overton	Holliday	No competition	Cedar Park	No competition	Not applicable	No award	
2002–2003	No competition		Canton	No competition	Duncanville	Not applicable	No award	
2003–2004	Sundown / Throckmorton	Argyle	No competition	Richland	No competition	Not applicable	No award	
2004–2005	No competition		Canton	No competition	L.D. Bell	Not applicable	No award	
2005–2006	Sundown	Argyle	No competition	Mesquite Poteet	No competition	Not applicable	No award	
2006–2007	No competition		Canton	No competition	Marcus	Not applicable	No award	
2007–2008	Forsan	Queen City	No competition	Mesquite Poteet	No competition	Not applicable	No award	
2008–2009	No competition		Argyle	No competition	Marcus	Not applicable	No award	
2009–2010	Sundown	Queen City	No competition	Dripping Springs	No competition	Not applicable	No award	
2010–2011	No competition		Argyle	No competition	Marcus	Not applicable	No award	
2011–2012	Sundown	Queen City	No competition	Cedar Park	No competition	Not applicable	No award	
2012–2013	No competition		Argyle	No competition	Marcus	Not applicable	No award	
2013–2014	Shiner	Whitesboro	No competition	Vandegrift	No competition	Not applicable	No award	
2014–2015	No competition			Argyle	No competition	Marcus	No award	
2015–2016	Ropes	New Deal	Whitesboro	No competition	Cedar Park	No competition	No award	
2016–2017	No competition			North Lamar	No competition	Flower Mound	No award	
2017–2018	Whiteface	Clarksville	Mineola	No competition	Cedar Park	No competition	No award	
2018–2019	No competition	Valley Mills	No competition	Canton	No competition	Vista Ridge	No award	
2019–2020	Irion County	No competition	Mineola	No competition	Cedar Park	No competition	No award	
2020–2021	No competition	Thorndale	No competition	Argyle	No competition	Claudia Taylor Johnson	No award	
2021-2022	Menard	Sundown	Mineola	Argyle	Cedar Park	Hebron	No award	
2022-2023	No competition	Shiner	No competition	Celina	No competition	Vandegrift	No award	
2023-2024	Menard	Shiner	Whitesboro	Celina	Cedar Park	Vandegrift	No award	
2024-2025	Irion County	Sundown	Mineola	Celina	Cedar Park	Hebron	No award	
2025-2026	Cross Plains	Rivercrest	Mineola	Celina	Cedar Park	Flower Mound	No award	
2026-2027	Menard	Rivercrest	Mineola	Davenport	Argyle	Flower Mound	No award	

The following is a list of Texas University Interscholastic League State Military Marching Band Competition winners. The State Military Marching band contest was established in 2020 and separated from the open class competition to preserve the traditional military marching band style and stop its extinction.

Year	Conference 1A/2A	Conference 3A	Conference 4A	Conference 5A/6A	Source
2020-2021	Carlisle	No competition	Lindale	No competition	
2021-2022	Carlisle	White Oak	Lindale	Lufkin	
2022-2023	Carlisle	No competition	Lindale	No competition	
2023-2024	Carlisle	New Diana (tied for first with White Oak, judges chose New Diana)	Lindale	Lufkin	
2024-2025	Carlisle	White Oak	Lindale	Lufkin	
2025-2026	Beckville	West Rusk	Gilmer	Cleveland (tied for first with Longview, judges chose Cleveland)	
2026-2027	Carlisle	West Rusk	Lindale	Cleveland	
