= Bud McFadin =

American football player (1928–2006)

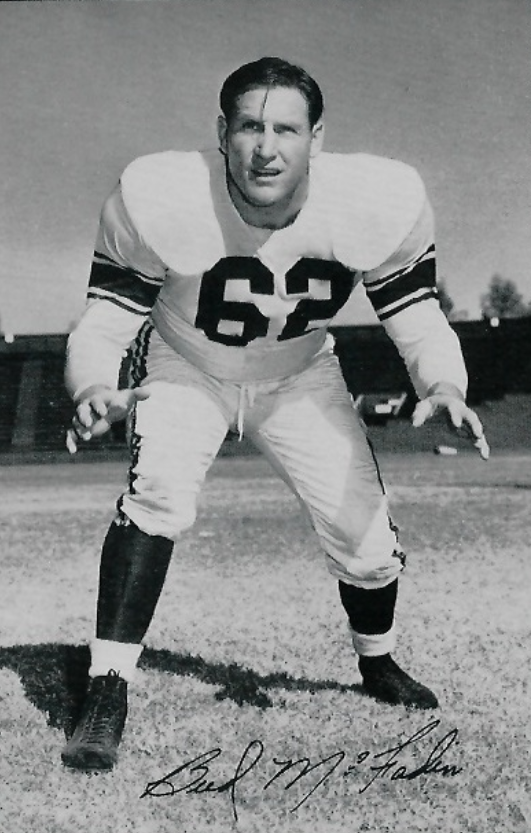
- McFadin in 1953

No. 62, 64
- Positions: Defensive tackle, linebacker, guard

Personal information
- Born: August 21, 1928; Rankin, Texas, U.S.
- Died: February 13, 2006 (aged 77); Victoria, Texas, U.S.
- Listed height: 6 ft 3 in (1.91 m)
- Listed weight: 260 lb (118 kg)

Career information
- High school: Iraan (Iraan, Texas)
- College: Texas
- NFL draft: 1951: 1st round, 11th overall pick

Career history

Playing
- Los Angeles Rams (1952–1956); Denver Broncos (1960–1963); Houston Oilers (1964–1965)

Coaching
- Houston Oilers (1966–1970) Defensive line coach

Awards and highlights
- 2× Pro Bowl (1955, 1956); 3× All-AFL (1960–1962); 3× AFL All-Star (1961–1963); Unanimous All-American (1950); First-team All-American (1949); 2× First-team All-SWC (1949, 1950)

Career NFL/AFL statistics
- Fumble recoveries: 4
- Interceptions: 1
- Sacks: 13.5
- Total touchdowns: 3
- Stats at Pro Football Reference
- College Football Hall of Fame

Lewis Pate "Bud" McFadin (August 21, 1928 – February 13, 2006) was an American professional football player and coach. He played college football for the Texas Longhorns and was a unanimous selection at the guard position on the 1950 College Football All-America Team. He played professionally in the National Football League (NFL) for the Los Angeles Rams (1952–1956) and in the American Football League (AFL) for the Denver Broncos (1960–1963) and Houston Oilers (1964–1965). A versatile player, he played tackle and linebacker on defense, as well as guard on offense. He was a Pro Bowl pick in 1955 and 1956, a Sporting News All-AFL defensive tackle in 1960, 1961 and 1962, and an American Football League West Division All-Star in 1963.

McFadin was inducted into the College Football Hall of Fame in 1983. He died on February 13, 2006, at a hospital in Victoria, Texas.

== See also ==
- List of American Football League players
- List of Los Angeles Rams first-round draft picks
- List of Texas Longhorns football All-Americans
