= Farm to Market Road 11 =

Highway in Texas, United States

Farm to Market Road 11

Route information
- Maintained by TxDOT
- Length: 51.6 mi (83.0 km)
- Existed: March 26, 1942–present

Major junctions
- West end: SH 18 in Grandfalls
- FM 1053 in Imperial; US 67 / US 385 in Girvin; FM 1901; Loop 293 in Bakersfield
- East end: I-10 in Bakersfield

Location
- Country: United States
- State: Texas
- Counties: Ward, Crane, Pecos

Highway system
- Highways in Texas; Interstate; US; State; Former; Toll; Loops; Spurs; FM/RM; Park; Rec
| ← Loop 11 | → PR 11 |

Farm to Market Road 11 (FM 11) is a Farm to Market Road maintained by the Texas Department of Transportation (TxDOT) located in Ward, Crane, and Pecos counties in west Texas. The 51.6-mile (83.0 km) road begins at State Highway 18 in Grandfalls and passes through Imperial and Girvin before terminating at Interstate 10 in Bakersfield.

The road was originally designated in 1942 between Grandfalls and Imperial and has been incrementally lengthened over the years incorporating a former route of FM 847 before the road was completed in 1975. The road crosses U.S. Route 67 and U.S. Route 385 in Girvin.

== Route description ==
FM 11 begins at SH 18 on the southeastern edge of Grandfalls in Ward County. The road proceeds to the southeast approaching the Pecos River and briefly crosses the southwestern corner of Crane County before crossing the river into Pecos County. The road then enters Imperial where it intersects FM 1053. The road continues in a generally southeastern direction roughly parallel to the Pecos River and crosses the South Orient Rail Line before intersecting US 67 and US 385 at Girvin. The road then continues in a more southerly direction away from the river and intersects FM 1901 north of Bakersfield. In Bakersfield, the road crosses Loop 293 before terminating at I-10.

The road encounters mostly flat terrain through ranch land, oil fields, and salt flats in the valley of the Pecos River for most of its length before passing between hills from Girvin to Bakersfield.

== History ==
FM 11 was originally designated on March 26, 1942 from SH 18, then known as SH 82 in Grandfalls to Imperial. On June 11, 1945, FM 11 was extended southward along SH 82 to a point 15 miles (24 km) north of Fort Stockton and then to the northeast 8.0 miles (12.9 km) to the county road to Imperial now known as FM 1053. That extension was rescinded on February 26, 1946 when the road was instead extended to the southeast through the former community of Abell City to Buena Vista Rd. On October 29, 1948, the road was extended an additional 10.1 miles (16.3 km) miles to the southeast, for a total length of 27.0 miles (43.5 km). The road was extended an additional 8.0 miles (12.9 km) to Girvin on July 14, 1949. On May 23, 1951, FM 11 was extended southeast 4.4 miles (7.1 km) to US 67.

On October 29, 1948, FM 847 was designated from US 67 in Girvin to Loop 293, which was then the route of US 290 through Bakersfield. The FM 847 designation was canceled on July 30, 1951, and the route was combined with FM 11. FM 847 was reused for a road in Terry County on July 25, 1951 (numbered July 30), and when that was cancelled, FM 847 was reused for a road in Erath County. In addition, 4.4 miles (7.1 km) between FM 11 and FM 847 were added. FM 11 was extended southward in Bakersfield to I-10 on March 31, 1975.

== Major intersections ==
| County | Location | mi | km | Destinations | Notes |
|---|---|---|---|---|---|
| Ward | Grandfalls | 0 | 0.0 | SH 18 – Fort Stockton, Monahans | Western terminus |
| Crane | No major junctions | | | | |
| Pecos | Imperial | 10.8 | 17.4 | FM 1053 – Fort Stockton, Tubbs Corner | |
| Pecos | Girvin | 37.3 | 60.0 | US 67 / US 385 – Fort Stockton, McCamey, Rankin | |
| Pecos | | 48.1 | 77.4 | FM 1901 – McCamey | |
| Pecos | Bakersfield | 51.0 | 82.1 | Loop 293 | |
| Pecos | Bakersfield | 51.6 | 83.0 | I-10 – Van Horn, San Antonio | I-10 exit 294; eastern terminus. |
1.000 mi = 1.609 km; 1.000 km = 0.621 mi
