= Texas State Highway Loop 293 =

State highway in Texas

State Highway Loop 293
- Loop 293 highlighted in red

Route information
- Maintained by TxDOT
- Length: 3.196 mi (5.143 km)
- Existed: 1981–present

Major junctions
- West end: I-10 north service road
- FM 11 in Bakersfield
- East end: I-10 north service road

Location
- Country: United States
- State: Texas
- Counties: Pecos

Highway system
- Highways in Texas; Interstate; US; State; Former; Toll; Loops; Spurs; FM/RM; Park; Rec
← SH 293	→ FM 293

State Highway Loop 293 or Loop 293 is a highway in the U.S. state of Texas maintained by the Texas Department of Transportation (TxDOT). The 3.2-mile (5.1 km) route is a remnant of the former U.S. Route 290 through the ghost town of Bakersfield in eastern Pecos County east of Fort Stockton before the construction of Interstate 10. Both ends of the route terminate at service roads of I-10, and the loop has one major intersection with Farm to Market Road 11 in Bakersfield. The route has been included in the state highway system under various designations since the original formation of the state system.

== Route description ==
Loop 293 begins along the north service road of I-10 just south of Squawteat Peak west of Bakersfield. After 1.5 miles (2.4 km) the route intersects FM 11 in the center of Bakersfield. The route proceeds for another 1.7 miles (2.7 km) before returning to the I-10 north service road. The road passes through the Taylor-Link Oil and Gas Field, and follows a generally straight path through gentle terrain with little physical relief.

There is no direct connection between Loop 293 and the main roadways of I-10. The north service road at the west end of Loop 293 ends abruptly a short distance away with no entrance or exit ramps. Access to the loop from I-10 is by way of FM 11 at Exit 294, and westbound motorists on I-10 can also reach the east end by following the north service road from Exit 298 at Ranch to Market Road 2886.

== History ==
Loop 293 was originally designated as a 7.7-mile (12.4 km) Travis County route along the south side of the city of Austin on August 24, 1955. That route began at the current intersection of US 290 and Loop 343, then proceeded along the present SH 71 ending at the current intersection of US 183 with SH 71. The route of the original loop now carries US 290 west of I-35. The original route designation was replaced by US 290 and SH 71 on May 30, 1961, with the old route becoming Loop 343.

The present Loop 293, despite its short distance and the small size of the community it serves, overlays a roadway that has been part of several significant highway routes since the beginning of the state's highway system. Soon after the Texas State Highway Department, a predecessor to TxDOT, was established in 1917, the agency proposed State Highway 10 that included the present loop. That proposal came to fruition locally by 1919, and the road became part of the seven percent of the state's highway network receiving 50% federal funding under the Federal Aid Highway Act of 1921.

SH 10 was locally reassigned as part of SH 27 by 1926. That same year the American Association of State Highway Officials (AASHO) adopted the network of United States Numbered Highways which was published in 1927. At that time the road became part of US 290 while maintaining its SH 27 designation. The redundant state designation was removed by the 1939 general redescription of the state highway system.

The I-10 bypass around Bakersfield was constructed in 1976. US 290 was rerouted along the I-10 bypass, and the original roadway was designated Loop 293 on March 19, 1981. After the completion of I-10 in western Texas, US 290 was decommissioned west of its intersection with I-10 southeast of Junction in 1992.

== Major intersections ==
The entire route is in Pecos County.

Location	mi	km	Destinations	Notes
	0	0.0	I-10 west (Frontage Road)	Western terminus
Bakersfield	1.5	2.4	FM 11 – Imperial	
	3.2	5.1	I-10 west (Frontage Road)	Eastern terminus
1.000 mi = 1.609 km; 1.000 km = 0.621 mi
