= Austonia, Texas =

Ghost town in Texas, US

Austonia
- Ghost town
- Location in Texas
- Coordinates: 32.18876020°N 96.73527020°W
- Country: United States
- State: Texas
- County: Ellis

Austonia, also called Astonia and Astoria, is a ghost town in Ellis County, Texas, United States. Located on an offshoot of Farm to Market Road 984, it was settled in 1876, by Thomas Alston, who named the community after himself. A post office operated from 1879 to 1900, then was consolidated by nearby Rankin. The town peaked in the 1890s, with ten residents, and was abandoned by the 1980s.
