= Tunas Peak =

Peak in Pecos County, Texas

- Squawteat Peak
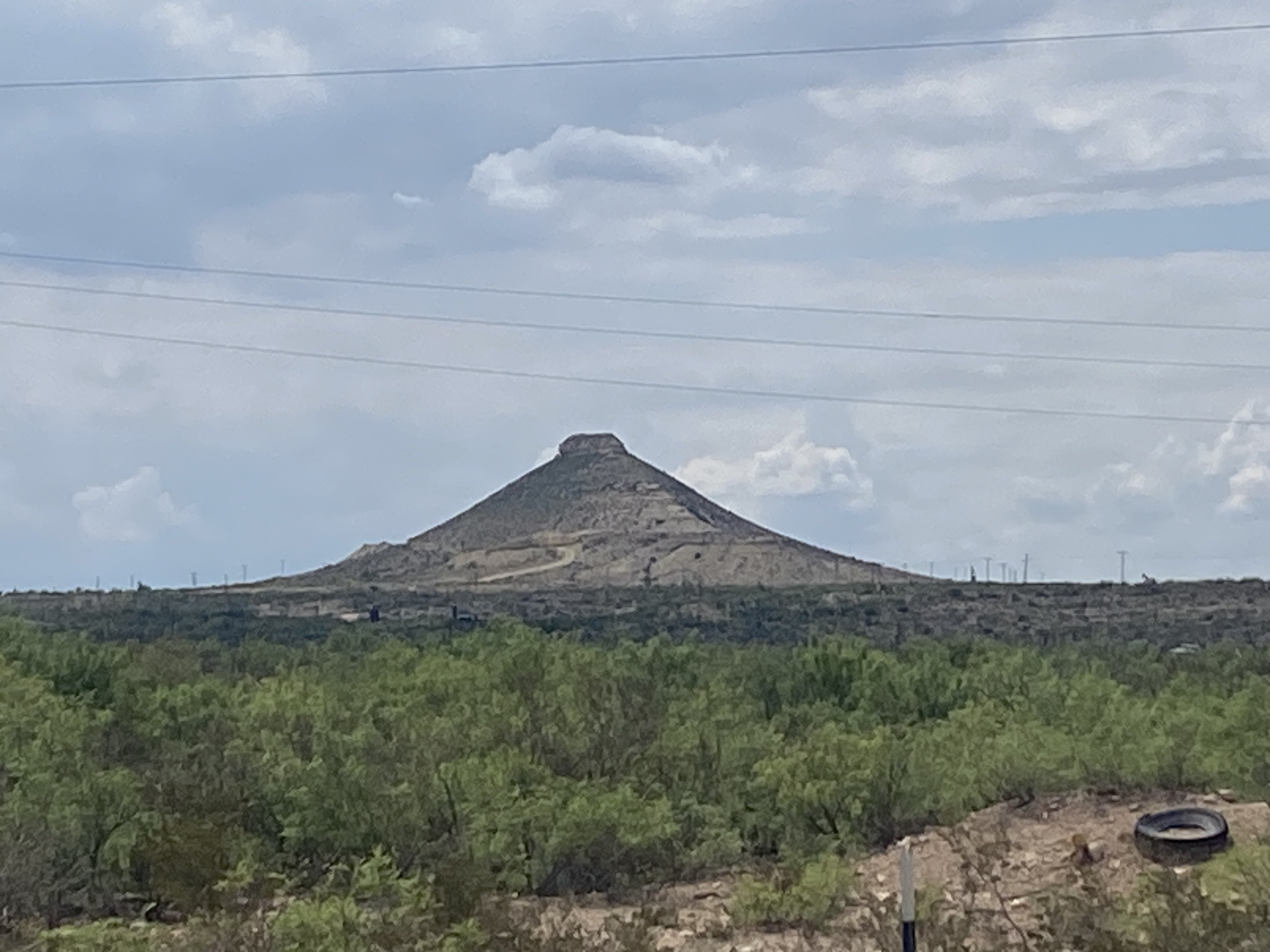
- View from Bakersfield, Texas.

Highest point
- Elevation: 2924 ft (891 m)
- Prominence: 278 ft (84 m)
- Coordinates: 30°53′38″N 102°19′26″W

Geography
- Location within Texas

Tunas Peak, also known as Squawteat Peak, is a breast-shaped hill in Pecos County, Texas.

== Archaeology ==
Archaeological features found at Tunas Peak include tipi rings as well as several fire-cracked rock middens. Artifacts found include various projectile points (primarily Perdiz, Livermore, and Langtry types) and shell pendants. Excavations took place in 1974 and 1980 under the Texas Department of Highways and Public Transportation during the construction and expansion of Interstate Highway 10 in compliance with Section 106 of the National Historic Preservation Act.

== Name ==
The hill is named for its proximity to Tunas Creek. The more regionally common name of Squawteat Peak is a reference to the ethnic and sexual slur squaw, and is now generally avoided in academic circles.

Writing for The Austin Chronicle, Gerald McLeod nicknamed the mountain "Perky Breast Mountain" to avoid using the colloquial local name.

== Tourism ==
The town of Bakersfield has long been a ghost town, but Tunas Peak's distinctive appearance, offensive local name, and location off Interstate Highway 10 has led to it becoming a notable roadside attraction. A gas station in Bakersfield sells hats and keychains depicting the peak.

== See also ==
- Texas State Highway Loop 293
