= Buena Vista High School (Texas) =

Coordinates: 31.2755°N 102.6945°W

Location
- 404 West Highway 11; Imperial, Texas 79743-0310; United States

Information
- School type: Public high school
- School district: Buena Vista Independent School District
- Principal: Julian Castillo
- Staff: 17.03 (on an FTE basis)
- Grades: PK-12
- Enrollment: 255 (2023-2024)
- Student to teacher ratio: 14.97
- Colors: Blue and old gold
- Athletics conference: UIL Class A
- Mascot: Longhorn
- Website: Buena Vista High School website

Buena Vista High School or Buena Vista School is a public high school located in Imperial, Texas (USA) and classified as a 1A school by the UIL. It is part of the Buena Vista Independent School District located in extreme north central Pecos County. In 2015, the school was rated "Met Standard" by the Texas Education Agency.

== Athletics ==
The Buena Vista Longhorns compete in these sports

Cross Country, Volleyball, 6-Man Football, Basketball, Golf, Tennis & Track

=== State titles ===
- Girls Cross Country -
  - 2021(1A)
- Volleyball -
  - 1968(B), 1970(B), 1971(B), 1977(B)

== Theatre ==
- One Act Play State Champions
  - 1973(B)
