= Girvin (disambiguation) =

Garvin may refer to:

== People ==
- Steven Girvin (born in 1950), American physicist
- Tommy Girvin, American guitarist

== Places ==
- Girvin, community in Iowa
- Girvin, community in Texas
- Girvin, former village in Saskatchewan

== See also ==
- Girvin (born in 2014), American Thoroughbred racehorse
