= Rankin Independent School District =

School district in Texas

Coordinates: 31.2278°N 101.9419°W

Rankin Independent School District is a public school district located in Rankin, Texas (USA).

== Academic achievement ==
In 2009, the school district was rated "recognized" by the Texas Education Agency.

== Schools ==
The district has two schools -

- Rankin High School (Grades 6–12)
- James Gossett Elementary School (Grades PK-5)

== Special programs ==
=== Athletics ===
Rankin High School plays six-man football.

== See also ==
- List of school districts in Texas
