= Tipi ring =

Circular patterns of stones left by historical Native Americans

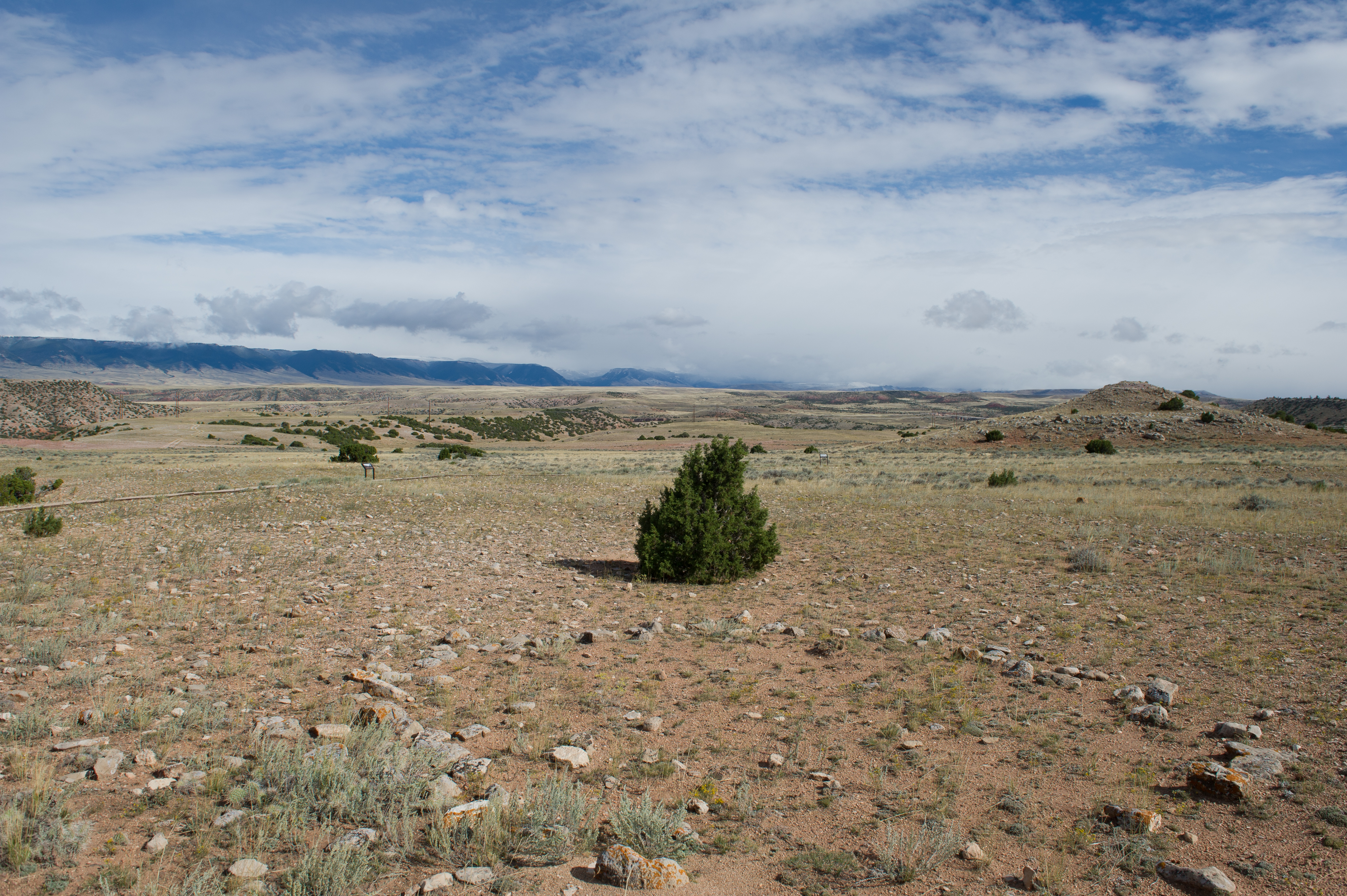
Tipi rings in the Pryor Mountains

Tipi rings are circular patterns of stones left from an encampment of Post-Archaic, protohistoric and historic Native Americans. They are found primarily throughout the Plains of the United States and Canada, and also in the foothills and parks of the Rocky Mountains.

Clusters of stones circles are often found in favorable camp-sites, near water, fuel and good hunting grounds. In many cases the clusters are organized in patterns, such as rows, circles or v-shapes. The stones were used to hold down the tipis to keep the lodge warm and dry. In some cases elaborate walls or defensive structures were built.

== Tipi ring practices ==
They are generally found in the Great Plains of the United States and Canada, but are also found in the foothills and mountains, near good areas for hunting, supplies of water and fuel, and main routes of travel. The rings are often 6 to 25 feet (1.8 to 7.6 m) in diameter and often occur in groupings. The rings of stone held down the edges of animal skin hides of the cone-shaped tipis, to keep them snug against the ground. The general pattern of a tipi (also "tepee") ring is an east-facing entrance, where there are no stones, and a heavily anchored side with extra stones for protection against prevailing winds, often on the northwestern side of the ring. Hearths found in the center of tipi rings suggest a winter encampment. In the summer, food was cooked in open-air hearths. There are generally few artifacts found at these sites.

Stone circles, of which tipi rings are an example, may be simply assembled rocks placed in single or multiple courses. More elaborate circles have been constructed in walls of stone or with horizontal logs and stone, possibly for a fort or corral. Other stone circles – some more than 39 feet (12 m) across – may be the remains of special ceremonial dance structures. A few cobble arrangements form the outlines of human figures, most of them clearly male. Perhaps the most intriguing cobble constructions, however, are the ones known as medicine wheels. Tipi rings are nearly all of the types of stone circles, except those that are medicine wheels or of very small diameter.

Stones were replaced by wooden pegs to hold down the tents after the introduction of axes by people of European ancestry. In the Crow language the word for precolonial times literally means "when we used stones to weigh down our lodges."

== Blackfeet Indian Reservation study ==
From a study of 137 sites on the 2,000-square-mile (5,200 km^{2}) Blackfeet Indian Reservation, tipis were often arranged in a pattern, such as a single or double row, semi-circle, circle, triangle, V-shape or a haphazard shape. Artifacts found were limited to tools or fragments of tools made of stone or bone, such as broken projectile points, hammerstones, grooved mauls and pieces of flint or imported obsidian. When horses were introduced after about A.D. 1730, camp materials were pulled by horses rather than dogs and the tipis became larger, from holding 6-8 people to up to 50 people.

== Sites ==
Canada

- Alberta:

In 1989 there were 4,290 tipi rings recorded in the provincial inventory of archaeological sites (slightly more than 20% of all sites in the inventory).

  - Carmangay Tipi Ring Site
  - Nose Hill Park
  - Suffield Tipi Rings National Historical Site
  - Writing-on-Stone Provincial Park
- Saskatchewan
  - Grasslands National Park
  - Wanuskewin Heritage Park

United States

Between Green River, Wyoming and Denver, Colorado, a 300 miles (480 km) long corridor, there are 136 tipi ring sites.

- Colorado:

During the protohistoric and historic periods, tipi rings were created in the mountains by the Ute people. Sites on the plains belonged to Apache, Arapaho, Cheyenne and Comanche people.
- Northern mountain and foothills:
  - Indian Mountain near Boulder
  - T-W Diamond site in the Rocky Mountain foothills near Fort Collins.
- Northeastern plains
  - Biscuit Hill Site (78 - 100 tipi rings)
  - Keota Stone Circles Archaeological District
- Southeastern plains
  - Carrizo Ranches (possibly Apache sites)
  - Picture Canyon of the Comanche National Grassland.

- Montana:
  - Blackfeet Indian Reservation has 210 tipi ring sites over a 2000 square mile area.
  - Canyon Ferry Reservoir area has 16 tipi ring sites within a 500 square mile area, found along the Missouri River or its tributaries or mountain valleys.
  - First Peoples Buffalo Jump State Park
- Texas:
  - Squawteat Peak (see Pecos County)
- Wyoming:
  - Basin Oil Field Tipi Rings
  - Shoshone National Forest
