= Howe Independent School District =

School district in Texas

Address
- 105 W. Tutt Street Howe, TX, USA ESC Region 10
- Coordinates: 33°40′3″N 96°36′48″W

District information
- Type: Independent School District
- Motto: Educating the Hope of Tomorrow
- Grades: PK-12
- Established: 1905; 121 years ago
- Superintendent: Ritchie Bowling
- Governing agency: Texas Education Agency
- Schools: 3
- NCES District ID: 4823670

Students and staff
- Students: 1,194 (2025-26)
- Athletic conference: UIL Class AAAA
- District mascot: Bulldogs
- Colors: Black, White, & Gray

Other information
- Website: www.howeisd.net

Howe Independent School District (Howe ISD, HISD) is a public school district based in Howe, Texas, United States. Covering 75 square miles in south central Grayson County, the district serves the cities of Howe and Dorchester, as well as their surrounding areas.

As of 2026, Howe ISD operates three campuses, including one high school, one middle school, and one elementary school. The district most recently received a C rating from the Texas Education Agency (TEA).

== Schools ==
School name	Grades	Additional information
Howe High School	9-12	
Howe Middle School	5-8	
Summit Hill Elementary School	PK-4	
