= Sundown High School =

Location
- 511 East 7th Street; Sundown, Texas 79372-1110; United States; 33.459988°N 102.485349°W

Information
- School type: Public high school
- School district: Sundown Independent School District
- Superintendent: Miguel Salazar
- Principal: Jeremy Griffith
- Grades: 9-12
- Enrollment: 174 (2023-2024)
- Colors: Royal Blue & Red
- Athletics conference: UIL Class AA
- Mascot: Roughneck Joe
- Yearbook: Gusher
- Website: www.sundownisd.com

Sundown High School is a public high school located in Sundown, Texas (USA) and classified as a 2A school by the UIL. It is part of the Sundown Independent School District located in southern Hockley County. The school is widely recognized for its stellar academics, great cross country program, and, like most small Texas towns, its football team. In 2017–2018, the school won the UIL Lone Star Cup for 2A.

Athletics

The Sundown Roughnecks compete in the following sports:

- Baseball
- Basketball
- Cross Country
- Football
- Golf
- Powerlifting
- Softball
- Tennis
- Track and Field

== State titles ==
- Girls' Basketball
  - 1961(1A)
  - 1962(1A)
  - 1963(1A)
- Boys' Cross Country
  - 1988(1A)
  - 1989(1A)
  - 1990(2A)
  - 1992(2A)
  - 1994(2A)
  - 1995(2A)
  - 2005(1A)
  - 2007(1A)
  - 2010(1A)
  - 2016(2A)
- Girls' Cross Country
  - 2005(1A)
  - 2006(1A)
  - 2014(2A)
  - 2016(2A)
- Girls' Golf
  - 1983(1A)
- Softball
  - 2025(2A/D2)

== Band ==
As of 2021, the Sundown High School marching band holds records at the UIL State Marching Band Competition for most total appearances (28), most finals appearances (26), and tied for the most championships (8).

- Marching Band State Champions
  - 1987(1A)
  - 1988(1A)
  - 1989(1A)
  - 2003(1A)^
  - 2005(1A)
  - 2009(1A)
  - 2011(1A)
  - 2024(2A)

^were co-champion with Throckmorton High School
