= Sundown Independent School District =

School district in Texas

Sundown Independent School District is a public school district based in Sundown, Texas, United States.

In addition to Sundown, the district also serves rural areas in southwestern Hockley County.

Sundown ISD has three campuses - Sundown High (Grades 9-12), Sundown Junior High (Grades 6-8), and Sundown Elementary (Grades PK-5).

In 2009, the school district was rated "recognized" by the Texas Education Agency.
