= Howe, Texas =

- Town
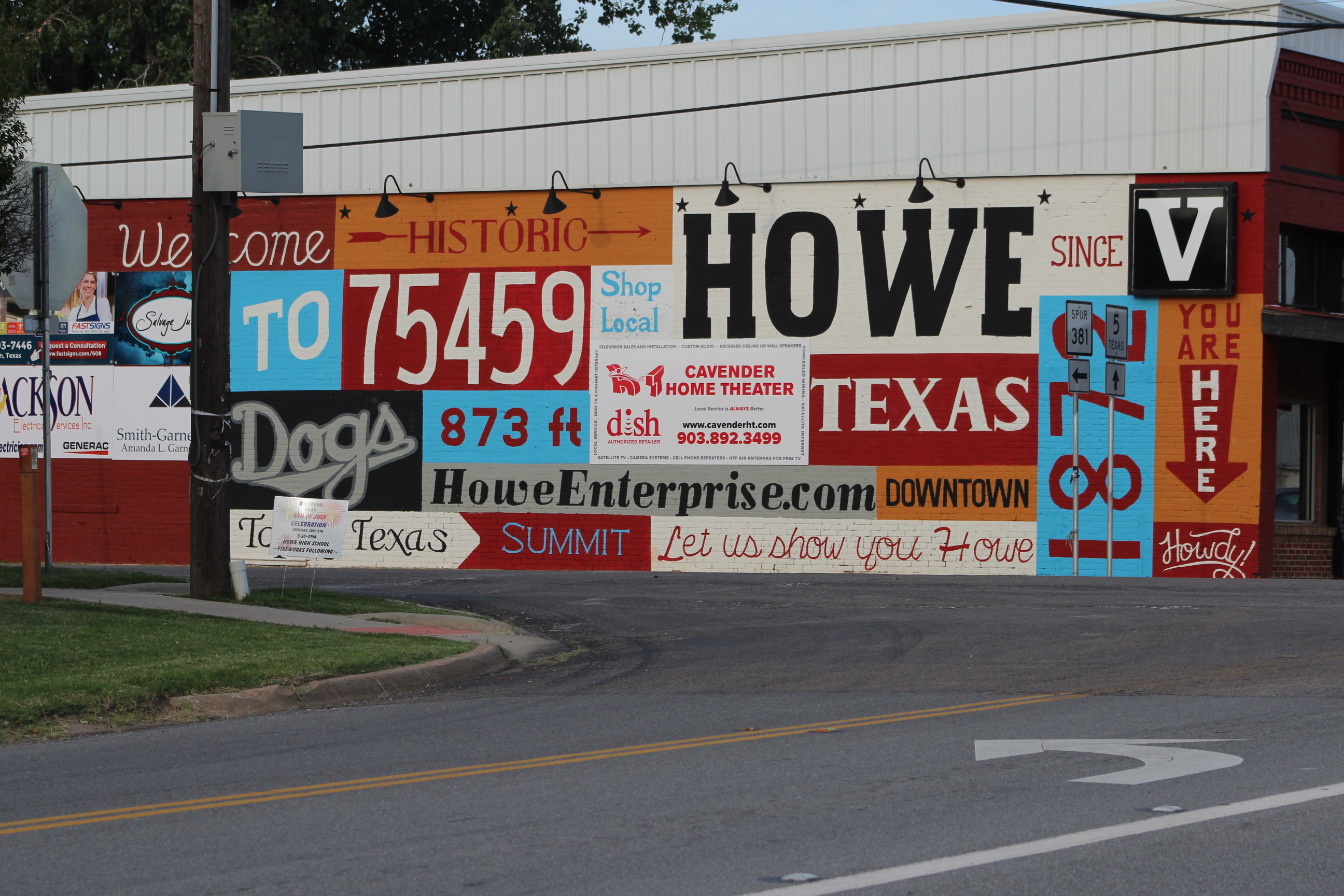
- Downtown Howe

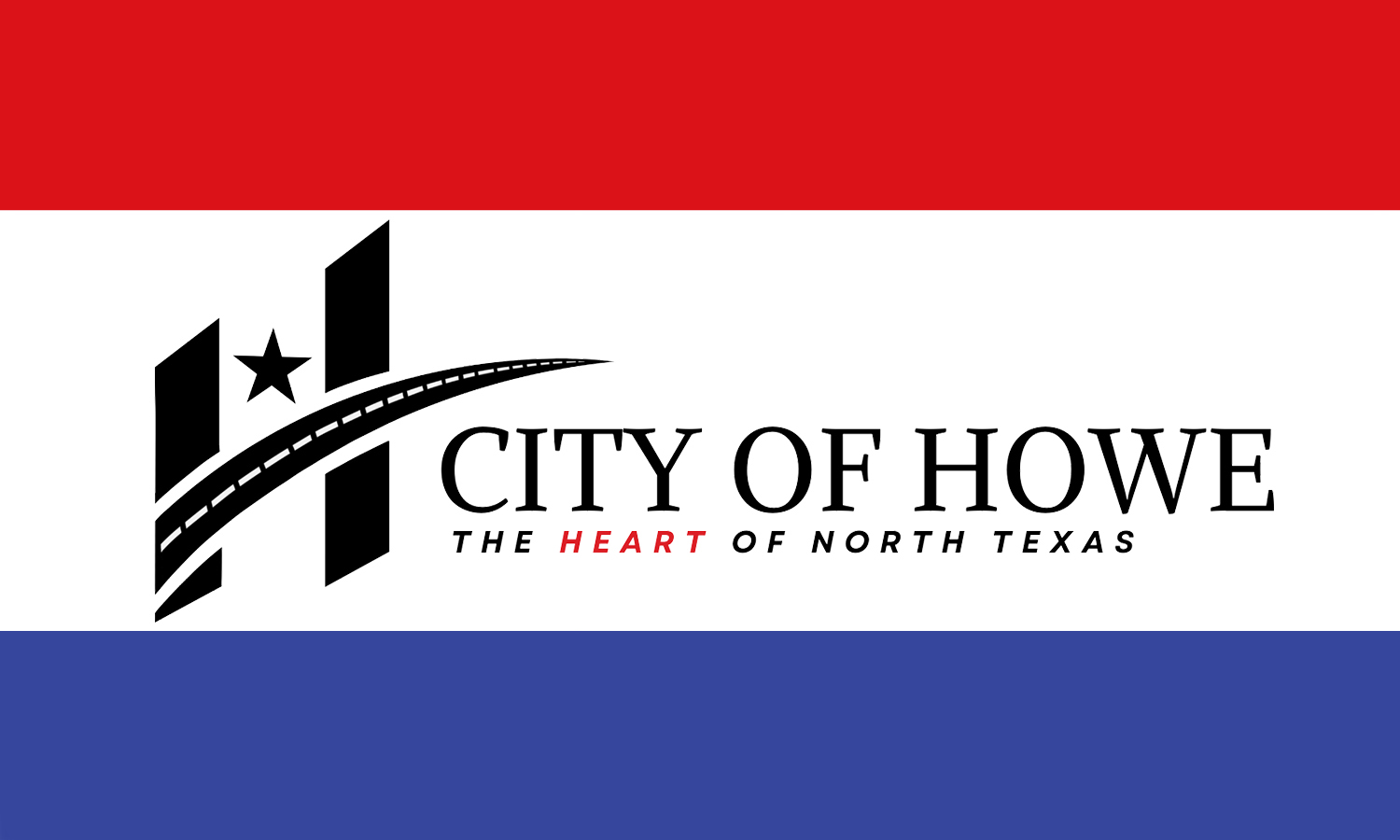
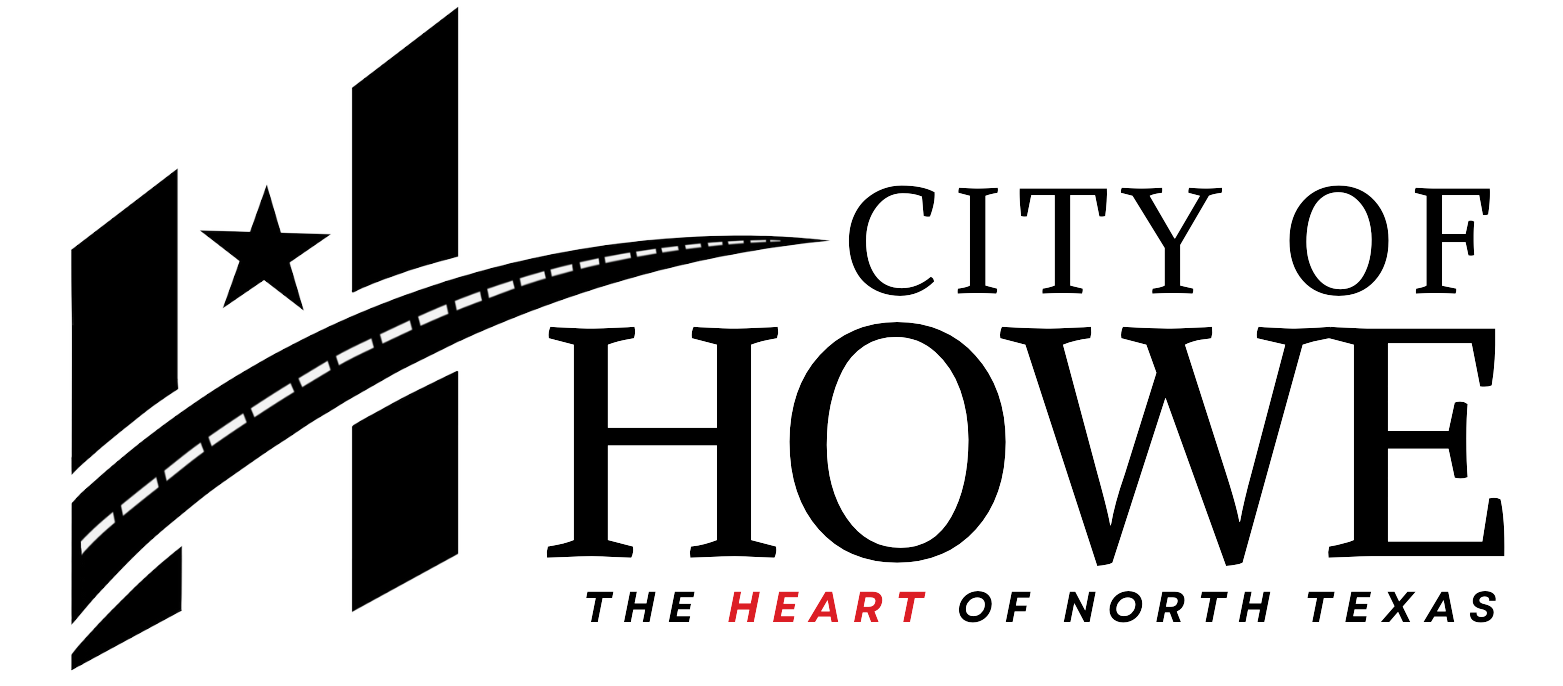
- Flag Seal

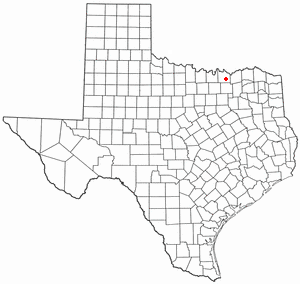
- Location of Howe, Texas

- Coordinates: 33°30′18″N 96°36′51″W
- Country: United States
- State: Texas
- County: Grayson

Government
  - Mayor: Karla McDonald
  - City Administrator: Monte Walker

Area
  - Total: 5.10 sq mi (13.22 km^{2})
  - Land: 5.10 sq mi (13.22 km^{2})
  - Water: 0 sq mi (0.00 km^{2})
- Elevation: 797 ft (243 m)

Population (2020)
  - Total: 3,571
  - Density: 699.8/sq mi (270.19/km^{2})
- Time zone: UTC-6 (Central (CST))
  - Summer (DST): UTC-5 (CDT)
- ZIP code: 75459
- Area codes: 903, 430
- FIPS code: 48-35084
- GNIS feature ID: 2412773
- Website: cityofhowetx.gov

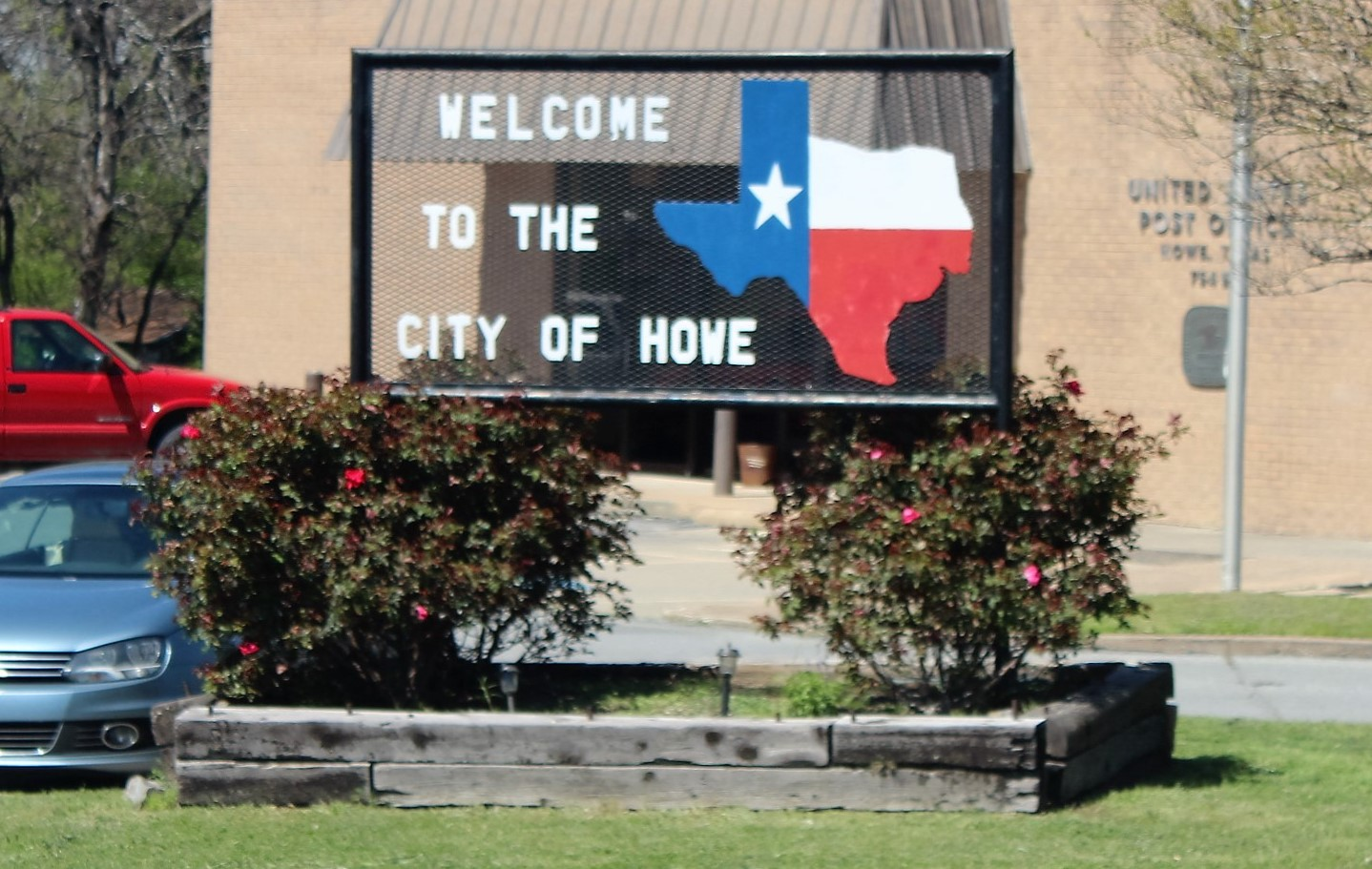
Welcome to Howe

Howe is a town in Grayson County, Texas, United States. The population was 3,571 in the 2020 United States census. It is part of the Sherman–Denison metropolitan statistical area.

== History ==
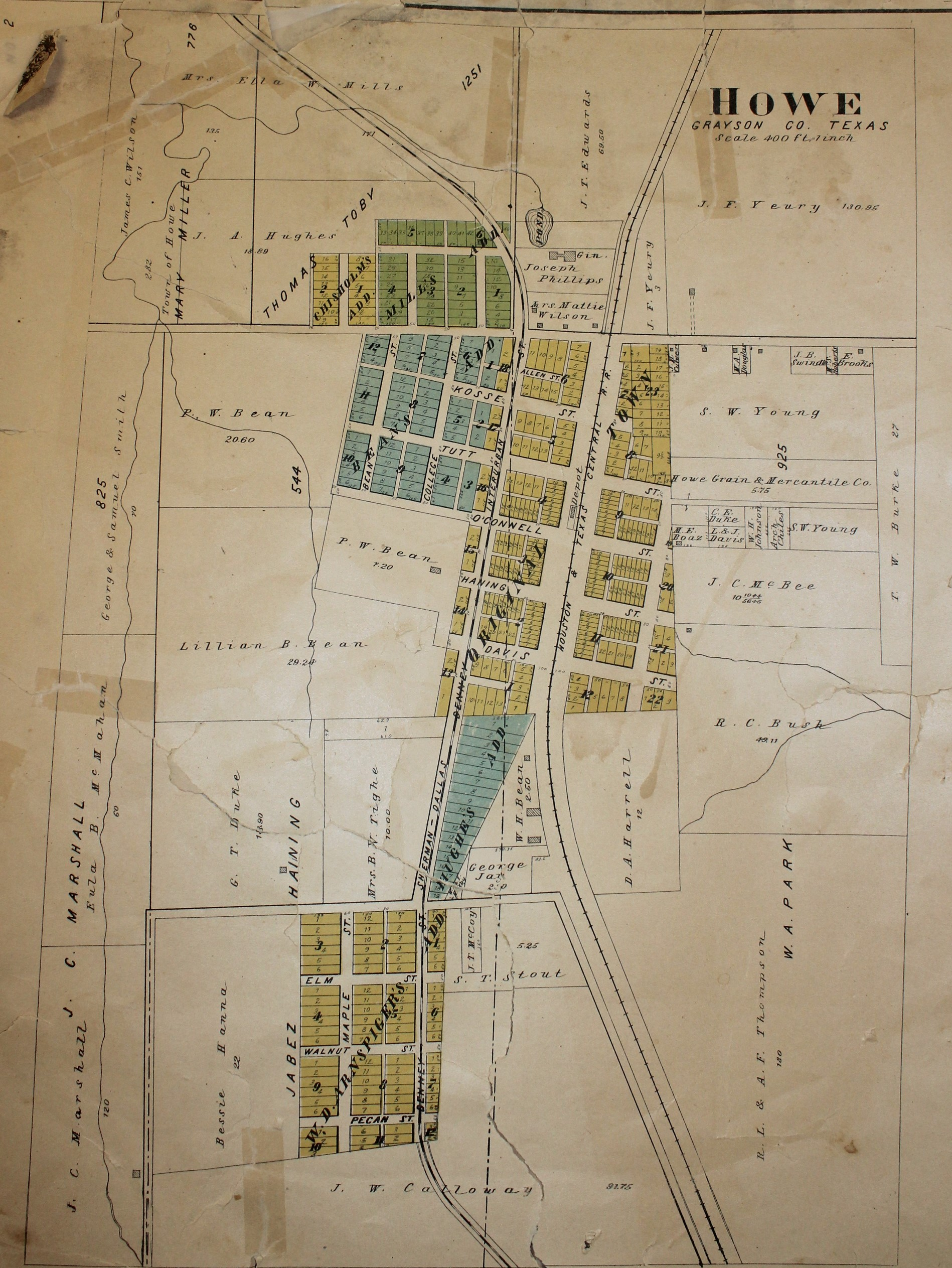
A 1910 map of Howe

The first settlers in the area arrived around the time of the Texas Revolution in 1836. In 1843, the last Indian battle in Grayson County was said to have been fought in the area. The first settlers of Howe were Jabez and Harriet Haning, and Jabez's brother John. They received land through the Peters colony after arriving from Pennsylvania before 1850. When the Houston and Texas Central Railway extended through the area in 1873, a railroad switch was located in the community. It was called "Summit" because, at 810 feet (250 m) above sea level, it was believed to be the highest point between the Red River and the Gulf of Mexico. In 1873, when Summit received a post office, two businesses were located at the switch—a general store and a saloon. Several houses were built to the east of the switch. Jabez Haning persuaded the railroad to establish a depot on his land by donating every second lot in his newly platted town to the railroad. In 1876, the names of the depot, the store, and the post office were changed to "Howe", after F. M. Howe, who worked for the Houston and Texas Central. Howe had three saloons until around 1900, when the town voted to prohibit the sale of alcohol. Its first one-room school building opened in 1877 and was replaced by a two-story building in 1884.

In 1884, Howe was incorporated, with George M. McCrary as mayor. By the late 1880s, the town had become a major grain shipping center, notably for red rust-proof oats. Several seed companies were founded there in that decade. Howe hosted a Farmers' Alliance Cooperative Association, which was absorbed by the Howe Grain and Mercantile Company in 1894. In 1890, Howe's population reached 450. The town included a steam gristmill, a Farmers' Alliance Cooperative, and Baptist and Methodist churches, along with various businesses such as hotels, doctors, druggists, and barbers. Several newspapers were published in Howe, such as the Howe Herald from 1890 to the 1910s and the Howe Messenger in the late 1930s and early 1940s. During the 1930s, the Howe Chronicle was published by former Governor James E. Ferguson and his brother A. M. Ferguson. The Howe Enterprise was established in 1963 by A.P. "Pop" Sloan.

During the May 15, 1896, an F5 category tornado passed through the west side of Howe and the Farmington community, sweeping away around 17 homes. On October 6, 1904, The Arlington Journal reported that a fire swept through Howe's business district, destroying four stores.

By 1914, the Texas Traction Company, better known as the Interurban, was providing service to Howe. This electric train ran between Denison and Dallas with a stop in Howe. By 1914, Howe also had the Farmers National Bank, the Howe Herald, three grain elevators, and an ice plant. The community's population had grown from 521 in 1904 to 680 in the early 1960s. It then rose rapidly through the early 1980s, reaching 2,173 by 1990. By 2000, the population was 2,478. Throughout most of its history, Howe remained primarily an agricultural center, though some oil has been produced in the area. During the early 1980s, Howe had approximately 30 businesses. In 1981, local industries included a shirt manufacturer and a hydraulics company. By 1991, the number of manufacturers in Howe had risen to five, including makers of plastics, electronics, and agricultural equipment.

On April 26, 2016, an EF1 category tornado struck Howe around 10:00 pm, injuring three people, damaging over 20 homes, and damaging the Howe High School. It began in a field behind the Summit Hill housing division, destroying a home off Smith Road. It then proceeded northeast, crossing US Hwy 75. Trucker Gene Marshall was filming it there; the storm tossed his truck and semitrailer, along with three cars, to the other side of the road. It then struck the north side of the high school before passing through Stark Lane. It then proceeded to the Luella/Ida area before dissipating.

== Geography ==
Howe is located in southern Grayson County at the intersection of U.S. Highway 75, Texas State Highway 5, and Farm to Market Road 902. It is bordered to the north by Sherman, the county seat.

According to the United States Census Bureau, the town has a total area of 5.1 square miles (13.2 km^{2}), all land.

Howe's elevation of 860 feet (260 m) is the highest point along US 75 between the Red River and the Gulf of Mexico.

== Demographics ==
Historical population
Census	Pop.	Note	%±
1890	284		—
1900	531		87.0%
1910	581		9.4%
1920	583		0.3%
1930	565		−3.1%
1940	546		−3.4%
1950	572		4.8%
1960	680		18.9%
1970	1,359		99.9%
1980	2,072		52.5%
1990	2,173		4.9%
2000	2,478		14.0%
2010	2,600		4.9%
2020	3,571		37.3%
U.S. Decennial Census

=== 2020 census ===
As of the 2020 census, Howe had a population of 3,571. The median age was 30.7 years. 30.9% of residents were under the age of 18 and 9.3% of residents were 65 years of age or older. For every 100 females, there were 96.0 males, and for every 100 females age 18 and over there were 91.8 males age 18 and over.

0.0% of residents lived in urban areas, while 100.0% lived in rural areas.

There were 1,262 households in Howe, including 775 family households. Of all households, 45.4% had children under the age of 18 living in them, 48.8% were married-couple households, 16.2% were households with a male householder and no spouse or partner present, and 27.3% were households with a female householder and no spouse or partner present. About 21.7% of all households were made up of individuals, and 7.9% had someone living alone who was 65 years of age or older.

There were 1,366 housing units, of which 7.6% were vacant. The homeowner vacancy rate was 2.0% and the rental vacancy rate was 8.2%.

Howe racial composition as of 2020 (NH = Non-Hispanic) (Note: Note: the US Census treats Hispanic/Latino as an ethnic category. This table excludes Latinos from the racial categories and assigns them to a separate category. Hispanics/Latinos can be of any race.)
Race	Number	Percentage
White (NH)	2,328	65.19%
Black or African American (NH)	147	4.12%
Native American or Alaska Native (NH)	39	1.09%
Asian (NH)	16	0.45%
Pacific Islander (NH)	5	0.14%
Some Other Race (NH)	13	0.36%
Mixed/Multi-Racial (NH)	168	4.7%
Hispanic or Latino	855	23.94%
Total	3,571	

== Traditions ==
=== Founders Day ===
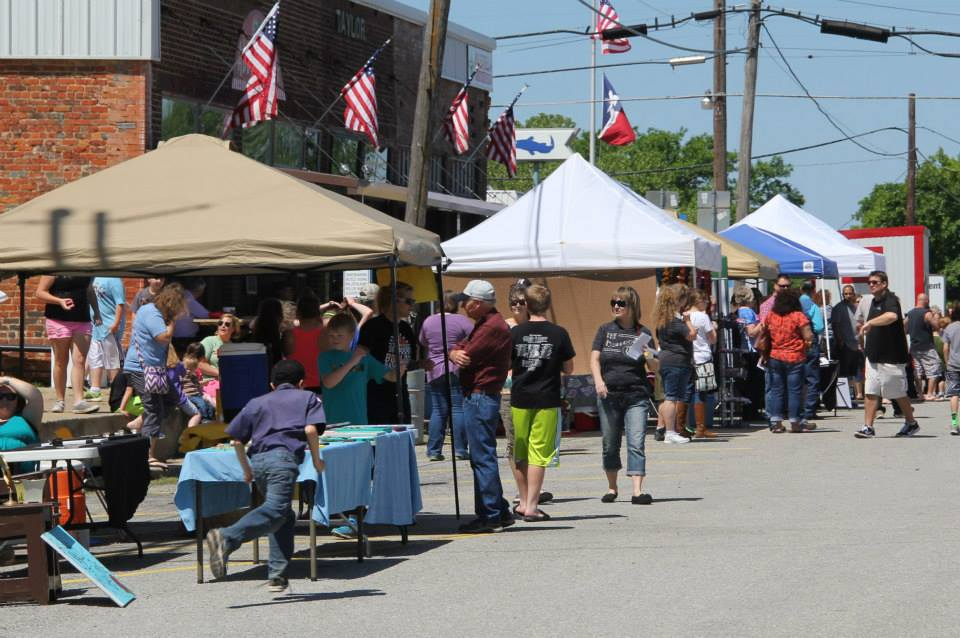
2015 Founders Day

Howe celebrates its history and origins every May with a Founders Day celebration. The first Founders Day in 1986 featured a professional rodeo along with many festival events. Each year, vendors set up stalls in the downtown parking spaces with items for sale. The festival features food, shaved ice, bounce houses, and other attractions. It is organized by the Howe Area Chamber of Commerce. The city celebrated the 30th anniversary of Founders Day on May 7, 2016, with live music for most of the evening.

== Education ==
The city is served by the Howe Independent School District and is home to the Howe High School Bulldogs.

== Media ==
=== Publications ===
Howe, Texas, was featured on the back page of the 2600 - The Hacker Quarterly magazine, Autumn 2024 edition, for its 2010 census population of exactly 2600.

=== Newspapers ===
- The Howe Enterprise
- The Herald Democrat

=== Radio stations ===
- KLAK Adult Contemporary 97.5
- KCBN 102.5
- KMKT Katy Country 93.1
- KDOC Doc FM 107.3

=== Television stations ===
- KTEN Channel 10 – (NBC)
- KTEN DT Channel 10.2 – (The CW Texoma)
- KTEN DT Channel 10.3 – (ABC)
- KXII Channel 12 – (CBS)
- KXII DT Channel 12.2 (My Texoma)
- KXII DT Channel 12.3 (Fox Texoma)

== Notable person ==
- Dale Milford, U.S. Representative, was a resident of Howe at the time of his death
