= Iraan High School =

Location
- 100 South Farr Street; Iraan, Texas 79744-0486; United States
- Coordinates: 30.9085°N 101.9012°W

Information
- School type: Public high school
- School district: Iraan-Sheffield Independent School District
- Principal: Ronnie D. Miller
- Teaching staff: 9.84 (FTE)
- Grades: 9-12
- Enrollment: 109 (2023-2024)
- Student to teacher ratio: 11.08
- Colors: Red & Black
- Athletics conference: UIL Class 1A
- Mascot: Brave/Bravette
- Newspaper: The Broadcaster
- Yearbook: The Rimrock
- Website: www.isisd.net/apps/pages/index.jsp?uREC_ID=3370044&type=d&pREC_ID=2380951

Iraan High School is a public high school located in Iraan, Texas, United States, and classified as a 1A school by the University Interscholastic League (UIL). It is part of the Iraan-Sheffield Independent School District located in extreme east central Pecos County. In 2015, the school was rated "Met Standard" by the Texas Education Agency. It is the home of the Iraan Braves and Bravettes.

== Athletics ==
The Iraan Braves compete in cross country, football, basketball, powerlifting, golf, tennis and track and field.

== Iraan Braves ==
=== Football ===
The Iraan Braves were district champions for four years in a row, with the streak ending in 2017.

=== State titles ===
- Boys Cross Country -
  - 2001(1A), 2002(1A), 2003(1A)
- Girls Cross Country -
  - 2002(1A)
- Football -
  - 1996(2A)
- Boys Golf -
  - 1954(B), 1972(1A), 2004(1A), 2005(1A)
- Girls Golf -
  - 1984(1A)

== Band ==
- Marching Band State Champions
  - 1980(1A), 1981(1A), 1983(1A), 1986(2A), 1987(2A), 1990(2A), 1991(2A),
