= The Howe Enterprise =

Local online newspaper in Howe, Texas

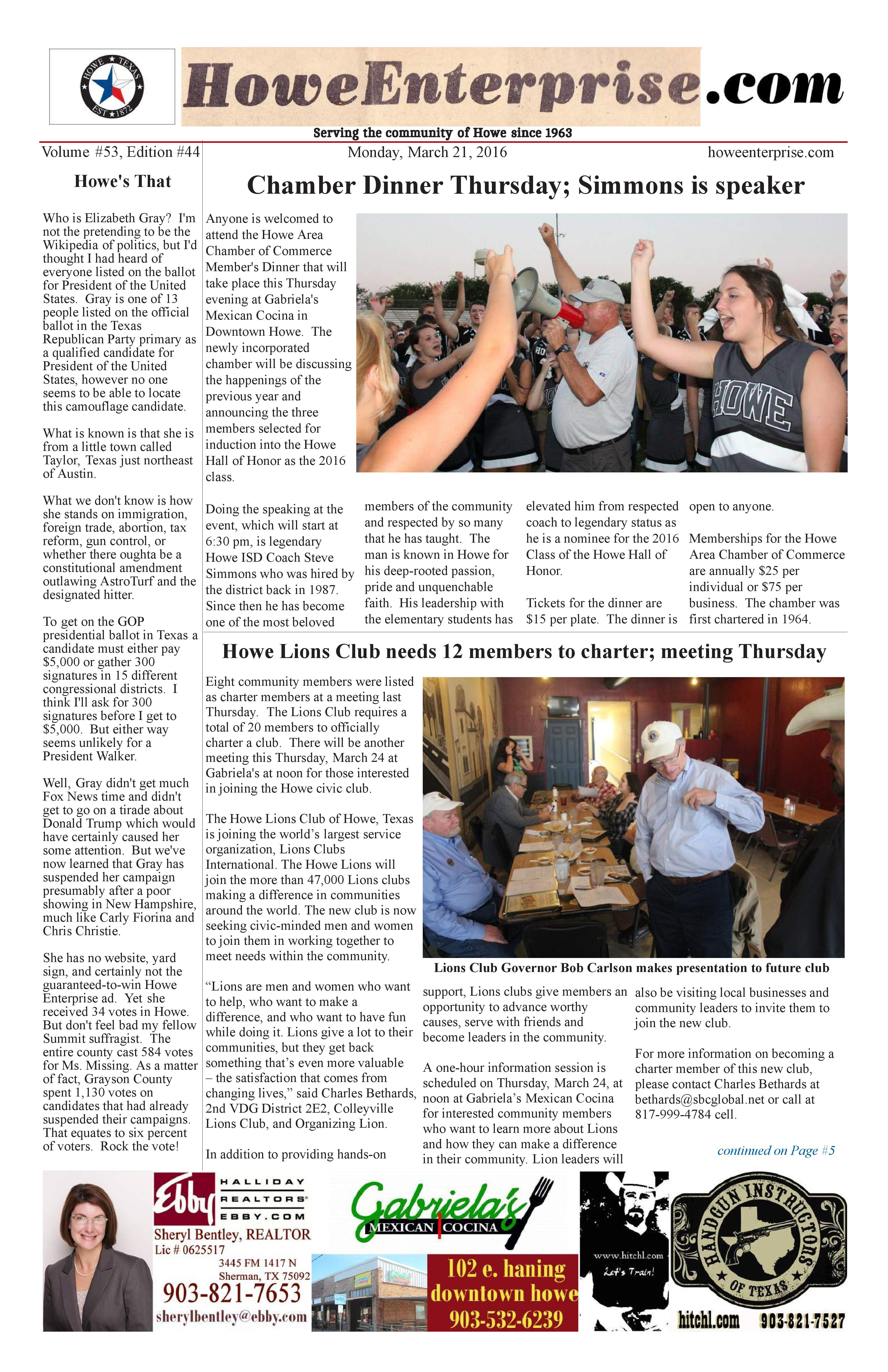
- The March 21, 2016 front page of The Howe Enterprise
- Type: Weekly online newspaper
- Owner(s): Victory Publishing
- Editor: Ashley Husbands
- Founded: 1963
- Circulation: 832 (as of 2023)
- Website: howeenterprise.com

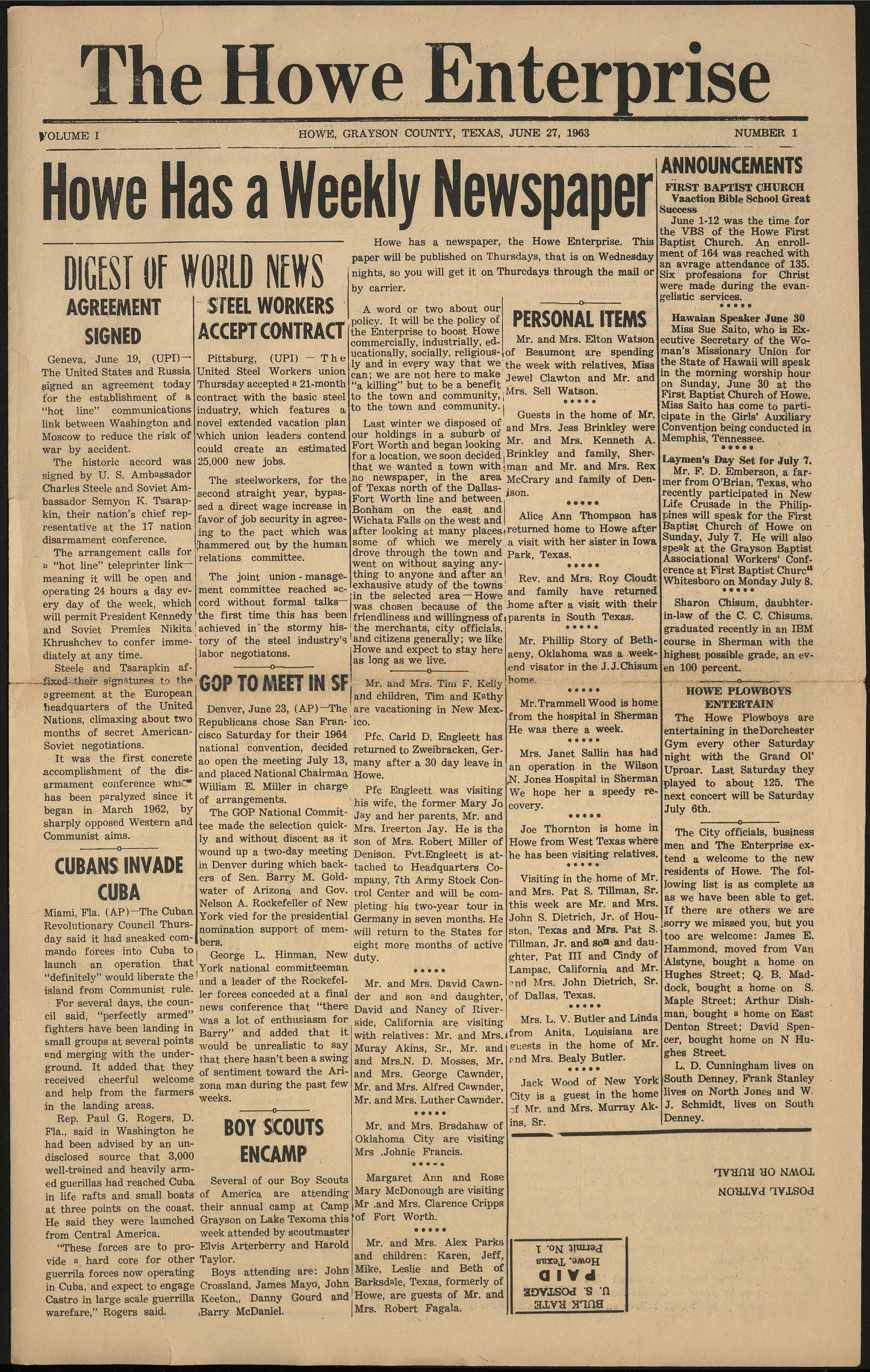
The first edition

The Howe Enterprise is a local online newspaper for the city of Howe, Texas, in the United States, 10 miles (16 km) south of Sherman, Texas.

== History ==
The Howe Enterprise was created in 1963 by A.P. "Pop" Sloan. Bob Walker purchased the newspaper in 1966 and ran the company under the Grayson Publishing Company until selling the publication to Jim and Nita Echols. The Echols family then sold The Howe Enterprise to Dale and Lana Rideout. During the Rideout's tenure, they changed the name from the Howe Enterprise to the Texoma Enterprise in 1997. They also stopped printing in 2011 and took the publication online as one of the first fully online newspapers in Texas. The Rideouts held on to the publication until 2014 when it was sold to the grandson of second owner Bob Walker. He formed Grayson Publishing, LLC and changed the name back to The Howe Enterprise. In November 2024, the publication was sold to Victory Publishing. The free publication has an average of approximately 100,000 visits per year. (Google Analytics).
