= Basin Oil Field Tipi Rings =

- Basin Oil Field Tipi Rings (48CA1667)
- U.S. National Register of Historic Places
- Nearest city: Piney, Wyoming
- NRHP reference No.: 85003165
- Added to NRHP: December 13, 1985

The Basin Oil Field Tipi Rings were first noted during a cultural resource inventory along a coal slurry pipeline route. Located near the confluence of Caballo Creek and the Belle Fourche River in northeastern Wyoming, the site primarily represents a Middle Missouri encampment in the Late Prehistoric or Protohistoric periods. The site may also have been occupied in the Late Archaic period. The middle Missouri tradition includes elements of the Mandan, Hidatsa and Crow.

The tipi ring site comprises seven stone circles, a stone cairn, a fire hearth and scattered stones.

The site was listed on the National Register of Historic Places in 1985.
