= Rankin High School (Texas) =

Location
- 1201 Upton Street; Rankin, Texas 79778-0090; United States; 31.229867°N 101.941497°W

Information
- School type: Public High School
- School district: Rankin Independent School District
- Principal: Adrian Gallardo
- Grades: 7-12
- Enrollment: 295 (2023-2024)
- Colors: Maroon & White
- Athletics conference: UIL Class A
- Mascot: Red Devils
- Website: Rankin High School

Rankin High School is a public high school located in Rankin, Texas, United States, and classified as a 1A school by the University Interscholastic League. It is part of the Rankin Independent School District located in southeastern Upton County

== Athletics ==
The Rankin Red Devils compete in these sports -

- Basketball
- Cross Country
- 6-Man Football
- Golf
- Powerlifting
- Tennis
- Track and Field
- Volleyball
- Marching Band

=== State Titles ===
- Boys Golf -
  - 1973(1A), 1974(1A), 1975(1A), 1976(1A), 1977(1A)
- Girls Golf -
  - 1978(1A), 2012(1A)
- One Act Play -
  - 1959(B), 1960(B), 1961(1A), 2021(1A)

==== State Finalist ====
- Football -
  - 1980(1A), 2025(6M/D1)

• Track -

• 2021 (1A)

== Notable alumni ==
- Paul Patterson, author and educator
