= Denver City Independent School District =

School district in Texas

Denver City Independent School District is a public school district based in Denver City, Texas (USA).

In 2009, the school district was rated "recognized" by the Texas Education Agency.

== Schools ==
- Denver City High School
  - 2007 National Blue Ribbon School
- W. G. Gravitt Junior High School
- Kelley/Dodson Elementary School
  - 2004 National Blue Ribbon School
