= Denver City High School (Texas) =

Coordinates: 32.9706°N 102.8371°W

Location
- 601 Mustang Ave; Denver City, Texas 79323; United States

Information
- School type: Public high school
- School district: Denver City Independent School District
- Principal: Bruce Patterson (1st year)
- Teaching staff: 36.80 (FTE)
- Grades: 9-12
- Enrollment: 512 (2023-2024)
- Student to teacher ratio: 13.91
- Colors: Red, white, and gray
- Athletics conference: UIL Class 3A
- Mascot: Mustang/Fillie
- Website: Denver City High School

Denver City High School is a public high school located in Denver City, Texas; it is classified as a 3A school by the UIL and is in the Denver City Independent School District located in southern Yoakum County. In 2013, the school was rated "Met Standard" by the Texas Education Agency.

== History ==
The school has been a Texas Education Agency Recognized Campus and was a United States Department of Education Blue Ribbon School in 2007. The student athletes there have excelled in football, basketball, golf, tennis, track, baseball, softball, and volleyball. The UIL academic team has won two consecutive district championships and the UIL region I championship in 2011.

== Athletics ==
Denver City High School participates in cross-country running, football, volleyball, basketball, powerlifting, golf, tennis, color guard, track and field, baseball, and softball.

=== State titles ===
- Football
  - 1960(2A)

==== State finalists ====
- Boys' Basketball
  - 1953 (1A)
- Volleyball
  - 1972 (2A), 1973 (2A), 1976 (2A)

== Band ==
- UIL Marching Band state champions
  - 1983 (3A), 1985 (3A), 1986 (3A), 1988 (3A), 1989 (3A)

== Theater ==
- One Act Play
  - 1971 (2A)

== Notable alumni ==
- Chip Bennet, former college football player
