= Howe High School (Texas) =

Coordinates: 33.5284°N 96.6091°W

Location
- 200 E Ponderosa; Howe, Texas 75459-4554; United States

Information
- School type: Public high school
- School district: Howe Independent School District
- Principal: Andrew Cellars
- Teaching staff: 32.75 (FTE)
- Grades: 9-12
- Enrollment: 365 (2023–2024)
- Student to teacher ratio: 11.15
- Colors: Black & White
- Athletics conference: UIL Class 3A
- Mascot: Bulldog
- Website: www.howeisd.net

Howe High School is a public high school located in Howe, Texas (USA) and classified as a 3A school by the UIL. It is part of the Howe Independent School District located in central Grayson County just south of Sherman. In 2015, the school was rated "Met Standard" by the Texas Education Agency.

== Athletics ==
The Howe Bulldogs compete in the following sports -

Cross Country, Volleyball, Football, Basketball, Powerlifting, Golf, Tennis, Track, Softball & Baseball

== Band ==
- Marching Band State Champions -
  - 1980(2A), 1995(2A), 1997(2A)

1981 5th place finalist

1982 2nd place finalist

1983 2nd place finalist

1986 5th place finalist

1990 3rd place finalist

1991 5th place finalist

1993 5th place finalist

1999 2nd place finalist

2001 2nd place finalist

2009 5th place finalist

2013 10th place finalist

2017 9th place finalist

2021 9th place finalist

2023 7th place finalist

2024 11th place finalist

2025 7th place finalist
