= Pecos County, Texas =

County in Texas, United States

- County
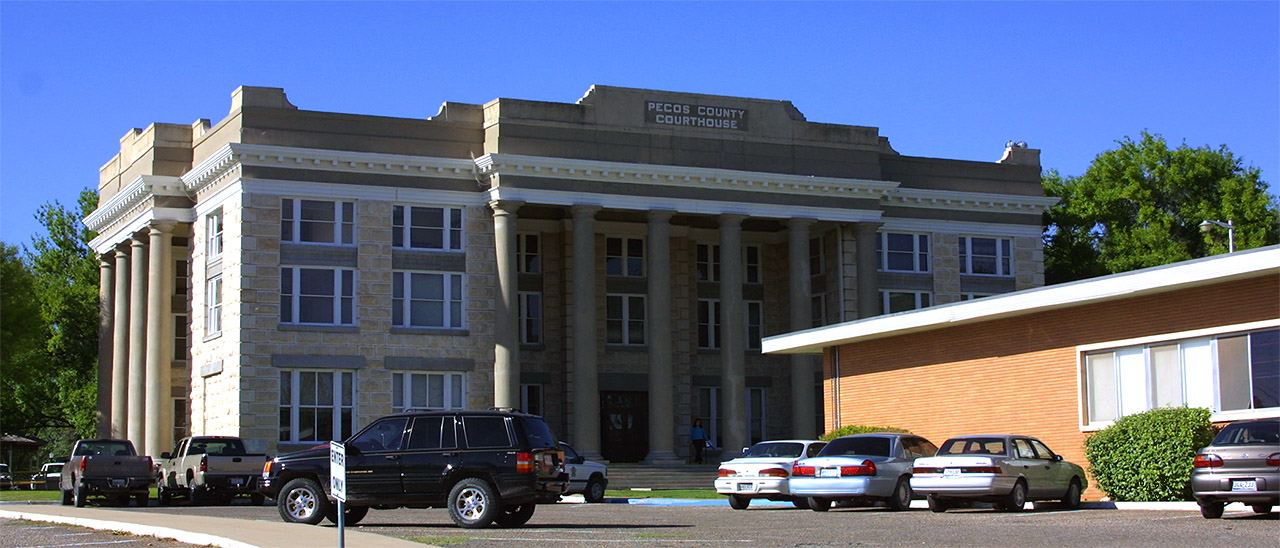
- Pecos County Courthouse in Fort Stockton

- Location within the U.S. state of Texas
- Coordinates: 30°47′N 102°43′W
- Country: United States
- State: Texas
- Founded: 1875
- Named for: Pecos River
- Seat: Fort Stockton
- Largest city: Fort Stockton

Area
  - Total: 4,765 sq mi (12,340 km^{2})
  - Land: 4,764 sq mi (12,340 km^{2})
  - Water: 1.0 sq mi (2.6 km^{2}) 0.02%

Population (2020)
  - Total: 15,193
  - Estimate (2025): 14,560 ▼
  - Density: 3.189/sq mi (1.231/km^{2})
- Time zone: UTC−6 (Central)
  - Summer (DST): UTC−5 (CDT)
- Congressional district: 23rd
- Website: www.co.pecos.tx.us

Pecos County (/ˈpeɪkəs/ PAY-kəs) is a county located in the U.S. state of Texas. As of the 2020 census, its population was 15,193. The county seat is Fort Stockton. The county was created in 1871 and organized in 1875. It is named for the Pecos River. It is one of the nine counties that comprise the Trans-Pecos region of West Texas.

== History ==
=== Native Americans ===
Archeological digs at Tunas Peak uncovered prehistoric hunter-gatherer artifacts. Fourteen clusters of stones interpreted as wickiup and tipi rings indicate human habitation. A ring midden in the camp provided a radiocarbon date of 1300 AD. Archeological finds along Tunas Creek include a burial site, pictographs, and artifacts; one is a possible modified Langtry projectile point (2,000 BC to 700–800 AD).

=== Early routes ===
The Comanche Trail crossed Pecos County near Horsehead Crossing and through Comanche Springs. The Chihuahua Trail connecting Mexico's state of Chihuahua with Santa Fe, New Mexico, brought travelers through the area by Comanche Springs about 1840.

A United States Army outpost, Fort Stockton, was established in 1858 at Comanche Springs to guard the San Antonio-El Paso Mail. That same year, the Butterfield Overland Mail began service to the army post.

=== County established and growth ===
The town of Fort Stockton began near the Fort Stockton army post at Comanche Springs as St. Gaul, Texas, but was renamed Fort Stockton in 1880. Pecos County was established by the Texas Legislature in 1871 originally out of Presidio County. In 1871, Pecos County was organized and St. Gaul was named the county seat. About 1,100 people were living in the county that year. By 1890, the county had 227 cattle and 150 sheep, and 1,300 acres (5.3 km^{2}) were planted in corn. By 1900, the area's economy had become almost completely dominated by cattle and sheep ranching, though plots of wheat, rye, corn, and oats were grown. Around 1900, a small settlement known as Sheffield sprang up in eastern Pecos County on land owned by Will Sheffield; it served as a supply point for the surrounding ranches. In 1913, construction of the Kansas City, Mexico and Orient Railway across Pecos County caused a boom in land speculation and community growth, as did irrigation projects along the Pecos River. The town of Girvin, named for rancher John H. Girvin, grew around a train stop on the Kansas City, Mexico and Orient Railway that served as a cattle-shipping point. Construction of Texas State Highway 290 linking Fort Stockton to Big Bend National Park gave a boost to tourism. In the 1980s, the economy of Pecos County continued to be based on farming, ranching, oil and gas production, and tourism. The Yates Oil Field in Crockett, and Pecos counties in 1927 resulted in a financial boom period for the county. Towns such as Red Barn, Iraan (combination of the names Ira and Ann Yates), and Bakersfield rose up in response to oil-related employment opportunities. The population of the county more than doubled during the 1920s. Oil production helped to stabilize the local economy.

=== Alley Oop and Paisano Pete ===
The town of Iraan, Texas, prides itself on being the birthplace of cartoon caveman Alley Oop, when creator V.T. Hamlin worked in the oilfields. Although first published in the Des Moines Register in 1932, Hamlin claimed to have originated the idea while he watched dinosaur bones being dug up by oil equipment. Visitors to Iraan can visit the Alley Oop Museum found on Alley Oop Lane. Fort Stockton pays tribute to the agile roadrunner with its Paisano Pete the Roadrunner statue.

== Geography ==
According to the U.S. Census Bureau, the county has a total area of 4,765 square miles (12,340 km^{2}), of which 1.0 square mile (2.6 km^{2}) (0.02%) is covered by water. It is the second-largest county by area in Texas.

=== Yates Oil Field ===
Pecos County is home to one of the largest oil fields in the United States, the Yates Oil Field, which is in the extreme eastern part of the county, along the Pecos River. The field covers about 41 sq mi (110 km^{2}) near the town of Iraan. Discovered in 1926, it has produced over a billion barrels of oil, and most industry estimates give it more than another billion in recoverable reserves. The Yates Oil Field was one of the first giant fields to be found in the Permian Basin.

=== Major highways ===
- Interstate 10
  - Interstate 10 Business (Fort Stockton)
- U.S. Highway 67
- U.S. Highway 90
- U.S. Highway 190
- U.S. Highway 285
- U.S. Highway 385
- State Highway 18
- State Highway 290
- State Highway 349
- Loop 293
- Spur 194

=== Adjacent counties ===
- Ward County (north)
- Crane County (north)
- Crockett County (east)
- Terrell County (south)
- Brewster County (south)
- Jeff Davis County (west and south)
- Reeves County (northwest)

== Demographics ==
Historical population
| Census | Pop. | Note | %± |
|---|---|---|---|
| 1880 | 1,807 | | — |
| 1890 | 1,326 | | −26.6% |
| 1900 | 2,360 | | 78.0% |
| 1910 | 2,071 | | −12.2% |
| 1920 | 3,857 | | 86.2% |
| 1930 | 7,812 | | 102.5% |
| 1940 | 8,185 | | 4.8% |
| 1950 | 9,939 | | 21.4% |
| 1960 | 11,957 | | 20.3% |
| 1970 | 13,748 | | 15.0% |
| 1980 | 14,618 | | 6.3% |
| 1990 | 14,675 | | 0.4% |
| 2000 | 16,809 | | 14.5% |
| 2010 | 15,507 | | −7.7% |
| 2020 | 15,193 | | −2.0% |
| 2025 (est.) | 14,560 | ▼ | −4.2% |
U.S. Decennial Census; 1850–2010 2010–2014

=== Racial and ethnic composition ===
Pecos County, Texas – Racial and ethnic composition Note: the US Census treats Hispanic/Latino as an ethnic category. This table excludes Latinos from the racial categories and assigns them to a separate category. Hispanics/Latinos may be of any race.
| Race / Ethnicity (NH = Non-Hispanic) | Pop 1980 | Pop 1990 | Pop 2000 | Pop 2010 | Pop 2020 | % 1980 | % 1990 | % 2000 | % 2010 | % 2020 |
|---|---|---|---|---|---|---|---|---|---|---|
| White alone (NH) | 7,386 | 6,209 | 5,607 | 4,326 | 3,473 | 50.53% | 42.31% | 33.36% | 27.90% | 22.86% |
| Black or African American alone (NH) | 67 | 51 | 700 | 528 | 505 | 0.46% | 0.35% | 4.16% | 3.40% | 3.32% |
| Native American or Alaska Native alone (NH) | 25 | 31 | 32 | 57 | 33 | 0.17% | 0.21% | 0.19% | 0.37% | 0.22% |
| Asian alone (NH) | 35 | 21 | 73 | 74 | 143 | 0.24% | 0.14% | 0.43% | 0.48% | 0.94% |
| Native Hawaiian or Pacific Islander alone (NH) | x | x | 0 | 5 | 0 | x | x | 0.00% | 0.03% | 0.00% |
| Other race alone (NH) | 6 | 32 | 12 | 17 | 35 | 0.04% | 0.22% | 0.07% | 0.11% | 0.23% |
| Mixed race or Multiracial (NH) | x | x | 123 | 70 | 159 | x | x | 0.73% | 0.45% | 1.05% |
| Hispanic or Latino (any race) | 7,099 | 8,331 | 10,262 | 10,430 | 10,845 | 48.56% | 56.77% | 61.05% | 67.26% | 71.38% |
| Total | 14,618 | 14,675 | 16,809 | 15,507 | 15,193 | 100.00% | 100.00% | 100.00% | 100.00% | 100.00% |

=== 2020 census ===
As of the 2020 census, the county had a population of 15,193. The median age was 37.5 years, with 23.8% of residents under the age of 18 and 14.1% aged 65 or older. For every 100 females there were 125.8 males, and for every 100 females age 18 and over there were 134.9 males age 18 and over.

The racial makeup of the county was 45.6% White, 3.7% Black or African American, 1.1% American Indian and Alaska Native, 1.0% Asian, <0.1% Native Hawaiian and Pacific Islander, 25.9% from some other race, and 22.7% from two or more races. Hispanic or Latino residents of any race comprised 71.4% of the population.

56.3% of residents lived in urban areas, while 43.7% lived in rural areas.

There were 4,916 households in the county, of which 36.7% had children under the age of 18 living in them. Of all households, 49.4% were married-couple households, 20.4% were households with a male householder and no spouse or partner present, and 24.6% were households with a female householder and no spouse or partner present. About 25.1% of all households were made up of individuals and 10.2% had someone living alone who was 65 years of age or older.

There were 5,795 housing units, of which 15.2% were vacant. Among occupied housing units, 70.1% were owner-occupied and 29.9% were renter-occupied. The homeowner vacancy rate was 1.7% and the rental vacancy rate was 14.8%.

=== 2010 census ===
As of the 2010 United States census, there were 15,507 people living in the county; 79.4% were White, 3.7% Black or African American, 0.8% Native American, 0.5% Asian, 13.5% of some other race, and 2.1% of two or more races. About 67.3% were Hispanic or Latino (of any race).

== Education ==
Public education in Pecos County is provided by three school districts: Buena Vista, Fort Stockton, and Iraan-Sheffield Independent School Districts.

=== Williams Regional Technical Training Center ===
Pecos County is home to the Midland College/Williams Regional Technical Training Center, located alongside Interstate Highway 10, in Fort Stockton. The center was built in 1996 through a joint effort by Midland College, and by leaders of Fort Stockton education, business, and government as a means to enhance higher education and workforce development in this part of West Texas. Fort Stockton and Pecos County are part of the Midland College service area. After just four years, the facility, named in honor of Fort Stockton native and center donor Clayton Williams Jr. was doubled in size through fundraising and program development.

== Communities ==
=== Cities ===
- Fort Stockton (county seat)
- Iraan

=== Census-designated places ===
- Coyanosa
- Imperial
- Sheffield

=== Unincorporated areas ===
- Bakersfield
- Girvin

== Notable people ==
Oilman and rancher Clayton W. Williams Sr. served for 16 years as a Pecos county commissioner. His father, attorney Oscar Waldo Williams, earlier served a decade as Pecos county judge. Clayton Williams Jr. the 1990 Republican gubernatorial nominee, was reared in Fort Stockton.

== Politics ==
Prior to the 1970s, Pecos County had a "Solid South" Democratic voting tendency at the presidential level, making exceptions for Republicans Warren G. Harding and Dwight D. Eisenhower. Today, Pecos is a strongly Republican county, with the last Democratic presidential candidate to win it being Bill Clinton of Arkansas in 1996.

United States presidential election results for Pecos County, Texas
| Year | Republican | | Democratic | | Third party(ies) | |
| Year | No. | % | No. | % | No. | % |
|---|---|---|---|---|---|---|
| 1912 | 76 | 17.76% | 256 | 59.81% | 96 | 22.43% |
| 1916 | 96 | 19.35% | 394 | 79.44% | 6 | 1.21% |
| 1920 | 394 | 48.40% | 386 | 47.42% | 34 | 4.18% |
| 1924 | 192 | 29.00% | 440 | 66.47% | 30 | 4.53% |
| 1928 | 524 | 47.99% | 562 | 51.47% | 6 | 0.55% |
| 1932 | 180 | 12.43% | 1,261 | 87.09% | 7 | 0.48% |
| 1936 | 167 | 11.15% | 1,330 | 88.79% | 1 | 0.07% |
| 1940 | 332 | 17.25% | 1,583 | 82.23% | 10 | 0.52% |
| 1944 | 305 | 18.45% | 1,226 | 74.17% | 122 | 7.38% |
| 1948 | 317 | 17.60% | 1,430 | 79.40% | 54 | 3.00% |
| 1952 | 1,573 | 59.36% | 1,076 | 40.60% | 1 | 0.04% |
| 1956 | 1,425 | 60.20% | 931 | 39.33% | 11 | 0.46% |
| 1960 | 1,412 | 44.58% | 1,724 | 54.44% | 31 | 0.98% |
| 1964 | 1,393 | 40.11% | 2,068 | 59.55% | 12 | 0.35% |
| 1968 | 1,524 | 37.92% | 1,592 | 39.61% | 903 | 22.47% |
| 1972 | 2,419 | 73.10% | 847 | 25.60% | 43 | 1.30% |
| 1976 | 2,234 | 52.78% | 1,971 | 46.56% | 28 | 0.66% |
| 1980 | 2,723 | 61.96% | 1,602 | 36.45% | 70 | 1.59% |
| 1984 | 3,451 | 67.93% | 1,596 | 31.42% | 33 | 0.65% |
| 1988 | 2,483 | 55.67% | 1,960 | 43.95% | 17 | 0.38% |
| 1992 | 1,836 | 40.59% | 1,778 | 39.31% | 909 | 20.10% |
| 1996 | 1,730 | 43.89% | 1,816 | 46.07% | 396 | 10.05% |
| 2000 | 2,700 | 62.75% | 1,539 | 35.77% | 64 | 1.49% |
| 2004 | 3,167 | 71.52% | 1,242 | 28.05% | 19 | 0.43% |
| 2008 | 2,480 | 61.85% | 1,476 | 36.81% | 54 | 1.35% |
| 2012 | 2,512 | 60.53% | 1,591 | 38.34% | 47 | 1.13% |
| 2016 | 2,468 | 58.97% | 1,554 | 37.13% | 163 | 3.89% |
| 2020 | 3,215 | 68.80% | 1,382 | 29.57% | 76 | 1.63% |
| 2024 | 3,042 | 71.86% | 1,144 | 27.03% | 47 | 1.11% |

United States Senate election results for Pecos County, Texas1
| Year | Republican | | Democratic | | Third party(ies) | |
| Year | No. | % | No. | % | No. | % |
|---|---|---|---|---|---|---|
| 2024 | 2,817 | 68.01% | 1,206 | 29.12% | 119 | 2.87% |

United States Senate election results for Pecos County, Texas2
| Year | Republican | | Democratic | | Third party(ies) | |
| Year | No. | % | No. | % | No. | % |
|---|---|---|---|---|---|---|
| 2020 | 3,081 | 67.43% | 1,376 | 30.12% | 112 | 2.45% |

Texas Gubernatorial election results for Pecos County
| Year | Republican | | Democratic | | Third party(ies) | |
| Year | No. | % | No. | % | No. | % |
|---|---|---|---|---|---|---|
| 2022 | 2,548 | 69.20% | 1,043 | 28.33% | 91 | 2.47% |

== See also ==
- List of museums in West Texas
- National Register of Historic Places listings in Pecos County, Texas
- Recorded Texas Historic Landmarks in Pecos County
