= Buena Vista Independent School District =

School district in Texas

Coordinates: 31.275°N 102.694°W

Buena Vista Independent School District is a public school district based in the community of Imperial, Texas, United States.

The district's Buena Vista School serves students in prekindergarten through grade 12.

In 2009, the school district was rated "academically acceptable" by the Texas Education Agency.

== Special programs ==
=== Athletics ===
Buena Vista High School plays six-man football.

== See also ==
- List of school districts in Texas
