= Rankin, Texas =

City in and county seat of Upton County, Texas, United States

- City
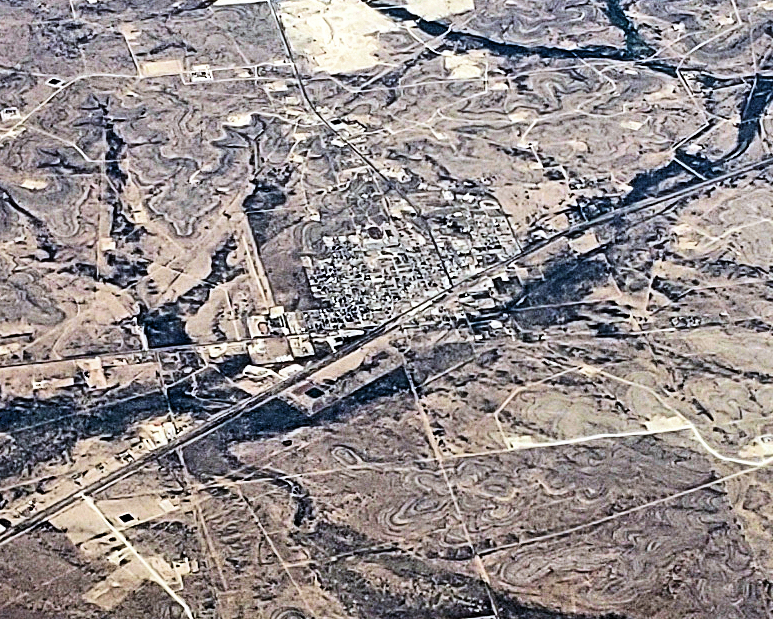
- Aerial photo of the city

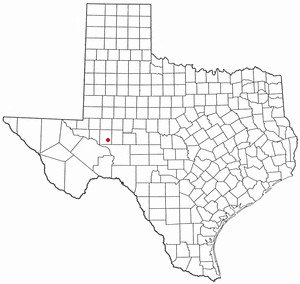
- Location of Rankin, Texas

- Coordinates: 31°13′28″N 101°56′27″W
- Country: United States
- State: Texas
- County: Upton

Area
  - Total: 1.05 sq mi (2.73 km^{2})
  - Land: 1.05 sq mi (2.73 km^{2})
  - Water: 0 sq mi (0.00 km^{2})
- Elevation: 2,516 ft (767 m)

Population (2020)
  - Total: 780
  - Density: 740/sq mi (290/km^{2})
- Time zone: UTC-6 (Central (CST))
  - Summer (DST): UTC-5 (CDT)
- ZIP code: 79778
- Area code: 432
- FIPS code: 48-60668
- GNIS feature ID: 1366016
- Website: www.cityofrankintx.org

Rankin is a city in and the county seat of Upton County, Texas, United States. Its population was 780 at the 2020 census. It is named after F.E. Rankin, a local rancher. As of 2020, 3,308 people live in Upton County, with McCamey being the only larger town. During the early 20th century, the town grew due to the discovery of oil in the nearby Yates Oil Field. Following a second oil boom in the '80s, the town had a decline in its economy and population.

== Geography ==
Rankin is located at 31°13′28″N 101°56′27″W (31.224412, −101.940866). The major highways in the city are U.S. Route 67, Texas State Highway 329, and Texas State Highway 349.

According to the United States Census Bureau, the city has a total area of 1.1 square miles (2.7 km^{2}), all land.

== History ==
The town was founded in 1911, and the post office was built a year later. In 1921, this still-tiny community based around the ranching industry was designated the county seat. Rankin was served by the Kansas City, Mexico and Orient Railway.

The discovery of the Yates Oil Field in adjacent Pecos County in 1926 converted Rankin into a boom town. Since Rankin was the nearest settlement on a rail line, it became the center for the oil-services industry for the nearby oil fields. During the Great Depression, the population declined as the price of oil fell, and as workers moved away to work in newly discovered fields in East Texas and elsewhere, but a secondary boom occurred in the 1940s with the discovery of the nearby Benedum Oil Field. A hospital, three new schools, and a library date from this period. The population has gradually fallen since its secondary peak of 1,278 in 1980.

In 1990, the Confederate Air Force (later Commemorative Air Force) filmed a famous "Don't Mess with Texas" advertising campaign near Rankin using the B-17G Sentimental Journey of Airbase Arizona in Mesa, Arizona.

== Demographics ==
Historical population
Census	Pop.	Note	%±
1930	935		—
1940	672		−28.1%
1950	1,139		69.5%
1960	1,214		6.6%
1970	1,105		−9.0%
1980	1,216		10.0%
1990	1,011		−16.9%
2000	800		−20.9%
2010	778		−2.7%
2020	780		0.3%
U.S. Decennial Census

=== 2020 census ===
As of the 2020 census, Rankin had a population of 780, the median age was 36.9 years, 24.5% of residents were under the age of 18, and 14.5% were 65 years of age or older. For every 100 females there were 111.4 males, and for every 100 females age 18 and over there were 111.1 males age 18 and over.

0.0% of residents lived in urban areas, while 100.0% lived in rural areas.

There were 271 households in Rankin, of which 39.5% had children under the age of 18 living in them. Of all households, 50.2% were married-couple households, 22.1% were households with a male householder and no spouse or partner present, and 21.8% were households with a female householder and no spouse or partner present. About 26.2% of all households were made up of individuals and 12.2% had someone living alone who was 65 years of age or older.

There were 332 housing units, of which 18.4% were vacant. The homeowner vacancy rate was 5.6% and the rental vacancy rate was 10.8%.

Racial composition as of the 2020 census
Race	Number	Percent
White	580	74.4%
Black or African American	14	1.8%
American Indian and Alaska Native	4	0.5%
Asian	2	0.3%
Native Hawaiian and Other Pacific Islander	0	0.0%
Some other race	38	4.9%
Two or more races	142	18.2%
Hispanic or Latino (of any race)	257	32.9%

=== 2000 census ===
As of the census of 2000, 800 people, 308 households, and 231 families resided in the city. The population density was 752 inhabitants per square mile (290/km^{2}). The 374 housing units averaged 351.5 per square mile (136.2/km^{2}). The racial makeup of the city was 84.00% White, 2.50% African American, 0.50% Native American, 12.00% from other races, and 1.00% from two or more races. Hispanics or Latinos of any race were 26.88% of the population.

Of the 308 households, 32.5% had children under 18 living with them, 60.7% were married couples living together, 9.7% had a female householder with no husband present, and 25.0% were not families; 23.1% of all households were made up of individuals, and 14.6% had someone living alone who was 65 or older. The average household size was 2.58, and the average family size was 3.03.

In the city, the age distribution was 26.5% under 18, 8.5% from 18 to 24, 23.4% from 25 to 44, 26.3% from 45 to 64, and 15.4% who were 65 or older. The median age was 41 years. For every 100 females, there were 94.2 males. For every 100 females 18 and over, there were 92.2 males.

The median income for a household in the city was $36,528, and for a family was $41,250. Males had a median income of $36,250 versus $19,563 for females. The per capita income for the city was $16,047. About 15.7% of families and 16.9% of the population were below the poverty line, including 24.6% of those under age 18 and 15.3% of those age 65 or over.

== Education ==
The city of Rankin is served by the Rankin Independent School District. The district has two schools: Rankin High School (Red Devils) and James D. Gossett Elementary.

== Climate ==
Rankin experiences a semiarid climate with hot summers and cool winters.

Climate data for Rankin, Texas.
Month	Jan	Feb	Mar	Apr	May	Jun	Jul	Aug	Sep	Oct	Nov	Dec	Year
Record high °F (°C)	85 (29)	87 (31)	96 (36)	99 (37)	103 (39)	109 (43)	108 (42)	105 (41)	106 (41)	101 (38)	90 (32)	82 (28)	109 (43)
Mean daily maximum °F (°C)	59.2 (15.1)	64.0 (17.8)	73.0 (22.8)	81.3 (27.4)	87.4 (30.8)	93.4 (34.1)	95.4 (35.2)	93.5 (34.2)	87.4 (30.8)	79.1 (26.2)	68.5 (20.3)	61.0 (16.1)	78.6 (25.9)
Mean daily minimum °F (°C)	31.5 (−0.3)	35.0 (1.7)	43.6 (6.4)	52.8 (11.6)	59.9 (15.5)	66.9 (19.4)	69.8 (21.0)	68.4 (20.2)	62.8 (17.1)	53.0 (11.7)	41.8 (5.4)	33.6 (0.9)	51.6 (10.9)
Record low °F (°C)	3 (−16)	8 (−13)	10 (−12)	24 (−4)	36 (2)	45 (7)	58 (14)	57 (14)	42 (6)	27 (−3)	12 (−11)	6 (−14)	3 (−16)
Average precipitation inches (mm)	0.45 (11)	0.67 (17)	0.44 (11)	0.96 (24)	2.18 (55)	1.36 (35)	0.96 (24)	2.27 (58)	3.29 (84)	1.84 (47)	0.74 (19)	0.50 (13)	15.66 (398)
Source: The Western Regional Climate Center

== See also ==
- List of municipalities in Texas
