= Girvin, Texas =

Unincorporated community in Pecos County, Texas, United States

Coordinates: 31°03′47″N 102°23′19″W

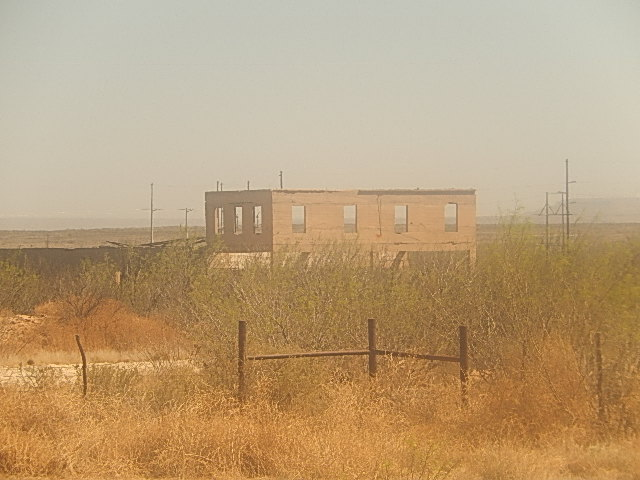
Abandoned structure in Girvin, April 2014

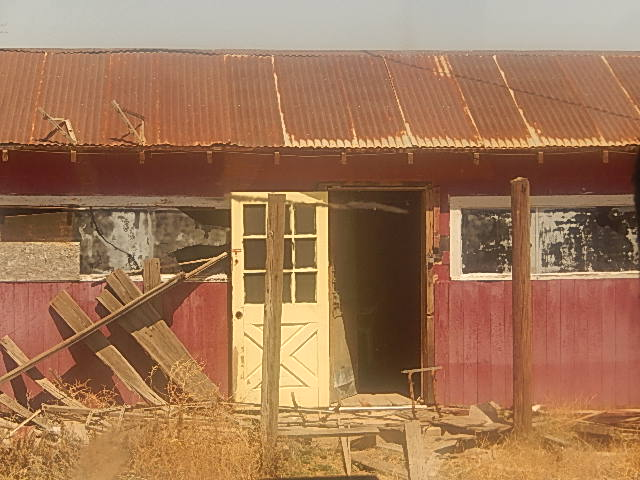
The former Girvin "Social Club", April 2014

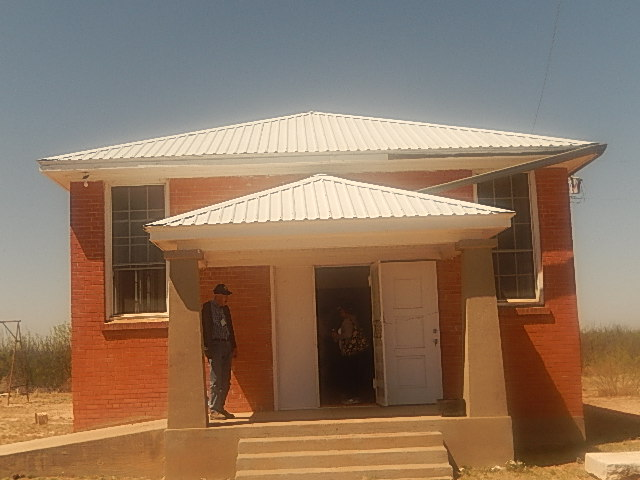
The former Girvin schoolhouse serves as a community meeting hall and voter precinct, April 2014

Girvin is a ghost town in Pecos County, Texas, United States. According to The Handbook of Texas, the community had an estimated population of 30 in 1963 and again in 2000.

== Description ==
The town is named for John H. Girvin, an area rancher. Girvin grew around a train stop on the Kansas City, Mexico and Orient Railway that served as a cattle shipping point. Other industries in the area such as oil, mining, and farming helped the town prosper.

In 1933, U.S. Route 67 bypassed Girvin, and eventually freight and passenger rail service to the town ended. The old railroad depot building was moved to the highway and became the since abandoned "Girvin Social Club" bar. The new town, also named Girvin, had a second life but is now too largely abandoned. There is an annual reunion of families from the area at the 1930s-era schoolhouse, which also serves as a meeting hall and voter precinct.

Public education in Girvin is provided by the Iraan-Sheffield Independent School District.
