= Sundown, Texas =

- City
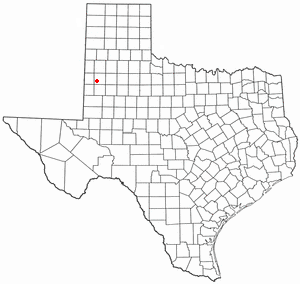
- Location of Sundown, Texas

- Coordinates: 33°27′25″N 102°29′18″W
- Country: United States
- State: Texas
- County: Hockley

Area
  - Total: 1.52 sq mi (3.94 km^{2})
  - Land: 1.52 sq mi (3.94 km^{2})
  - Water: 0 sq mi (0.00 km^{2})
- Elevation: 3,540 ft (1,079 m)

Population (2020)
  - Total: 1,283
  - Density: 843/sq mi (326/km^{2})
- Time zone: UTC-6 (Central (CST))
  - Summer (DST): UTC-5 (CDT)
- ZIP code: 79372
- Area code: 806
- FIPS code: 48-71060
- GNIS feature ID: 1369397
- Website: sundowntx.com

Sundown is a town in Hockley County, Texas, United States. The population was 1,283 at the 2020 census, a decrease from 1,397 at the 2010 census.

== Geography ==
Sundown is located at 33°27′25″N 102°29′18″W (33.457018, –102.488283).

According to the United States Census Bureau, the city has a total area of 1.5 square miles (3.9 km^{2}), all land.

== Demographics ==
Historical population
Census	Pop.	Note	%±
1950	1,492		—
1960	1,186		−20.5%
1970	1,129		−4.8%
1980	1,511		33.8%
1990	1,759		16.4%
2000	1,505		−14.4%
2010	1,397		−7.2%
2020	1,283		−8.2%
U.S. Decennial Census

=== 2020 census ===
As of the 2020 census, Sundown had a population of 1,283 people living in 443 households and 378 families. The median age was 36.3 years, with 30.3% of residents under the age of 18 and 12.9% aged 65 years or older. For every 100 females there were 97.1 males, and for every 100 females age 18 and over there were 91.0 males age 18 and over.

Of the 443 households in Sundown, 43.3% had children under the age of 18 living in them, 56.0% were married-couple households, 16.5% had a male householder with no spouse or partner present, 23.3% had a female householder with no spouse or partner present, 19.9% were made up of individuals, and 6.3% had someone living alone who was 65 years of age or older.

There were 501 housing units, of which 11.6% were vacant. The homeowner vacancy rate was 1.2% and the rental vacancy rate was 19.5%.

0.0% of residents lived in urban areas, while 100.0% lived in rural areas.

Racial composition as of the 2020 census
Race	Number	Percent
White	831	64.8%
Black or African American	16	1.2%
American Indian and Alaska Native	18	1.4%
Asian	0	0.0%
Native Hawaiian and Other Pacific Islander	0	0.0%
Some other race	185	14.4%
Two or more races	233	18.2%
Hispanic or Latino (of any race)	646	50.4%

=== 2000 census ===
As of the census of 2000, 1,505 people, 500 households, and 405 families resided in the city. The population density was 995.0 inhabitants per square mile (384.2/km^{2}). The 575 housing units averaged 380.1 per square mile (147.0/km^{2}). The racial makeup of the city was 79.60% White, 1.00% African American, 0.53% Native American, 0.07% Asian, 16.81% from other races, and 1.99% from two or more races. Hispanics or Latinos of any race were 39.34% of the population.

Of the 500 households, 43.6% had children under the age of 18 living with them, 67.4% were married couples living together, 10.4% had a female householder with no husband present, and 18.8% were not families. About 18.2% of all households were made up of individuals, and 8.6% had someone living alone who was 65 years of age or older. The average household size was 3.00 and the average family size was 3.42.

In the city, the population was distributed as 34.0% under the age of 18, 8.3% from 18 to 24, 27.4% from 25 to 44, 18.8% from 45 to 64, and 11.5% who were 65 years of age or older. The median age was 32 years. For every 100 females, there were 92.2 males. For every 100 females age 18 and over, there were 95.5 males.

The median income for a household in the city was $33,413, and for a family was $35,991. Males had a median income of $30,714 versus $21,146 for females. The per capita income for the city was $13,783. About 14.3% of families and 16.5% of the population were below the poverty line, including 20.3% of those under age 18 and 10.8% of those age 65 or over.

== Education ==
The community school district is Sundown Independent School District.
