= Imperial, Texas =

- CDP
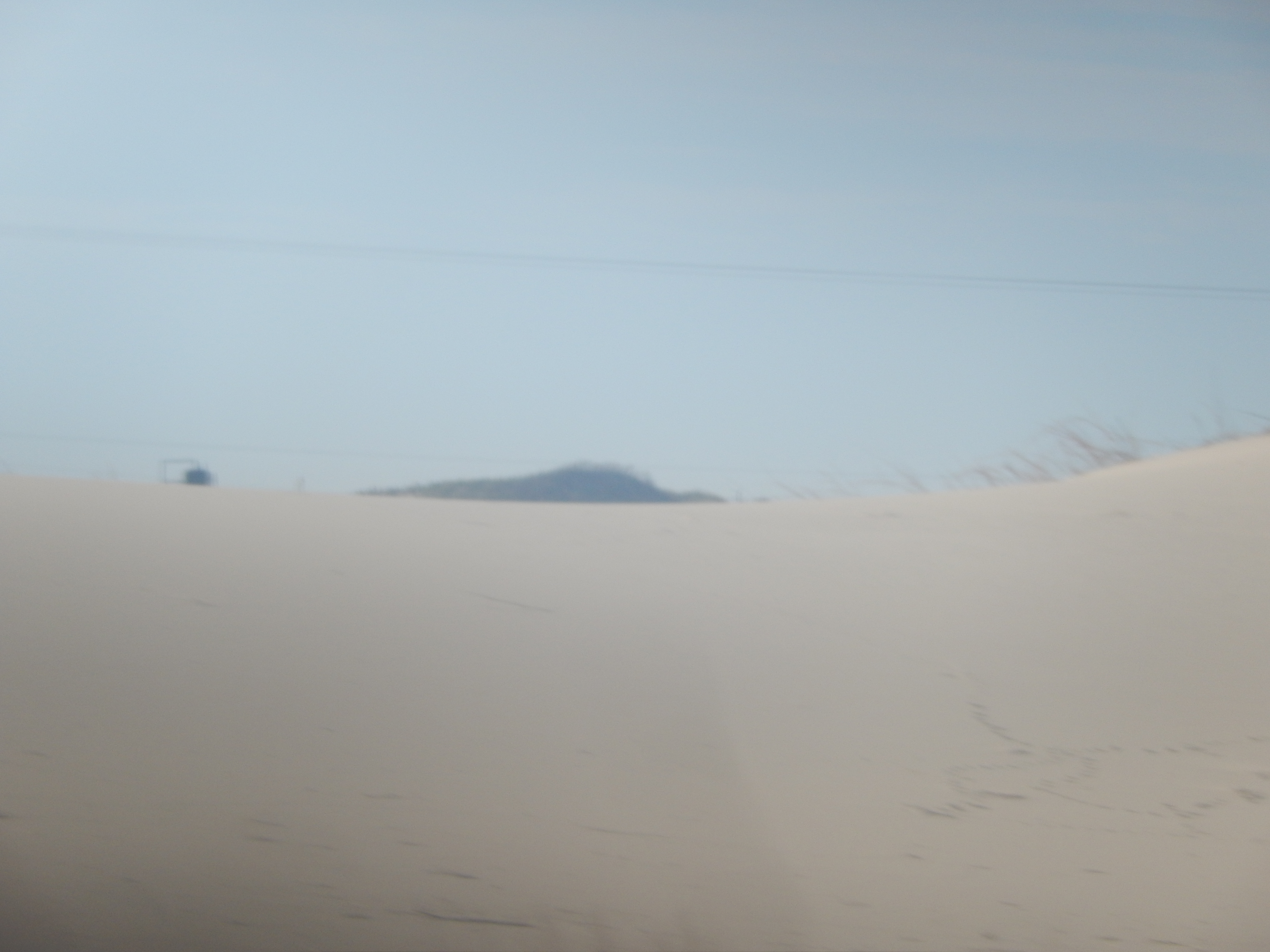
- Sand dunes north of Imperial, Texas

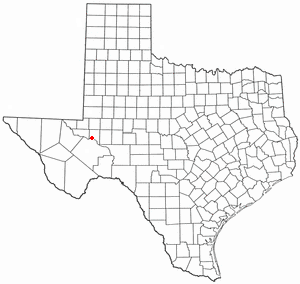
- Location of Imperial, Texas

- Coordinates: 31°16′19″N 102°41′45″W
- Country: United States
- State: Texas
- County: Pecos

Area
  - Total: 4.2 sq mi (11.0 km^{2})
  - Land: 4.2 sq mi (11.0 km^{2})
  - Water: 0 sq mi (0.0 km^{2})
- Elevation: 2,392 ft (729 m)

Population (2020)
  - Total: 294
  - Density: 69.2/sq mi (26.7/km^{2})
- Time zone: UTC-6 (Central (CST))
  - Summer (DST): UTC-5 (CDT)
- ZIP code: 79743
- Area code: 432
- FIPS code: 48-35828
- GNIS feature ID: 1359897

Imperial is a census-designated place (CDP) in Pecos County, Texas, United States. The population was 294 at the 2020 census.

== Geography ==
Imperial is located at 31°16′19″N 102°41′45″W (31.271968, -102.695799). It is situated at the intersection of Farm Roads 11 and 1053, four miles south of the Pecos River and approximately 30 miles northeast of Fort Stockton in northern Pecos County.

According to the United States Census Bureau, the CDP has a total area of 4.2 square miles (11 km^{2}), all land.

== History ==
The community was settled in the early 1900s. The site was originally known as Redlands from 1908 to around 1910, when it was renamed after California's Imperial Valley. A post office and school were opened in 1910 and a townsite was laid out on land owned by Benjamin E. Bush one year later. Water from the Pecos River was diverted and a small dam was built west of the community. An irrigation canal was constructed through Imperial in an attempt to attract new residents, but the area's water had a high salt content, which made farming unproductive. The population was approximately 25 in the mid-1920s, but had increased tenfold by 1949. Imperial's population approached 1,000 by the late 1960s with twenty-six businesses operating in the community. The number of inhabitants continued to decline during the latter half of the twentieth century.

== Demographics ==
Historical population
Census	Pop.	Note	%±
2000	428		—
2010	278		−35.0%
2020	294		5.8%
U.S. Decennial Census; 1850–1900 1910; 1920 1930 1940; 1950 1960 1970; 1980 1990 2000; 2010 2020

Imperial first appeared as a census designated place in the 2000 U.S. census.

=== 2020 census ===
Imperial CDP, Texas – Racial and ethnic composition Note: the US Census treats Hispanic/Latino as an ethnic category. This table excludes Latinos from the racial categories and assigns them to a separate category. Hispanics/Latinos may be of any race.
Race / Ethnicity (NH = Non-Hispanic)	Pop 2000	Pop 2010	Pop 2020	% 2000	% 2010	% 2020
White alone (NH)	252	140	106	58.88%	50.36%	36.05%
Black or African American alone (NH)	1	0	2	0.23%	0.00%	0.68%
Native American or Alaska Native alone (NH)	4	0	2	0.93%	0.00%	0.68%
Asian alone (NH)	6	0	1	1.40%	0.00%	0.34%
Native Hawaiian or Pacific Islander alone (NH)	0	0	0	0.00%	0.00%	0.00%
Other race alone (NH)	0	1	0	0.00%	0.36%	0.00%
Mixed race or Multiracial (NH)	7	0	8	1.64%	0.00%	2.72%
Hispanic or Latino (any race)	158	137	175	36.92%	49.28%	59.52%
Total	428	278	294	100.00%	100.00%	100.00%

=== 2000 census ===
As of the census of 2000, there were 428 people, 156 households, and 126 families residing in the CDP. The population density was 101.1 inhabitants per square mile (39.0/km^{2}). There were 245 housing units at an average density of 57.9 per square mile (22.4/km^{2}). The racial makeup of the CDP was 79.21% White, 0.23% African American, 0.93% Native American, 1.40% Asian, 14.02% from other races, and 4.21% from two or more races. Hispanic or Latino of any race were 36.92% of the population.

There were 156 households, out of which 34.6% had children under the age of 18 living with them, 68.6% were married couples living together, 7.1% had a female householder with no husband present, and 18.6% were non-families. 18.6% of all households were made up of individuals, and 8.3% had someone living alone who was 65 years of age or older. The average household size was 2.74 and the average family size was 3.09.

In the CDP, the population was spread out, with 28.7% under the age of 18, 7.9% from 18 to 24, 22.0% from 25 to 44, 27.1% from 45 to 64, and 14.3% who were 65 years of age or older. The median age was 40 years. For every 100 females, there were 102.8 males. For every 100 females age 18 and over, there were 117.9 males.

The median income for a household in the CDP was $24,375, and the median income for a family was $28,333. Males had a median income of $35,938 versus $20,938 for females. The per capita income for the CDP was $16,464. About 18.5% of families and 24.4% of the population were below the poverty line, including 30.6% of those under age 18 and 6.5% of those age 65 or over.

== Education ==
Imperial is served by the Buena Vista Independent School District and home to the Buena Vista High School Longhorns.
