= Yates Oil Field =

Oil field in the Permian Basin of west Texas

Coordinates: 30.8913°N 101.9415°W

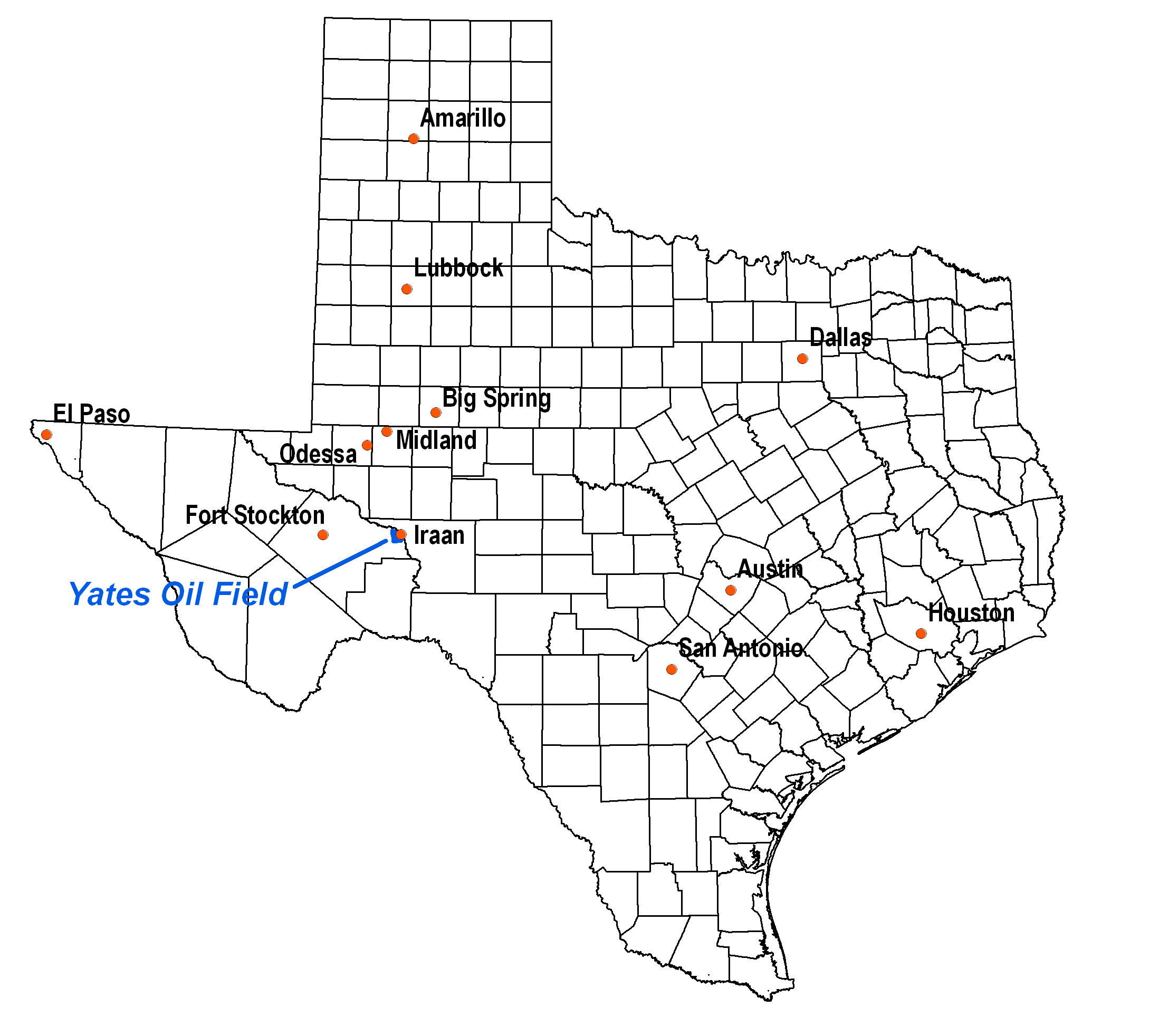
Location of the Yates Oil Field in Texas, showing major and nearby cities. Black lines are county boundaries.

The Yates Oil Field is a giant oil field in the Permian Basin of west Texas. Primarily in extreme southeastern Pecos County, it also stretches under the Pecos River and partially into Crockett County. Iraan, on the Pecos River and directly adjacent to the field, is the nearest town. The field has produced more than one billion barrels of oil, making it one of the largest in the United States, and in 1998 it remains productive, though at a diminished rate. Since fracking has exploded in the Permian Basin, the Yates field has seen very heavy activity in the past three years. Estimated recoverable reserves are still approximately one billion barrels, which represents approximately 50% of the original oil in place (OOIP).

== Setting ==
The productive area of the oil field covers approximately 26,400 acres (107 km^{2}), or over 41 square miles (110 km^{2}), in a roughly circular area in far eastern Pecos County, south, southwest and west of the town of Iraan. Texas State Highway 349 borders the field on the east, and U.S. Highway 190/193 borders the field on the north, passing through it going west on its way to Interstate 10, 14 miles (23 km) from Iraan. A small part of the field extends across the Pecos River into Crockett County, principally southeast of Iraan.

Terrain is hilly on the field itself, with some steep canyon walls and numerous mesas. The region is along the edge of the Edwards Plateau. Elevations range from 2,300 feet (700 m) along the Pecos River to over 2,800 feet (850 m) on the highest mesas. Average annual rainfall is about thirteen inches, and temperatures range from an average overnight low in January of 31 °F (−1 °C) to a July afternoon high of 96 degrees Fahrenheit. Native vegetation, where present – for much of the area is exposed rock – consists of desert shrubs, grasses, and scrubby live oaks. Drainage is primarily to the north and east, into the Pecos River, which flows south into the Rio Grande.

== Geology ==
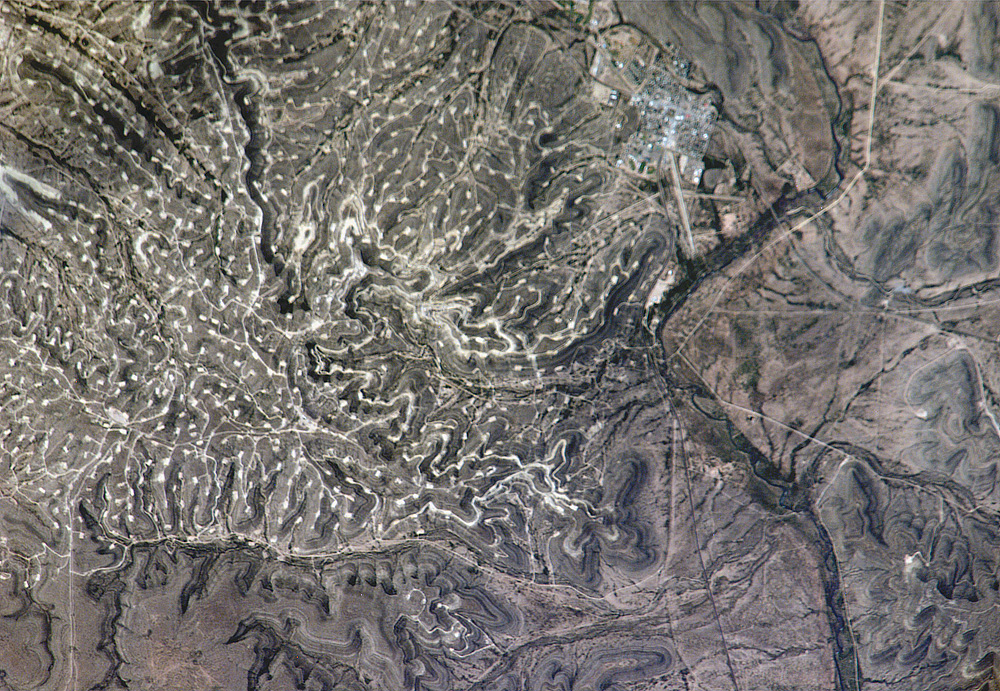
Satellite view of the Yates Oil Field. The town of Iraan, Texas is top center right, and the Pecos River crosses from north to south in the right third of the picture. This view is approximately 10 miles (16 km) across.

The Yates field is the southernmost of the large oil fields on the eastern rim of the Central Basin Platform in the Texas Permian Basin, the most productive petroleum-producing region in the continental United States. The Permian Basin is a geologic region, about 300 miles (480 km) long and 250 miles (400 km) across, which was downwarped during the Permian period. During this time it filled with water and became a sea, while the subsidence continued. Over tens of millions of years the sea filled with sediments – principally limestones and dolomites in the area of the Yates Field – and then as the sea evaporated, those sedimentary rocks were capped with a large layer of evaporites, such as potash and sea salt. These stratigraphic sequences are among the thickest collections of Permian rocks in the world. In areas where large anticlines formed, oil from deeper-lying source rocks was trapped in permeable rocks such as the limestone and dolomite underneath the impermeable cap of evaporite sediments.

In the Yates Field, the two richest oil-bearing rocks are the Grayburg Dolomite and San Andres Formation. The Grayburg is cavernous, having once been a tropical island with fresh water carving holes in the limestone, creating a karst terrain; the San Andres consists of fractured, dolomitized carbonates, and like the Grayburg contains copious free space in which petroleum accumulated over the eons. Some of these oil-filled caverns are as high as 21 feet (6.4 m). In addition to these two units, the Queen Formation, which contains interbedded sandstone, siltstone, and dolomite, and the complex Seven Rivers Formation, contain recoverable quantities of oil. Capping all four units is a salt layer in the Seven Rivers Formation.

== History ==
The land which the field underlies was owned by Ira and Ann Yates, ranchers in the hardscrabble Trans-Pecos region of West Texas (the town of Iraan is named for them: Ira+Ann). Yates had recently purchased the ranch, and was having difficulty making sufficient profit to pay the mortgage and taxes; on a hunch, he invited Michael Late Benedum's Transcontinental Oil Company to explore his land for oil. In 1926, a partnership consisting of Mid Kansas Oil Company (part of The Ohio Oil Company, the ancestor of Marathon Oil) and Transcontinental Oil, drilled an exploratory well, the Yates No. 1-A, on the Yates ranch into the San Andres formation approximately 1,000 feet (300 m) below ground surface, and hit a rich productive zone, producing a "gusher" – an uncontrolled spew of crude oil, under intense pressure, into the air. Lacking any other means of containment, the crew dammed a nearby draw to build a holding pond for the oil. Other wells drilled nearby also hit substantial quantities of oil – it seemed to be everywhere. Both Yates and the oilmen immediately recognized the significance of their find.

Unfortunately for the early development of the field, oil production and transportation infrastructure was lacking nearby. Early drillers needed huge holding tanks, pipelines, or rail sidings; until these could be built or supplied, no oil could be transported to buyers. Humble Pipe Line Co., an ancestor of Exxon Company, was the nearest to have any facilities at all – a pipeline that went to McCamey, in Upton County, about 25 miles (40 km) northwest of the production area. Humble began construction of a 55,000-barrel (8,700 m^{3}) storage tank to hold the oil, but even that was insufficient for the colossal quantities of crude that flowed from the field. Many of the early wells on the Yates Field were phenomenally productive; the first five wells, by spring 1927, together produced an average of 9,009 barrels per day (1,432.3 m^{3}/d), far more than could be stored or moved. The sixth well drilled, Yates 6-A, blew out due to extreme gas pressure, and 500 barrels per day (79 m^{3}/d) blew through the damaged well onto the ground, pooling in nearby canyons. Operators were able to retrieve most of it by damming the canyons and sucking the oil up with pumps.

Environmental standards were lax to nonexistent in the early days of the industry, and poorly constructed wells in the field often leaked crude from unsealed portions of the casing. Much of this oil migrated upwards, contaminating the Pecos River. Thousands of barrels per day were recovered by skimming the river, as well as drilling shallow wells, above the capping geologic formation, capturing oil before it reached ground surface. Over 3 million barrels (480,000 m^{3}) of oil was eventually recovered, all from seepage from poorly cased wells.

Production from the field peaked in 1929, with a total production of 41 million barrels (6,500,000 m^{3}) of oil. That year also saw the spudding of well Yates 30-A, which blew out with the spectacular flow of 8,528 barrels (1,355.8 m^{3}) per hour, and over 200,000 in a day, setting the world record; even the Lakeview Gusher at the Midway-Sunset field in California, which spewed a total of approximately 9 million barrels (1,400,000 m^{3}) in its 18-month uncontrolled run, only attained half of that daily flow rate. Because of the high production rate from the field and lack of storage and transport, the State of Texas Railroad Commission – the entity that oversees petroleum production – required a proration of the field for the first time in Texas history. Under this rule, all operators were given an equal share in the pipeline outlet based on what their wells could produce, based on the total field production. Additionally, operators were restricted in the depth they could drill into the prolific reservoir, to give each an equal advantage.

When the field was discovered, an instant boomtown sprung up in the form of tents and shanties around a red barn on the Yates Ranch, about three miles (5 km) south of present-day Iraan. This town, unsurprisingly named Redbarn, acquired a post office, general store, hotel, filling station, and restaurant, but never had a permanent population greater than 75. Ira Yates, owner of the ranch and oil field, donated 152 acres (0.62 km^{2}) of his land for the townsite of Iraan, which town survives to the present day. Redbarn was abandoned in 1952.

The two major early operators of the field, Ohio Oil and Mid-Kansas, merged in 1962 to form Marathon Oil, which ran the field until 2003. By 1966 production had diminished due to depletion of many of the major reservoirs, and between 1968 and 1972 Marathon operated a waterflooding program on the west side of the field, along with a CO_{2}-injection regime. Both of these enhanced recovery technologies increased pressure in the field, allowing increased oil recovery, which approximately doubled as a result. In the late 1970s, production again dropped, and Marathon commenced another waterflood project, this time followed closely by a pattern polymer flood. The polymer flood was ended in 1989. The 1 billionth barrel of oil was produced on January 11, 1985. Between 1985 and 1991, Marathon injected more CO_{2} into the central, eastern, and northern parts of the field; all of these activities improved production.

In 1992 there were 1,100 active production wells, along with 57 injection wells. Careful study of the fractured nature of the oil-bearing geologic units allowed operators to shut down almost 400 of the least efficient wells without diminishing the overall output of the field.

The current operator of the field is Kinder Morgan Energy Partners, who acquired it from Marathon Oil in 2003. Currently there are over 360 productive oil wells.
