= Iraan-Sheffield Independent School District =

School district in Texas

Iraan-Sheffield Independent School District is a public school district based in Iraan, Texas, United States.

In addition to Iraan, the district serves the communities of Sheffield and Bakersfield.

Iraan-Sheffield ISD has three campuses:

- Iraan High School (grades 9-12)
- Iraan Junior High School (grades 6-8)
- Iraan Elementary School (prekindergarten-grade 5)

In 2009, the school district was rated "recognized" by the Texas Education Agency.

In 2021, during the COVID-19 pandemic in Texas, the district closed after five days of classes as the COVID-19 rate was too high. The district planned to reopen on August 30.
