= Bakersfield, Texas =

Unincorporated community in Texas, US

Bakersfield is an unincorporated community in Pecos County, Texas, United States. According to the Handbook of Texas, the dispersed community had an estimated population of 30 in 2000.

== Geography ==
Bakersfield is located at 30°53′29″N 102°17′52″W. Its most visible feature is an Exxon station on Farm to Market Road 11 serving motorists traveling on Interstate 10. The community is located almost halfway between El Paso and San Antonio, nearly 275 miles from each.

== History ==
The community was established on September 10, 1929, by Bob Walker and Farris Baker after the discovery of oil in Taylor-Link field. The University of Texas owned the land and offered 10-year leases on lots and was said to be taking "25 per cent of the gross receipts." The community was named after J.T. Baker, a promoter with the UT lease who had hoped to develop the town site. Guy Rhinehart was the first person to settle there. A post office opened in the community that same year run by J.E. Davis. A hotel was moved to the location from Odessa, seventy miles away.

Bakersfield grew rapidly, and the population was estimated at just over 1,000 in 1930. This period of rapid growth was short-lived, however, as oil production and prices declined during the 1930s. The resident population had declined to 75–100 by 1931. Buildings were sold for the lumber or moved off site. The post office was closed in August 1940. By 1945, Bakersfield had an estimated population of 50 residents and two businesses. The number of inhabitants had further declined to around 30, a figure that remained unchanged throughout the latter half of the 20th century.

With wide uncertainty, on June 1st, 1990, a extremely violent tornado touched down and carved a 22-mile path near Bakersfield. It rolled 70-90 ton oil tanks and scoured the deep-rooted terrain of Southwestern Texas. The tornado reached an estimated width of 1.3 miles. This was given an official F4 rating on the Fujita Scale despite its heavy damages. This remains one of the most mysterious meteorological phenomena ever known, with some people saying its winds reached 300 mph (482 km/h) or more due to its violent destruction.

== Education ==
Public education in the community of Bakersfield is provided by the Iraan-Sheffield Independent School District.
