= Iraan, Texas =

- City
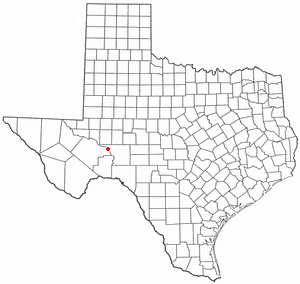
- Location of Iraan, Texas

- Coordinates: 30°54′49″N 101°53′55″W
- Country: United States
- State: Texas
- County: Pecos

Area
  - Total: 0.62 sq mi (1.60 km^{2})
  - Land: 0.62 sq mi (1.60 km^{2})
  - Water: 0 sq mi (0.00 km^{2})
- Elevation: 2,221 ft (677 m)

Population (2020)
  - Total: 1,055
  - Density: 1,710/sq mi (659/km^{2})
- Time zone: UTC-6 (Central (CST))
  - Summer (DST): UTC-5 (CDT)
- ZIP code: 79744
- Area code: 432
- FIPS code: 48-36128
- GNIS feature ID: 1360022

Iraan (/ˌaɪrəˈæn/ EYE-rə-AN) is a city in Pecos County, Texas, United States. Its population was 1,055 at the 2020 census. The city's name is a tribute to the town's founders, Ira and Ann Yates, who were owners of the ranch land upon which the town was built.

== History ==
Iraan was an oil boom town, and it developed quickly after the discovery of the gigantic Yates Oil Field, which is adjacent to the town on the southwest. The oil field was discovered in 1926, and the first buildings in town were basic housing and infrastructure for workers on the field, all built by the Big Lake Oil Company, which became Plymouth Oil Company, which was purchased by the Ohio Oil Company, then purchased by Marathon Oil Company, and owned today by Kinder Morgan. By 1927, the town included a school, and the post office appeared in 1928. The population of the town in 1930 was about 1,600. About 3 mi (5 km) south of Iraan was the oil boomtown of Redbarn, which appeared almost immediately after discovery of the oil field, before Iraan itself. It was a collection of tents and shanties in the immediate vicinity of Ira Yates's ranch. Yates donated 152 acres (0.62 km^{2}) of his ranch to the town of Iraan to encourage further development there. In 1952, the town of Redbarn, which never had a permanent population of more than 75, was finally abandoned.

One of Iraan's most famous residents was V. T. Hamlin, the creator of the comic strip Alley Oop. Originally from Iowa, he worked in Iraan during the oil boom period of the late 1920s, and he either got the idea for the strip or created its earliest drafts there; the strip was first published in 1932 in Des Moines. He moved back to Iowa in 1929 and later to Florida. A park in Iraan is named after the strip.

In 2021, Jason Rybolt, the CEO of Iraan General Hospital, stated that Iraan had a 42% positivity rate of COVID-19. Rosa Flores and Ashley Killough of CNN described the town as being hard hit by the COVID-19 pandemic in Texas in 2021.

== Geography ==
Iraan is located at 30°54′49″N 101°53′55″W (30.913511, –101.898614). According to the United States Census Bureau, the city has a total area of 0.6 square miles (1.6 km^{2}), all land. State Highway 349 and U.S. Highway 190 converge at Iraan. The Pecos River loops around the town to the north and east.

Iraan is the second-largest town (by population) in the second-largest county (by area) in the second-largest state in the United States, which is the second-largest country in North America.

=== Climate ===
According to the Köppen climate classification, Iraan has a semiarid climate, BSk on climate maps.

== Demographics ==
Historical population
| Census | Pop. | Note | %± |
|---|---|---|---|
| 1960 | 1,255 | | — |
| 1970 | 996 | | −20.6% |
| 1980 | 1,358 | | 36.3% |
| 1990 | 1,322 | | −2.7% |
| 2000 | 1,238 | | −6.4% |
| 2010 | 1,229 | | −0.7% |
| 2020 | 1,055 | | −14.2% |
U.S. Decennial Census

=== 2020 census ===
As of the 2020 census, Iraan had a population of 1,055, 391 households, and 291 families; the median age was 35.2 years, with 29.2% of residents under 18 and 10.9% at 65 or older.

For every 100 females, there were 97.9 males, and for every 100 females 18 and over, there were 104.1 males 18 and over.

None of the residents lived in urban areas, while 100.0% lived in rural areas.

Of the 391 households in Iraan, 44.2% had children under 18 living in them, 58.8% were married-couple households, 18.4% were households with a male householder and no spouse or partner present, and 17.4% were households with a female householder and no spouse or partner present. About 19.4% of all households were made up of individuals, and 7.2% had someone living alone who was 65 or older.

The city had 460 housing units, of which 15.0% were vacant. The homeowner vacancy rate was 3.4% and the rental vacancy rate was 15.3%.

Racial composition as of the 2020 census
| Race | Number | Percentage |
|---|---|---|
| White | 495 | 46.9% |
| Black or African American | 7 | 0.7% |
| American Indian and Alaska Native | 19 | 1.8% |
| Asian | 10 | 0.9% |
| Some other race | 267 | 25.3% |
| Two or more races | 257 | 24.4% |
| Hispanic or Latino (of any race) | 655 | 62.1% |

=== 2000 census ===
At the 2000 census, 1,238 people, 427 households, and 335 families resided in the city. The population density was 2,234 inhabitants per square mile (863/km^{2}). The 542 housing units averaged 978.2 per square mile (380.5/km^{2}). The racial makeup of the city was 92.00% White, 0.08% African American, 0.08% Native American, 6.22% from other races, and 1.62% from two or more races. Hispanics or Latinos of any race were 36.51% of the population.

Of the 427 households, 45.7% had children under 18 living with them, 70.3% were married couples living together, 4.2% had a female householder with no husband present, and 21.5% were not families. About 20.1% of all households were made up of individuals, and 7.7% had someone living alone who was 65 or older. The average household size was 2.90, and the average family size was 3.37.

Age distribution was 32.5% under 18, 6.9% from 18 to 24, 30.3% from 25 to 44, 20.4% from 45 to 64, and 9.9% who were 65 or older. The median age was 33 years. For every 100 females, there were 101.3 males. For every 100 females 18 and over, there were 101.0 males.

The median household income was $44,583, and median family income was $48,207. Males had a median income of $40,345 versus $22,396 for females. The per capita income for the city was $15,589. About 5.0% of families and 7.2% of the population were below the poverty line, including 9.3% of those under 18 and 7.6% of those 65 or over.

== Education ==
Public education in the city of Iraan is provided by the Iraan-Sheffield Independent School District.
