= Wink High School =

Location
- 200 Rosey Dodd Avenue; Wink, Texas 79789-0367; United States; 31.755088°N 103.152160°W

Information
- School type: Public high school
- School district: Wink-Loving Independent School District
- Principal: Kittie Gibson
- Staff: 26.14 (FTE)
- Grades: 7-12
- Enrollment: 211 (2023–2024)
- Student to teacher ratio: 8.07
- Colors: Black & Orange
- Athletics conference: UIL Class 2A
- Mascot: Wildcat/Lady Cat
- Website: Wink High School

Recorded Texas Historic Landmark
- Official name: Wink Junior High and High School
- Designated: 2012
- Reference no.: 17754

Wink High School is a public high school located in Wink, Texas, United States and classified as a 2A school by the UIL; it serves both Wink and Mentone in Loving County. It is part of the Wink-Loving Independent School District located in southwestern Winkler County and includes all of Loving County. In 2015, the school was rated "met standard" by the Texas Education Agency.

== Athletics ==
The Wink Wildcats compete in these sports:

- Boys' and girls' basketball
- Boys' and girls' cross-country running
- Football
- Boys' and girls' golf
- Boys' and girls' tennis
- Boys' and girls' track and field
- Girls' volleyball

=== State titles ===
- Football -
  - 1952(1A)
- Boys' golf -
  - 1957(B), 1959(B), 1960(B)
- Girls' golf -
  - 2015(1A)
- Boys' track -
  - 1959(B)
- Volleyball -
  - 1972(1A), 1974(1A)

== Notable alumnus ==
Roy Orbison – rock 'n' roll singer and songwriter, Rock and Roll Hall of Fame inductee

== Structure ==
In May 2018, a school bond was passed which included the demolition of the original Wink High School. In November 2018, despite the disapproval of the Texas State Historical Association, superintendent Scotty Carman and the Wink-Loving ISD school board voted to proceed with the demolition of the historic 90-year-old high school to make room for future development. Demolition began in January 2019. Note, on the bond election, 83% of the votes were for and 17% were against.

== See also ==
- Recorded Texas Historic Landmarks in Winkler County
