= Kermit High School =

Public secondary school in Kermit, Texas, United States

Location
- 1000 Tommy Thompson; Kermit, (Winkler County), Texas 79745; United States; 31.856103°N 103.082771°W

Information
- Type: Public secondary
- Motto: “We can, we will. All jackets, ALL IN”
- Established: 1928
- School district: Kermit ISD
- Authority: Texas Education Agency
- Superintendent: Denise Shetrer
- Principal: Brandon Enos
- Teaching staff: 27.76 (FTE)
- Grades: 9–12
- Student to teacher ratio: 13.69
- Campus: Semi-Urban (small city)
- Color: Maroon Gold
- Song: "Onward Kermit High School"
- Fight song: "Victory Song of KHS"
- Athletics conference: UIL Conference AAA
- Mascot: Yellow Jackets/Lady Jackets
- Newspaper: Yellow Jacket
- Yearbook: Sandstorm
- Feeder schools: Kermit Junior High School
- Website: khs.kermitisd.org/o/khs/

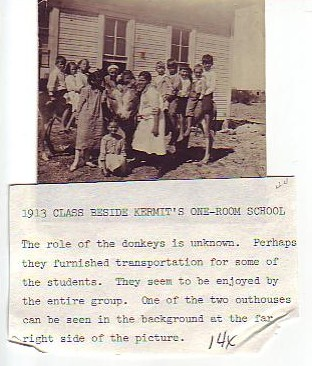
Kermit's first school in 1913

Kermit High School is the only public high school in Kermit, Texas, and is under the administration of Kermit Independent School District located in Winkler County. It is located at the corner of G.E. "Tommy" Thompson Boulevard (School Street) and North Avenue D in Kermit, Texas. As of the Spring of 2014, the school had an enrollment of 352 students attending grades nine through twelve. Kermit High School began the 2011–12 school year in its old facilities but moved to the new school facility on September 26, 2011, after the Kermit ISD Board of Trustees approved the new building on September 20, 2011. The school's mascot is the Yellow Jacket.

Kermit High School was established in 1928 as a public secondary school that offered classes in most fields of study. This first school had seven staff members and an enrollment of 115. The school initially only fielded three sports teams, girls basketball coached by Superintendent B.F. Meek, boys basketball coached by R.M. Cook, and a football team also coached by R.M. Cook. However, the football team did not actually compete until 1931 due to lack of essential materials. Shortly afterward in 1932, the school added tennis to its sports program. In 1934, Mr. Tommy Thompson came to Kermit as principal and coach along with many other staff members. Tommy Thompson would later serve as Superintendent of the district from 1948 to 1975 with much success, accomplishment, and an excellent reputation with statewide recognition as an outstanding administrator. Today, Kermit High School is organized into 20 departments/units, with a strong emphasis on science, math, social studies, and language arts. It is also well recognized for its extra-curricular organizations such as athletics and sports, band, choir, theater, and an active student council.

Student athletics, both organized and intramural, are an important part of student and alumni life at Kermit schools. The school's interscholastic competitive sports teams and the nineteen UIL state championships won in many different sports have helped to keep Kermit High School recognized statewide. Kermit High School fields eight men's and eight women's teams that compete in UIL District 4, Class AAA athletics and football UIL District 2 – Division I, Class AAA.

== History ==
=== Kermit's first school (1910 – 1925) ===
The first school house was built in Kermit between 1908 and 1910. It was a one-room school building that was approximately 25 by 40 feet in size and was taught by one teacher. In 1910, there were about 40 students who had enrolled in the school.

Coming to Kermit in 1923, Mrs. J. B. Walton succeeded Mrs. Gussie Richberg as teacher of the Kermit school. Mrs. Walton taught two years there and then two years in Monahans, and returned in 1928 for two more years in Kermit. In 1923, Mrs. Walton had only one student, Louise Baird who later became Mrs. Tommy Thompson. Mr. G.E. "Tommy" Thompson was Superintendent of Kermit Schools from 1948–1975. The teacher lived in the Ern Baird home, now known as the Mediallion Home. By the end of the year 1923, there were only seven students in the school.

During the early to mid-1920s, the enrollment of the school dropped rapidly due to a major drought that forced many people to leave Kermit and Winkler County and settle elsewhere. During this time, the population dropped so rapidly that by early 1926, there was only three residences and the court house that remained occupied in Kermit . In that same year, the nearest working telephone was located in Odessa, Texas 45 miles away. The only communication out of the city was mail shipped on horseback.

=== Establishment (1926 – 1929) ===
On August 9, 1926, the Commissioners Court, with J. B. Walton, George D. Hogg and W. W. Birdwell present, resolved itself into a County School Board. They appointed W. A. Priest and W. E. Baird as members and established a second school in the county at the Waddell Brother's Ranch. The Hay Flat School had formerly been consolidated with the Kermit School, leaving only one school in the county.

The old county court house served as a temporary school. After a few more students started answering roll call in 1927, a rickety-board school house was erected, which was occupied by Miss Helen Frame as the teacher. This structure was located on Campbell Street directly south and on the same lot as the existing Kermit ISD archives building. The current archives building once served as the cafeteria in the first public school building. In 1927, Hendrick No. 1, the name of the discovery well in Hendrick Field south of Kermit was completed and oil was discovered in Winkler County–the county that was to boom and bust, boom and bust, until prosperity came in with discovery of deep oil.

The first permanent Kermit High School building was opened in 1928, two years after Kermit ISD was founded. It was located on the ground where the rickety-board school house was first completed in 1927. In 1929, the enrollment of the school was counted at 115 students. Today, on the site were the first Kermit HS building was, there is nothing but an open field and a few small, school-owned buildings. In the early 1990s the building burned down, and the cause of the fire was suspected to be arson. However, the exact cause of the fire is still unknown. Kermit's first athletic field, "Baird Field" was built near that site in 1935 in honor of W.E. Baird Sr., longtime school board president.

=== The early years (1930 – 1949) ===
During the years between the start of the Great Depression and the big oil boom of the 1940s, many important events occurred in Kermit involving Kermit schools.

In 1937, additions enlarging the first Kermit High School building were completed to comply with growing demands for classroom space. The need was due to the discovery of oil in Winkler County in Henrick Field near Wink, Texas a decade earlier in 1927. These additions took up the lot where the old athletic field, Baird Field, was located. Therefore, a new athletic field needed to be built so schools sports programs could continue. The new athletic field was completed on September 23, 1937 on a plot of land J.B. Walton gave to the school district. At that time, it was commonly called "Kermit Field", but it was later named "Walton Field" in honor of Mr. J.B. Walton. During the 1936-37 school year, all football games were played away from home since the new athletic field was under construction. Also in 1937, the Kermit High Alma Mater "Onward Kermit High School", and the fight song "Victory Song of K.H.S. " were composed by Kermit's first high school band director, Mr. H.H. Copeland.

In 1937, Kermit High School had "one-unit" classes in the following: Ancient History, American History, Modern History, Plane Geometry, Advanced Arithmetic, General Science, Biology, Advertising, Commercial Law, Typewriting, Physical Education, Public Speaking, and Jr. Business Training. The school also had the following "two-unit" classes: Algebra, Spanish, Instrumental Music, and Secretarial Training. English was the only "four unit" subject. There were also "1-2 unit" classes offered by the school in each of the following: Civics, Economics and Occupations. That year, the school expected to add units in the following: Home Economics, Shop, Mechanical Drawing, and Journalism. In 1949, Kermit High School won her first UIL state championship. The champion was Maurine Fraser, and the event she won was journalism.

=== The oil boom years (1950 – 1979) ===
Kermit High School experienced success during the oil boom years. Kermit played in a Conference A Football State Championship as a nationally recognized school in 1950 under the leadership of Head Coach, Neal Dillman; won 15 UIL state championships across several athletic competitions; maintained its nationally recognized band programs under the direction of G.T. Gilligan, who directed the "Big K-Band" from 1944–1977, and R. Kirke McKenzie, who directed the band from 1977–1986; and enrolled over 750 students on a regular basis. G.E. "Tommy" Thompson served as Superintendent during the period.

In 1950, work began on a new Kermit High School building. The portion of the high school facility built during this stage of construction was the south hall which was commonly referred to as the "senior hall", the second story level above the south hall, the band hall, the auditorium, and the gym. This original section of the high school building was completed in 1952, and classes began in the new building that year. Throughout the 1950s the school competed in the UIL Conference A, AA and AAA levels. Such changes in conferences were due to the school's rapid increase in size due to the oil boom and the many improvements in transportation to the area.

In 1964, the middle hall of the high school was completed, and in the following year, the north hall of the high school was also constructed. These new additions were necessary to meet growing demand for classroom space resulting from the masses of people moving to Kermit in the 1960s due to the massive oil boom that was underway during that time period. The enrollment of Kermit High School was at least 800 students in 1966. Throughout the 1960s and 1970s, Kermit High School competed in the UIL Conference AA briefly, and mostly the Conference AAA level.

=== 1980s and 1990s ===
The final building addition to the existing old Kermit High School building was sought in 1982 and the construction was completed in 1983. This new addition included the extension of the middle hall through the south side of the building, a new computer lab, the existing front office, a new classroom, and the new upstairs library. In addition to the building extensions, the ceilings were lowered in order to install new heating and air conditioning systems. During the 1980s, the school competed in mainly the UIL Conference AAA level, and briefly, the UIL Conference AAAA level.

The enrollment of the high school throughout the 1990s was from 500-600 students consistently.

=== 2006 School bond issue ===
In August 2006, the Kermit ISD Board of Education passed a 33 million dollar school bond issue to demolish old, unused school facilities and to construct a new elementary school, "Kermit Elementary School" to replace both the aging East Primary and Purple Sage Elementary schools, and to demolish old, unused, and obsolete school facilities surrounding Walton Field which included both the old elementary school, which was being used as a field house, and the old intermediate school building. The voters of the City of Kermit passed the bond in November 2006. Included in the 2006 bond issue is the construction of a new Kermit High School building which was completed in September 2011. Work began on the new high school building in November 2009 after the demolition of the old East Primary Elementary School which stood on the lot in which the new school will occupy.

The new Kermit High School building and renovations include: 116,000 square feet (10,800 m^{2}) total of new space; a practice gym; a new, state-of-the-art competition gym; new, modern classrooms; renovations to the existing auditorium and band hall; and lastly, the construction of a fine arts center was to be added to the existing band hall and auditorium and these final additions would remain separate from the rest of the new high school building. The existing school building, except the existing auditorium and band hall, was to be demolished during the summer of 2011 but the demolition was postponed indefinitely after the Kermit ISD Board of Trustees decided that there was not enough funding left in the bond to demolish the building. After the demolition of the old school building, the construction of new parking lots, additions to the existing band hall and auditorium, and landscaping work are to be completed. Classes began in the new school building in the fall of 2011.

=== Present day ===
Today Kermit High School offers academic courses in all core academic subjects as well as numerous elective courses and career/technology prep classes. Kermit High School also works with Odessa College to offer certain dual-credit classes in which students can earn high school credits, while concurrently earning college hours. Classes at Kermit High School began the 2011–12 school year in its old facilities but moved almost all classes except welding and industrial technology to the new school facility on September 26, 2011 after the Kermit ISD Board of Trustees approved the new building on September 20, 2011. As of the spring of 2014, Kermit High School has an enrollment of 352 students. The school competes in the UIL Conference AAA level.

== Academics ==
- In the 2010 – 2011 school year Kermit High School was an "academically acceptable" campus according to the Texas Education Agency.

== Music and fine arts ==
Kermit High School has the following in the fine arts department. Band and Choir competitions are in the University Interscholastic League (UIL) Conference AAA Region 6, (Region-VI) and One-Act Play competitions are in the University Interscholastic League (UIL) Conference AAA, District 4.

- Band, "K-Band"
- Choir
- Theater Arts
- One-Act Play
- Art

== Athletics ==
Kermit High School participates in the following sports in the University Interscholastic League (UIL) Class AAA District Four (District 4-AAA) except for football, which is in District 2-AAA Division I, and Volleyball which is in District 4-AAA (excludes Crane High School).

- Football
- Volleyball
- Basketball
- Cross Country
- Track & Field
- Baseball
- Softball
- Powerlifting
- Tennis
- Golf

== State titles ==
=== State champions ===
Kermit High School's State Champions:

- 1949 Journalism, UIL Class A
- 1960 Boys Pole Vault, UIL Class AAA
- 1961 Boys Golf Individual, UIL Class AAA
- 1963 Boys Pole Vault, UIL Class AAA
- 1963 Boys Track, 440 Yard Dash Individual, UIL Class AAA
- 1964 Boys Track, Team, UIL Class AAA
- 1964 Boys Track, 220 Yard Dash Individual, UIL Class AAA
- 1964 Boys Track, 440 Yard Dash Individual, UIL Class AAA
- 1964 Boys Pole Vault, UIL Class AAA
- 1964 Boys Golf Individual, UIL Class AAA
- 1965 Volleyball, UIL Class AAA
- 1965 Boys 440 Yard Dash Individual, UIL Class AAA
- 1967 Boys Team Debate, UIL Class AAA
- 1968 Boys Poetry Interpretation, UIL Class AAA
- 1978 Tennis Boys Doubles, UIL Class AA
- 1979 Baseball, UIL Class AA
- 1979 Girls Golf, Team, UIL Class AA
- 1980 Girls Golf, Team, UIL Class AA
- 1980 Tennis Boys Doubles, UIL Class AA
- 1981 Calculator Applications Individual, UIL Class AAA
- 1982 Science Individual, UIL Class AAA
- 1982 Literary Contest Individual, UIL Class AAA
- 1982 Diesel Engine Repair, VICA (advanced to nationals)
- 1989 Boys Discus Throw (3 lbs. 9 oz.), UIL Class AAA
- 1992 Boys Individual Powerlifting 114 Pound Div., UIL Class AAA
- 1993 Boys Individual Powerlifting, UIL Class AAA

=== State finalists and runner-up's ===
Kermit High School State Finalists and Runner-Up's:

- 1950 Football, UIL Class A
- 1962 Boys Pole Vault, 2nd in State (tie), UIL Class AAA
- 1963 Boys Track, 2nd in State, UIL Class AAA
- 1963 Boys 220 Yard Dash, 2nd in State, UIL Class AAA
- 1964 Boys 440 Yard Relay, 2nd in State, UIL Class AAA
- 1966 Boys Pole Vault, 2nd in State, UIL Class AAA
- 1969 Boys High Jump, 2nd in State, UIL Class AAA
- 1979 Boys Golf, 2nd in State, UIL Class AA
- 1981 Girls Team Debate, 2nd in State, UIL Class AAA
- 1982 Girls Golf, 2nd in State, UIL Class AAA
- 1983 Science Individual, 2nd in State, UIL Class AAA
- 1986 Shot Put (AAA)
- 1989 Boys High Jump, UIL Class AAA, James Swisher
- 1989 Boys 200 Meter Run, UIL Class AAA, Billy Ray Thompson
- 1989 Boys Shot Put, UIL Class AAA, Duke Carter
- 1992 Girls Shot Put, 2nd in State, UIL Class AAA
- 1992 Girls Discus Throw, 2nd in State, UIL Class AAA
- 2000 Boys Shot Put, 2nd in State, UIL Class AAA
- 2006 Track and Field, UIL Class AA
- 2008 Boys Cross Country, 2nd in State, UIL Class AA

=== Other state titles/accomplishments ===
Kermit High School's other state titles and major accomplishments:

- 1955 Boys Tennis Doubles, UIL State Semi-Finalists, Class AAA
- 1957 Football, UIL State Quarter-Finalist, Class AAA
- 1964 Boys High Jump, 3rd in State, UIL Class AAA
- 1964 Boys Mile Run, 5th in State, UIL Class AAA
- 1965 Boys Golf Team, 3rd in State, UIL Class AAA
- 1968 Football, UIL State Quarter-Finalist, Class AAA
- 1968 Volleyball, 3rd in State, UIL Class AAA
- 1969 Boys 333 Yard Hurdles, 4th in State, UIL Class AAA
- 1970 Boys Discus Throw, 3rd in State, UIL Class AAA
- 1977 Girls Golf Team, 3rd in State (in 1st season), UIL Class AAA
- 1978 Football, UIL State Quarter-Finalists, Class AA
- 1978 Girls Golf Team, 5th in State, UIL Class AA
- 1980 Boys Golf, 3rd in State, UIL Class AA
- 1981 Football, UIL State Semi-Finalists, Class AAA
- 1983 Girls Golf, 3rd in State, UIL Class AAA
- 1985 Boys Pole Vault, 4th in State, UIL Class AAA
- 1986 Boys Shot Put, 4th in State, UIL Class AAA
- 1989 Girls Shot Put, 4th in State, UIL Class AAA
- 1990 Boys Shot Put, 3rd at State, UIL Class AAA
- 1990 Boys Discus Throw, 5th at State, UIL Class AAA
- 1993 TSSEC Outstanding Medium Ensemble
- 1993 TSSEC Vocal Mixed Chorus Region 6 Sweepstakes
- 1997 Boys Cross Country Individual, 4th at State, UIL Class AAA
- 1999 TSSEC Outstanding Vocalist
- 2000 Boys Powerlifting, 3rd in State, UIL Class AAA
- 2006 Boys Pole Vault, 5th in State, UIL Class AA
- 2007 Boys Cross Country, 4th in State, UIL Class AA
- 2007 Boys Cross Country Individual, 3rd in State, UIL Class AA
- 2007 Girls Powerlifting Individual, 3rd in State, UIL Class AA
- 2008 TSSEC Outstanding Medium Ensemble
- 2008 Girls Golf, 4th in State, UIL Class AA
- 2009 Boys Cross Country, 3rd in State, UIL Class AA
- 2009 Boys Cross Country Individual, 3rd in State, UIL Class AA
- 2009 Boys 1600 Meter Run 4th in State, UIL Class AA
- 2010 Girls Golf, 3rd in State, UIL Class AA
- 2010 TSSEC Outstanding B-Flat Clarinet Soloist
- 2011 Girls Powerlifting Individual, 3rd in State, UIL Class AA
- 2011 Girls Golf, 3rd in State, UIL Class AA
- 2011 Girls Golf, 4th Individual at State, UIL Class AA
- 2015 Boys 400m run 5th in State, UIL Class AAA
- 2016 Boys 400m run 3rd in State, UIL Class AAA

== Notable alumni ==
- William Frankfather – actor
- Jim "Razor" Sharp – two-time PRCA World Champion Bull Rider
- Gwyn Shea – 103rd Texas Secretary of State
- Doug Smith (composer)
- Barry B. Thompson – Former Chancellor of the Texas A&M University System, former President of Tarleton State University and West Texas A&M University, and former Vice President for Academic Affairs at Texas A&M University-Commerce.
- John Weaver (political consultant)
