= List of state highway spurs in Texas (200–299) =

Highway spurs in Texas

- Texas State Highway Spur marker

Highway names
- Interstates: Interstate Highway X (IH-X, I-X)
- US Highways: U.S. Highway X (US X)
- State: State Highway X (SH X)
- Loops: Loop X
- Spurs: Spur X
- Farm or Ranch to Market Roads: Farm to Market Road X (FM X); Ranch-to-Market Road X (RM X)
- Park Roads: Park Road X (PR X)

System links
- Highways in Texas; Interstate; US; State; Former; Toll; Loops; Spurs; FM/RM; Park; Rec

State highway spurs in Texas are owned and maintained by the Texas Department of Transportation (TxDOT).

== Spur 200 ==
State Highway Spur 200
- Location: Starr County
- Length: 0.050 mi (80 m)
- Existed: November 18, 1947–present

Spur 200 is located in Roma. It runs from US 83 southwest to Estrella Street and the Roma Texas Port of Entry at the Roma–Ciudad Miguel Alemán International Bridge. At a length of 0.05 miles (0.080 km), Spur 200 is the shortest spur route in Texas. The route is unsigned.

Spur 200 was designated on November 18, 1947, from US 83 along Bravo Alley to the international bridge. On September 28, 1988, the 0.1-mile (0.16 km) section from Estrella Street to the bridge was removed and returned to Starr County.

== Spur 201 ==
State Highway Spur 201
- Location: Harris County
- Existed: December 17, 1947–September 23, 1959

Spur 201 was designated on December 17, 1947, from an intersection with then-approved SH 146 near Black Duck Bay to West Goose Creek Street in Baytown. On September 23, 1959, the road was extended northeast to SH 146 and the route was changed to Loop 201 (now SH 146).

== Spur 202 ==
State Highway Spur 202
- Location: San Patricio County
- Length: 1.528 mi (2.459 km)
- Existed: November 18, 1947–present

Spur 202 is located in Gregory. It runs from SH 35 to US 181.

Spur 202 was designated on November 18, 1947, on the current route.

== Spur 203 ==
State Highway Spur 203
- Location: Presidio County
- Length: 0.770 mi (1,239 m)
- Existed: June 18, 1996–present

Spur 203 is located in Presidio. It runs from Bus. US 67 to Cibolo Creek.

Spur 203 was designated on June 18, 1996, on he current route along an old routing of US 67. The northern terminus of Spur 203 once connected to a bridge when the route was part of US 67; the bridge was removed in 1996 due to rerouting of US 67.

== Spur 206 ==
State Highway Spur 206
- Location: Cameron County
- Length: 3.463 mi (5.573 km)
- Existed: July 22, 1948–present

Spur 206 is located in Harlingen. It runs from I-69E/US 77 to Loop 499/FM 106.

Spur 206 was designated on July 22, 1948, from then-new US 77 to then-US 83 along an old routing of US 77. On March 14, 1961, the road was extended west 0.9 miles (1.4 km) along Harrison Avenue (former US 83) to US 83. On March 29, 1987, a 0.768-mile (1.236 km) section from Loop 448 (now Bus. US 77) to FM 106 was added. On August 4, 1988, by district request, the road was extended east 1.5 miles (2.4 km) to Loop 499.

== Spur 209 ==
State Highway Spur 209
- Location: Cherokee County
- Existed: January 27, 1948–February 23, 2006

Spur 209 was designated on January 27, 1948, from then-approved SH 204 southwest along Henderson Street to South Street in Reklaw. Spur 209 was cancelled on February 23, 2006, and returned to the city of Reklaw.

== Spur 213 ==
State Highway Spur 213
- Location: Wichita County
- Length: 0.601 mi (967 m)
- Existed: September 14, 1973–present

Spur 213 is located in Wichita Falls. It runs from SH 240 to SH 79.

Spur 213 was designated on September 14, 1973, on the current route along an old routing of SH 79.

== Spur 214 ==
State Highway Spur 214
- Location: Jefferson County
- Existed: October 18, 1948–January 7, 1987

Spur 214 was designated on October 18, 1948, from SH 73 near a Southern Pacific Railroad line north of Texas Company Reservoir southeast to SH 87 near a Gulf Company refinery. On January 7, 1987, Spur 214 was cancelled by district request and transferred to SH 82.

== Spur 215 ==
State Highway Spur 215
- Location: Jefferson County
- Length: 2.112 mi (3.399 km)
- Existed: October 18, 1948–present

Spur 215 is located in Jefferson County. It runs from SH 73 at Port Arthur Reservoir to SH 87 at Savannah and 16th Streets in Port Arthur.

Spur 215 was designated on October 18, 1948, on the current route.

== Spur 216 ==
State Highway Spur 216
- Location: Maverick County
- Length: 0.9 mi (1,400 m)
- Existed: July 26, 2012–present

Spur 216 is located in Eagle Pass. It runs approximately 0.9 miles (1.4 km) from US 277 to US 57.

Spur 216 was designated on July 25, 2012, on the current route as a renumbering of Spur 16.

=== Spur 216 (1948) ===
State Highway Spur 216
- Location: Somervell County
- Existed: November 23, 1948–September 6, 1949

The original Spur 216 was designated on November 23, 1948, in Glen Rose from then-new US 67 to then-old US 67. Spur 216 was cancelled ten months later and became a portion of SH 144 when it was rerouted; the former route of SH 144 became CR 312.

== Spur 217 ==
State Highway Spur 217
- Location: Midland County
- Existed: January 21, 1969–May 29, 1991

Spur 217 was designated on January 21, 1969, from FM 1788 northeast to Midland-Odessa Regional Air Terminal. On May 29, 1991, Spur 217 was cancelled and transferred to Loop 40.

== Spur 224 ==
State Highway Spur 224
- Location: Hill County
- Existed: February 25, 1949–January 26, 1958

Spur 224 was designated on February 25, 1949, in Penelope from FM 308 southeast 0.17 miles (0.27 km) along Commerce Street to an I&GN Railroad line. On January 26, 1958, Spur 224 was cancelled and transferred to FM 1888 (now FM 2114).

== Spur 226 ==
State Highway Spur 226
- Location: Kaufman County
- Length: 0.8 mi (1,300 m)
- Existed: July 27, 2017–present

Spur 226 is located in Kaufman County. It runs from US 80 south to SH 34 in Terrell.

Spur 226 was designated on July 27, 2017, on its current route, replacing a portion of Bus. SH 34 (the remainder was given to the city).

=== Spur 226 (1947) ===
State Highway Spur 226
- Location: Smith County
- Existed: January 22, 1947–August 29, 1990

The original Spur 226 was designated on January 22, 1947, from E. Front Street and Beckham Avenue in Tyler to an intersection with SH 64 and E. 5th Street. On August 28, 1958, the road was extended south to SH 110. At the same time, the route was signed, but not designated, as SH 155. Spur 226 was cancelled on August 29, 1990, as the SH 155 designation became official.

== Spur 228 ==
State Highway Spur 228
- Location: Potter County
- Length: 1.145 mi (1.843 km)
- Existed: May 22, 1959–present

Spur 228 is located in Potter County. It runs from US 287 to the south entrance of the former Amarillo Air Force Base (now Rick Husband Amarillo International Airport).

Spur 228 was designated on May 22, 1959, on the current route.

=== Spur 228 (1949) ===
State Highway Spur 228
- Location: Live Oak County
- Existed: May 8, 1949–October 16, 1956

The original Spur 228 was designated on May 8, 1949, from FM 188 (later corrected to FM 888) at Argenta northeast 0.2 miles (0.32 km) to the Bee County line. Spur 228 was cancelled on October 16, 1956, and redesignated as FM Spur 888 (now FM 3190).

== Spur 231 ==
State Highway Spur 231
- Location: Robertson County
- Length: 0.650 mi (1,046 m)
- Existed: April 30, 1975–present

Spur 231 is located in Robertson County. It runs from SH 6 in Benchley to Old Hearne Road.

Spur 231 was designated on April 30, 1975, on the current route. It was formerly part of SH OSR.

=== Spur 231 (1962) ===
State Highway Spur 231
- Location: Wichita County
- Existed: December 1, 1961–?

The original Spur 231 was designated on December 1, 1961, in Wichita Falls from then-new US 287 at 18th Street east to then-US 287. Spur 231 was cancelled when new US 287 was completed.

== Spur 232 ==
=== Spur 232 (1950) ===
State Highway Spur 232
- Location: Upshur County
- Existed: January 27, 1950–February 19, 1953

The first use of the Spur 232 designation was in Upshur County, from FM 993 at La Fayette to a point 1 mile (1.6 km) southeast. Spur 232 was cancelled on January 27, 1953, and became an extension of FM 993.

=== Spur 232 (1969) ===
State Highway Spur 232
- Location: Lubbock County
- Existed: January 21, 1969–April 28, 1994

The next use of the Spur 232 designation was in Lubbock County, from US 62 (now US 62/SH 114) north 1 mile (1.6 km) along an extension of Indiana Avenue across Texas Tech University to FM 2255. Spur 232 was cancelled on April 28, 1994, by district request and removed from the highway system; the university had the road built and had maintained it themselves and was removed because TxDOT no longer needed it.

== Spur 233 ==
State Highway Spur 233
- Location: Oldham County
- Length: 0.634 mi (1,020 m)
- Existed: January 27, 1950–present

Spur 233 is located in Oldham County. It runs from US 385 (former SH 51) to Boys Ranch.

Spur 233 was designated on January 27, 1950, on the current route.

== Spur 234 ==
State Highway Spur 234
- Location: Grimes County
- Length: 0.488 mi (785 m)
- Existed: May 30, 1950–present

Spur 234 is located in Grimes County. It runs from SH 105 south to Stoneham.

Spur 234 was designated on May 30, 1950, on the current route.

== Spur 239 ==
State Highway Spur 239
- Location: Val Verde County
- Length: 2.163 mi (3.481 km)
- Existed: September 28, 1950–present

Spur 239 is located in Del Rio. It runs from US 90/US 277 and Spur 297 to the International Bridge.

Spur 239 was designated on September 28, 1950, from US 277 in Del Rio to the International Bridge as a replacement of a spur of US 277. On January 24, 1978, the road was rerouted along Las Vacas Road to Rio Grande Lane. On January 28, 1985, the road was extended northeast to new US 277, replacing a section of US 277. On September 25, 1997, by district request, the section from US 277 (concurrent with US 277 Spur) along Las Vacas and Garfield Lane to Rio Grande Lane was removed from the highway system and Spur 239 was rerouted along Gibbs Avenue and a new route to US 277 Spur.

== Spur 240 ==
State Highway Spur 240
- Location: Maverick County
- Length: 0.579 mi (932 m)
- Existed: September 28, 1950–present

Spur 240 is located in Eagle Pass. It runs from US 57 to Bus. US 277.

Spur 240 was designated on September 28, 1950, from US 277 in Eagle Pass to the International Bridge as a replacement of a spur of US 277. On December 21, 1983, Spur 240 was rerouted to run from US 57 to Loop 431 (now Bus. US 277) due to rerouting of US 277 and Loop 431.

== Spur 241 ==
State Highway Spur 241
- Location: Hidalgo County
- Length: 5.100 mi (8.208 km)
- Existed: February 5, 1951–present

Spur 241 is located in Hidalgo. It runs from US 281 at Fay's Corner to a point north of Bridge Street in Hidalgo.

Spur 241 was designated on February 5, 1951, from US 281 east of Hidalgo via Hildago to the International Bridge. On September 11, 1978, a section from the International Bridge to a point north of Bridge Street was cancelled. On August 14, 1979, the road was rerouted in Hidalgo and the section along Bridge Street and Rhode Avenue was cancelled.

== Spur 242 ==
State Highway Spur 242
- Location: Atascosa County
- Length: 1.271 mi (2.045 km)
- Existed: March 22, 1951–present

Spur 242 is located in Pleasanton. It runs from FM 476 to SH 97.

Spur 242 was designated on March 22, 1951, on the current route. On July 16, 1965, the road was extended west 0.7 miles (1.1 km) over FM 476 to new FM 476, although this did not change the route description.

== Spur 243 ==
State Highway Spur 243
- Location: Travis County
- Existed: January 23, 1939–August 24, 1954

Spur 243 was designated on January 23, 1939, from US 81 in Austin southwest along Lamar Boulevard to SH 29 at 45th Street. On August 24, 1954, Spur 243 was cancelled and returned to the city of Austin due to rerouting of US 183.

== Spur 244 ==
State Highway Spur 244
- Location: Dallas County
- Length: 2.914 mi (4.690 km)
- Existed: June 21, 1951–present

Spur 244 is located in Dallas. It runs from Loop 12 north of White Rock Lake to SH 78.

Spur 244 was designated on June 21, 1951, on the current route along an old routing of SH 78.

== Spur 245 ==
State Highway Spur 245
- Location: Hutchinson County
- Length: 1.081 mi (1.740 km)
- Existed: October 30, 1951–present

Spur 245 is located in Borger. It runs from Spur 140 to Spur 119.

Spur 245 was designated on October 30, 1951, on the current route.

== Spur 246 ==
State Highway Spur 246
- Location: Hutchinson County
- Length: 2.975 mi (4.788 km)
- Existed: October 30, 1951–present

Spur 246 is located in Borger. It runs from Spur 119 to SH 207.

Spur 246 was designated on October 30, 1951, from Spur 119 northeast of Borger northeast to SH 152. On July 13, 1959, the road was extended southwest 2.1 miles (3.4 km) to SH 15 (now SH 207) south of Borger, replacing a section of FM 1551.

== Spur 247 ==
State Highway Spur 247
- Location: Ward County
- Length: 2.08 mi (3.35 km)
- Existed: July 25, 1960–present

Spur 247 is located in Pyote. It begins at Spur 57, the former route of US 80 in the region. It runs northward along Pyote Street, crossing RM 2355, before leaving the town. It then curves to the northeast before ending at SH 115.

Spur 247 was designated on July 25, 1960, from then-proposed SH 115 south to I-20 (later US 80, now Spur 57) along an old routing of SH 115.

=== Spur 247 (1951) ===
State Highway Spur 247
- Location: Bexar County
- Existed: November 19, 1951–March 18, 1960

The original Spur 247 was designated on November 19, 1951, from US 81 east and south along Herff, S. Alamo, Probandt and Hick Streets to US 181 at S. Presa Street. The route became co-designated with US 87, and this was removed on March 18, 1960, cancelling Spur 247.

== Spur 248 ==
State Highway Spur 248
- Location: Smith County
- Length: 3.601 mi (5.795 km)
- Existed: February 20, 1959–present

Spur 248 (University Boulevard} is a 3.601-mile (5.795 km) state highway spur in Smith County that connects Loop 323 in Tyler with SH 64 in Bascom.

Spur 248 was designated on February 20, 1959, on the current route.

=== Spur 248 (1952) ===
State Highway Spur 248
- Location: Hill County
- Existed: February 21, 1952–October 27, 1953

The original Spur 248 was in Hill County, was designated on February 21, 1952, and connected FM 67 in Blume with SH 353 (now SH 174), north of Blum. On October 27, 1953, Spur 248 was cancelled and transferred to FM 67.

== Spur 250 ==
State Highway Spur 250
- Location: Walker County
- Existed: August 27, 1959–October 8, 1965

Spur 250 was designated on August 27, 1959, from US 75 (now SH 75) 1 mile (1.6 km) northwest of Mossy Grove northeast to I-45. On October 8, 1965, Spur 250 was cancelled and transferred to FM 2989.

== Spur 253 ==
State Highway Spur 253
- Location: Bell County
- Existed: April 29, 1952–December 13, 2007

Spur 253 was designated on April 29, 1952, from then-new US 81 west 0.55 miles (0.89 km) along Central Avenue to Main Street in Belton. On December 13, 2007, Spur 253 was cancelled and returned to the city of Belton.

== Spur 258 ==
State Highway Spur 258
- Location: Karnes County
- Existed: September 25, 1952–June 21, 1990

Spur 258 was designated on September 25, 1952, from US 181 in northwestern Kenedy southeast to SH 72 in Kenedy along an old routing of US 181. The route was signed as US 181 Business rather than Spur 258. On June 21, 1990, Spur 258 was cancelled and transferred to Bus. US 181.

== Spur 259 ==
State Highway Spur 259
- Location: Webb County
- Length: 0.200 mi (322 m)
- Existed: August 29, 2013–present

Spur 259 is located in Webb County. It runs from SH 359 to Loop 20.

Spur 259 was designated on August 29, 2013, on the current route as a replacement of a section of Loop 20.

=== Spur 259 (1952) ===
State Highway Spur 258
- Location: Karnes County
- Existed: September 25, 1952–June 21, 1990

The original Spur 259 was designated on September 25, 1952, from SH 72 (later Spur 542, now Bus. SH 72) in Kenedy south to US 181 south of Kenedy along an old routing of US 181. The route was signed as US 181 Business rather than Spur 259. On April 20, 1982, the road was extended north along 2nd and Escondido Streets due to rerouting of SH 72. Spur 259 was cancelled on June 21, 1990, and transferred to Bus. US 181.

== Spur 260 ==
State Highway Spur 260
- Location: Webb County
- Length: 1.610 mi (2.591 km)
- Existed: May 29, 2008–present

Spur 260 is located in Laredo. It runs from US 83 to SH 359 & Loop 20.

The route is also known as Jaime Zapata Memorial Highway.

Spur 260 was designated on May 29, 2008; on the current route as a replacement of a section of Loop 20.

== Spur 261 ==
State Highway Spur 261
- Location: Harris County
- Length: 4.611 mi (7.421 km)
- Existed: March 24, 1954–present

Spur 261 is located in Harris County. It runs along North Shepherd Drive from I-45 north of Houston to I-610.

Spur 261 was designated on March 24, 1954, along the current route.

== Spur 263 ==
State Highway Spur 263
- Location: Navarro County
- Length: 0.092 mi (148 m)
- Existed: September 24, 1952–present

Spur 263 is located in Navarro County. It runs from SH 31 near Dawson to Battle Creek Monument.

Spur 263 was designated on September 24, 1952, on the current route.

== Spur 264 ==
State Highway Spur 264
- Location: Hunt County
- Length: 1.420 mi (2.285 km)
- Existed: January 28, 1970–present

Spur 264 is located in Quinlan. It runs from SH 276 to SH 34.

Spur 274 was designated on January 28, 1970, as a redesignation of Loop 264 when a section was transferred to SH 276.

== Spur 268 ==
State Highway Spur 268
- Location: Midland County
- Existed: November 19, 1952–June 30, 2011

Spur 268 was designated on November 19, 1952, from US 80 (now Business I-20) near western Midland northeast to SH 158 (now Bus. SH 158) in Midland along an old routing of US 80. The route was signed as US 80 Business rather than Spur 268. On June 30, 2011, the route was changed to Loop 268.

== Spur 269 ==
State Highway Spur 269
- Location: Midland County
- Existed: November 19, 1952–June 30, 2011

Spur 269 was designated on November 19, 1952, from SH 158 (now Bus. SH 158) in Midland east to US 80 (now Business I-20) in Midland along an old routing of US 80. The route was signed as US 80 Business rather than Spur 269. On June 30, 2011, Spur 269 was cancelled and returned to the city of Midland.

== Spur 270 ==
State Highway Spur 270
- Location: Parmer County
- Existed: June 24, 1953–June 21, 1990

Spur 270 was designated on June 24, 1953, from FM 299 (now SH 214) in Friona west along 5th Street to US 60. On January 30, 1976, the road was extended north 0.4 miles (0.64 km) over former SH 214 along Main Street to US 60 and the western terminus was moved to new SH 214 when it was rerouted. Spur 270 was cancelled on June 21, 1990, and transferred to Bus. SH 214.

== Spur 272 ==
State Highway Spur 272
- Location: Newton County
- Length: 0.805 mi (1,296 m)
- Existed: January 29, 1953–present

Spur 272 is located in Newton County. It runs from SH 12 (former SH 235) to Deweyville.

Spur 272 was designated on January 29, 1953, on the current route along an old routing of SH 87.

== Spur 273 ==
State Highway Spur 273
- Location: Brazoria County
- Length: 0.332 mi (534 m)
- Existed: August 28, 1953–present

Spur 273 is located in Alvin. It connects SH 6 and Bus. SH 35.

Spur 273 was designated on August 28, 1953, along the current route.

== Spur 274 ==
=== Spur 274 (1954) ===
State Highway Spur 274
- Location: Floyd County
- Existed: February 25, 1954–October 25, 1954

The first use of the Spur 274 designation was in Floyd County, from SH 207 to US 70 in Floydada. Spur 274 was cancelled eight months later when construction was completed.

=== Spur 274 (1968) ===
State Highway Spur 274
- Location: Dallas County
- Existed: January 16, 1968–January 21, 1981

The next use of the Spur 274 designation was in Dallas County, from I-35E in Dallas west to west of Sylvan Avenue. Spur 274 was cancelled by mistake on December 7, 1971, but was restored on February 15, 1974. On January 21, 1981, Spur 274 was cancelled for real and became a portion of I-30.

== Spur 276 ==
=== Spur 276 (1954) ===
State Highway Spur 276
- Location: Dallam County
- Existed: March 24, 1954–June 21, 1990

The first use of the Spur 276 designation was in Dalhart, from US 54 at Denver and Seventh Streets east 0.488 miles (0.785 km) along Seventh Street to US 87 at Pine Street and Margaret Avenue. The route was signed as US 87 Business rather than Spur 276. Spur 276 was cancelled on June 21, 1990, and transferred to Bus. US 87.

=== Spur 276 (2008) ===
State Highway Spur 276
- Location: El Paso County
- Existed: July 31, 2008–July 26, 2012

The next use of the Spur 276 designation was in El Paso County, from SH 20 north of Borderland Road to Loop 375 north of I-10. Spur 276 was cancelled on July 26, 2012, and redesignated as Spur 16.

== Spur 277 ==
State Highway Spur 277
- Location: Williamson County
- Length: 0.647 mi (1,041 m)
- Existed: April 24, 1954–present

Spur 277 is located in Coupland. It runs from FM 1466 to SH 95.

Spur 277 was designated on April 24, 1954, on the current route along an old routing of SH 95.

== Spur 278 ==
State Highway Spur 278
- Location: Angelina County
- Length: 0.971 mi (1,563 m)
- Existed: October 27, 1953–present

Spur 278 is located in Lufkin. It runs from Bus. US 69 (S Chestnut Street) to Loop 266 (S First Street, old US 59).

Spur 278 was designated on October 27, 1953, on the current route. Although the route was to be signed as US 69 Business, it is currently signed as Spur 278.

== Spur 280 ==
State Highway Spur 280
- Location: Tarrant County
- Length: 0.567 mi (912 m)
- Existed: April 27, 1955–present

Spur 280 is a short freeway located in Downtown Fort Worth. The route connects the eastern part of Downtown with I-35W and runs as a continuation of the Martin Luther King Jr. Freeway (US 287). It was designated on April 27, 1955, on its current route.

Exit list

The entire highway is in Fort Worth, Tarrant County.

mi	km	Destinations	Notes
0.000	0.000	I-35W / US 287 north / US 377 (North Freeway) – Denton, Waco, Decatur US 287 south to I-30 east – Waxahachie, Dallas	Northbound exit and southbound entrance; roadway continues south as US 287
0.567	0.912	East 4th Street – Sundance Square; East 6th Street – Bass Performance Hall	Northern terminus; northbound exit and southbound entrance; northbound traffic merges to either 4th or 6th Streets and southbound traffic flows onto Spur 280 from 5th and 7th Streets, access to Fort Worth Central Station
1.000 mi = 1.609 km; 1.000 km = 0.621 mi

== Spur 284 ==
State Highway Spur 284
- Location: Coleman County
- Existed: ?–October 27, 1955

Spur 284 was designated from Santa Anna to 4 miles (6.4 km) east of Valera. On October 24, 1955, Spur 284 was cancelled and transferred to US 67.

== Spur 285 ==
State Highway Spur 285
- Location: Hardeman County
- Existed: April 27, 1955–December 17, 1970

Spur 285 was designated on April 17, 1955, from US 287 in western Quanah north to Spur 133 along an old routing of US 287. On December 17, 1970, Spur 285 was cancelled and became a portion of FM 2568.

== Spur 288 ==
State Highway Spur 288
- Location: Denton County

== Spur 290 ==
State Highway Spur 290
- Location: Bell County
- Length: 4.736 mi (7.622 km)
- Existed: December 19, 1955–present

Spur 290 is located in Temple. It runs from I-35 to Loop 363/SH 36/US 190 (Future I-14).

Spur 290 was designated on December 19, 1955, from then-new US 81 (now I-35) north of Temple south to US 190 (now SH 53) in Temple along an old routing of US 81. The route was signed as US 81 Business rather than Loop 290. On January 24, 1978, the road was extended south along old SH 36 from SH 53 to Loop 363 and new SH 36.

== Spur 294 ==
State Highway Spur 294
- Location: Navarro County
- Length: 1.327 mi (2.136 km)
- Existed: November 29, 1990–present

Spur 294 is located in Navarro County. It runs from US 287 to the Richland Chambers Reservoir.

Spur 294 was designated on November 29, 1990, on the current route.

== Spur 297 ==
State Highway Spur 297
- Location: Val Verde County
- Length: 0.251 mi (404 m)
- Existed: January 19, 1956–present

Spur 297 is located in Del Rio. It runs from US 90/US 277 to Spur 239.

Spur 297 was designated on January 19, 1956, from US 90 just east of the US 90/US 277 intersection in Del Rio south to US 277. On January 28, 1985, by district request, the section of Spur 297 along Bedell Avenue was returned to the city of Del Rio.

== Spur 298 ==
State Highway Spur 298
- Location: McLennan County
- Length: 1.674 mi (2.694 km)
- Existed: February 23, 1956–present

Spur 298 is located in McLennan County. It runs from US 84 near western Waco east to Spur 396 (former SH 6).

Spur 298 was designated on February 23, 1956, on the current route; the route was formerly a portion of Loop 2 before 1955.

== Spur 299 ==
State Highway Spur 299
- Location: McLennan County
- Length: 0.957 mi (1,540 m)
- Existed: February 23, 1956–present

Spur 299 is located in McLennan County. It runs from US 77/US 81 near eastern Waco east to US 84.

Spur 299 was designated on February 23, 1956, on the current route; the route was formerly a portion of Loop 2 before 1955.
