= Texas State Highway Spur 57 =

State highway in Texas

State Highway Spur 57

Route information
- Maintained by TxDOT
- Length: 11.17 mi (17.98 km)
- Existed: August 28, 1991–present

Major junctions
- West end: I-20 west of Pyote
- SH 115 in Pyote
- East end: I-20 / I-20 BL in Monahans

Location
- Country: United States
- State: Texas
- Counties: Ward

Highway system
- Highways in Texas; Interstate; US; State; Former; Toll; Loops; Spurs; FM/RM; Park; Rec
← Spur 56	→ Spur 58

Spur 57 is a state highway spur in Ward County, Texas. It is the former route of US 80 between Pyote and Monahans.

== Route description ==
The Spur 57 designation begins along the two-way westbound frontage road of I-20 west of the Pyote city limit. The route follows the roadway of former US 80 and parallels the Union Pacific Railroad to its north. Traveling eastward through Pyote, Spur 57 crosses SH 115, which provides access to I-20 at its exit 66, and passes through Wickett, where it intersects FM 1219. The Spur 57 designation ends as it enters the county seat of Monahans; the roadway transitions into Business I-20 and continues into Monahans. A connection is also provided to I-20 via its exit 76.

== History ==
A previous route designated Spur 57 was established in Montgomery County on September 25, 1939. This route provided a connection between US 75 (now SH 75) and Conroe. This route was extended through Conroe and back to US 75 on December 30, 1960, and was given the designation Loop 57. The route was truncated to SH 105 and the designation was changed back to Spur 57 on May 1, 1980. The entirety of this route was removed from the state highway system on April 15, 1986.

The current Spur 57 was designated on August 28, 1991, as part of the cancellation of US 80 west of Dallas.

== Major intersections ==
The entire route is in Ward County.

Location	mi	km	Destinations	Notes
	0.0	0.0	I-20	Western terminus; continues as westbound frontage road
Pyote	0.5	0.80	Spur 247 (Pyote Street)	
Pyote	0.8	1.3	SH 115 (Rodgers Street) / FM 1927 – Wink	
	4.9	7.9	Spur 65	
Wickett	8.3	13.4	FM 1219	
Monahans	11.1	17.9	I-20 / I-20 BL	Eastern terminus
1.000 mi = 1.609 km; 1.000 km = 0.621 mi

== See also ==
- List of state highway spurs in Texas
- U.S. Route 80 in Texas
