= National Register of Historic Places listings in Winkler County, Texas =

Location of Winkler County in Texas

This is a list of the National Register of Historic Places listings in Winkler County, Texas.

This is intended to be a complete list of properties and districts listed on the National Register of Historic Places in Winkler County, Texas. There is one property listed on the National Register in the county.

This National Park Service list is complete through NPS recent listings posted March 21, 2025.

== Current listings ==
The locations of National Register properties may be seen in a mapping service provided.

	Name on the Register	Image	Date listed	Location	City or town	Description
1	Rig Theater	Rig Theater	August 14, 2003 (#03000770)	213-215 E. Hendricks Blvd. 31°45′21″N 103°09′25″W	Wink	

== See also ==
- National Register of Historic Places listings in Texas
- Recorded Texas Historic Landmarks in Winkler County
