= KJHS =

KJHS may refer to:

- Kehillah Jewish High School
- Kennedy Junior High School
- Kermit Junior High School
- Killicomaine Junior High School
- Kaunas Jesuit High School( Kaunas Jesuit Gymnasium )
- KJHS-LP, a low-power radio station (107.9 FM) licensed to serve Wenatchee, Washington, United States
