= Cumby (surname) =

Cumby is a surname. Notable people with the surname include:

- Bert Cumby (1912–1981), American military intelligence officer
- George Cumby (born 1956), American football player
- William Pryce Cumby (1771–1837), British Royal Navy officer
