= Texas State Highway 115 =

State highway in Texas

State Highway 115
- SH 115, highlighted in red

Route information
- Maintained by TxDOT
- Length: 106.47 mi (171.35 km)
- Existed: by 1933 (current route 1990)–present

Major junctions
- Southwest end: I-20 / FM 1927 at Pyote
- US 385 at Andrews
- Northeast end: SH 349 at Patricia

Location
- Country: United States
- State: Texas

Highway system
- Highways in Texas; Interstate; US; State; Former; Toll; Loops; Spurs; FM/RM; Park; Rec
| ← SH 114 | → SH 116 |

State Highway 115 (SH 115) is a state highway in the U.S. state of Texas that runs from Interstate 20 in Pyote to SH 349 at Patricia.

== Route description ==
SH 115 begins at an intersection with Interstate 20 and Farm to Market Road 1927 in Pyote. The route travels north along the eastern edge of town and through Far West Texas oil fields before reaching Wink. The route then turns northeast, next reaching Kermit. The route travels through downtown Kermit, passing the Winkler County Courthouse. The route continues to the northeast, crossing oil fields of Winkler and Andrews Counties, before reaching Andrews. The route travels through Andrews, intersecting U.S. Route 385. The route continues northeast, crossing through the intersection of Andrews, Gaines, Martin, and Dawson Counties before reaching its terminus at SH 349 at the unincorporated community of Patricia, Texas.

== History ==

SH 115 was originally proposed on July 13, 1926 as a route from north of Amarillo to Stratford into Oklahoma. On December 2, 1931, this route became an extension of SH 9. On June 2, 1932, SH 115 was redesignated on a new route as a short route between Pyote through Wink to Kermit. On October 21, 1952, an extension of SH 115 along FM 703 was signed, but not designated. The extension was officially designated on August 29, 1990, replacing FM 703.

== Major intersections ==
| County | Location | mi | km | Destinations | Notes |
|---|---|---|---|---|---|
| Ward | Pyote | 0.00 | 0.00 | I-20 / FM 1927 south – Monahans, Pecos | I-20 exit 66; roadway continues south as FM 1927 |
| Ward | Pyote | 0.26 | 0.42 | Spur 57 – Barstow, Wickett | |
| Ward | | 2.27 | 3.65 | Spur 247 south – Pyote | Northern terminus of Spur 247 |
| Winkler | Wink | 16.1 | 25.9 | FM 1232 – Winkler County Airport | |
| Winkler | | 22.64 | 36.44 | SH 302 – Mentone, Odessa | Interchange |
| Winkler | Kermit | 24.61 | 39.61 | SH 18 north (N. Pine Street) – Jal, NM | Western end of SH 18 concurrency |
| Winkler | Kermit | 24.79 | 39.90 | SH 18 south – Monahans | Eastern end of SH 18 concurrency; access to Winkler County Memorial Hospital |
| Andrews | | 49.27 | 79.29 | SH 128 west – Jal, NM | Eastern terminus of SH 128 |
| Andrews | Andrews | 69.33 | 111.58 | Loop 1910 (truck route) | |
| Andrews | Andrews | 70.04 | 112.72 | SH 176 west – Eunice, NM | Western end of SH 176 concurrency |
| Andrews | Andrews | 71.21 | 114.60 | US 385 (Main Street) – Odessa, Seminole | |
| Andrews | Andrews | 73.01 | 117.50 | Loop 1910 (truck route) | |
| Andrews | | 73.48 | 118.25 | SH 176 east – Big Spring | Eastern end of SH 176 concurrency |
| Martin | No major junctions | | | | |
| Gaines | No major junctions | | | | |
| Dawson | | 107.27 | 172.63 | SH 349 – Midland, Lamesa | |
1.000 mi = 1.609 km; 1.000 km = 0.621 mi: Concurrency terminus
