= Patricia, Texas =

Unincorporated community in Dawson County, Texas, United States

- Unincorporated community
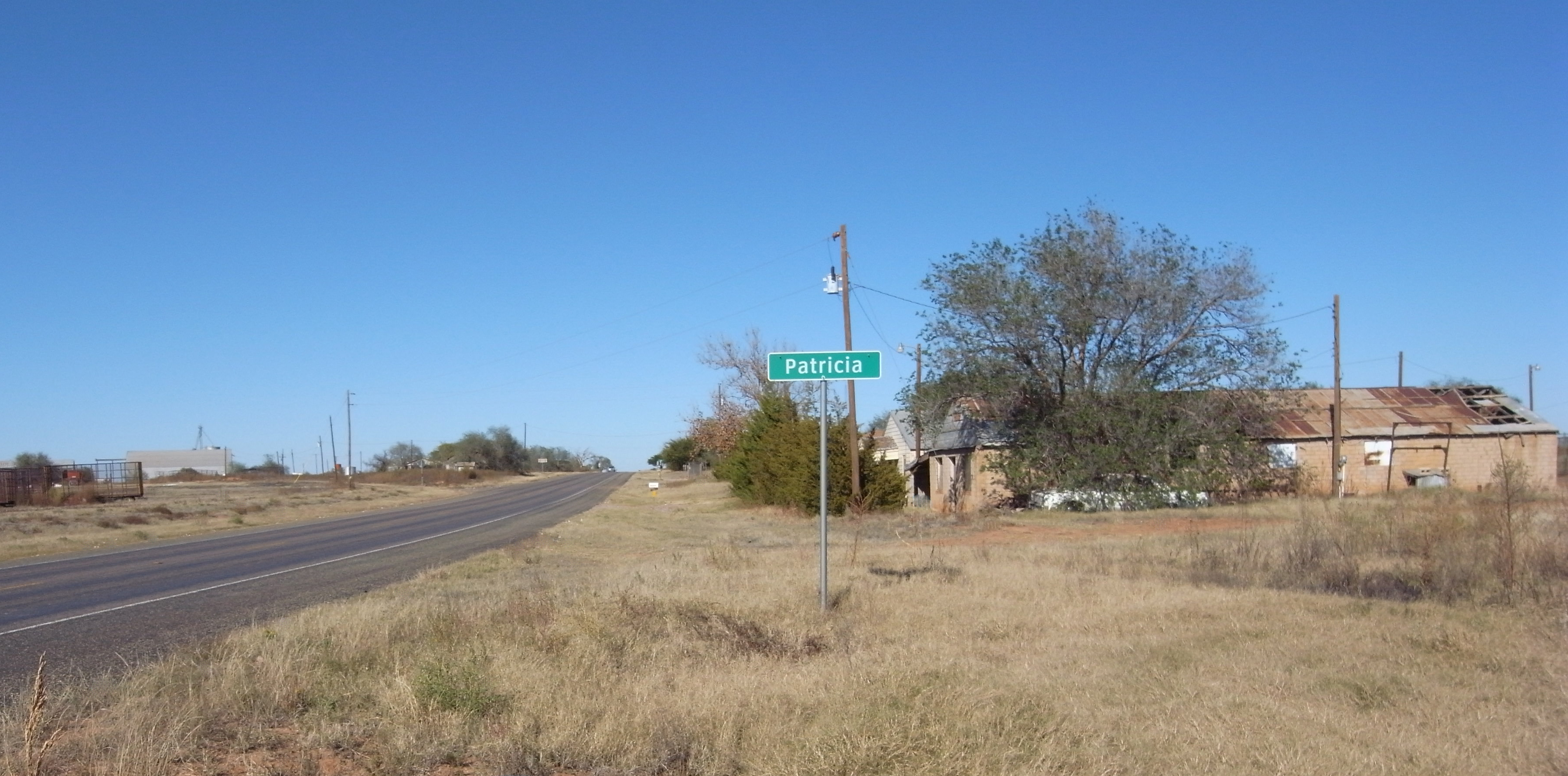
- Patricia city limits, November 2009

- Location of Patricia in Texas
- Coordinates: 32°33′16″N 102°01′14″W
- Country: United States
- State: Texas
- County: Dawson
- Region: Llano Estacado
- Established: 1923
- Founder: Birge-Forbes Land Company
- Elevation: 2,923 ft (891 m)

Population (2000)
  - Total: 60
- Time zone: UTC-6 (CST)
- ZIP code: 79331
- Area code: 806
- Website: Handbook of Texas

Patricia is an unincorporated community in Dawson County, Texas, United States. According to the Handbook of Texas, the community had an estimated population of 60 in 2000.

== History ==
Patricia was founded in 1923. It served as the headquarters of the Sherman-based Birge-Forbes Land Company, which owned eight land grants in the county. A local historian and company agent, Matthew C. Lindsey, sold some of them to farmers and built a gin in the area. When a post office was established that year, its original name, Natalie, was changed to Patricia, most likely for the granddaughter of one of the company's owners. It remained in operation until 1980. From 1948 through 2000, the community's population was 60 served by seven businesses. According to the Texas Escapes magazine, the name Natalie was changed so as not to confuse it with Natalia in Medina County. The population remained at 60 in 2010.

On April 23, 2008, trained storm spotters reported a brief EF0 tornado south of Patricia. A month later, on May 27, 2008, a brief EF0 tornado remained over open country northwest of Patricia, causing no damage. On May 26, 2014, another EF0 tornado that did not cause any damage struck Patricia.

== Geography ==
Patricia lies on the high plains of the Llano Estacado. It is located at the junction of State Highway 349 and State Highway 115 in southwestern Dawson County, approximately 13 miles (21 km) southeast of Lamesa, 16 miles (26 km) north of Tarzan, and 45 miles (72 km) northwest of Big Spring. The nearest large city is Midland, 43 miles (69 km) to the south. It is also on Farm to Market Road 828 and Farm to Market Road 703.

== Education ==
Patricia is served by the Klondike Independent School District.

== See also ==
- List of Farm to Market Roads in Texas (2000–2099)
- Texas State Highway 176
- List of Farm to Market Roads in Texas (1700–1799)
