= Clinton McKamy Winkler =

American politician

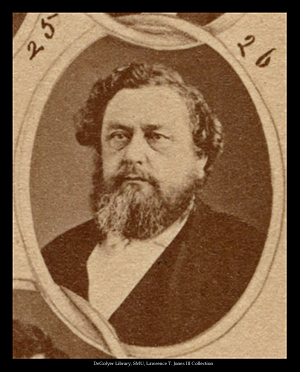

Member of House of Representatives, Republic of Texas
- In office 1847 – 1849, 1873 – 1874

Judge, Texas Court of Appeals
- In office 1876–1882

Personal details
- Born: October 19, 1821 Burke County, North Carolina
- Died: May 13, 1882 (aged 60) Austin, Texas
- Resting place: Corsicana, Texas
- Party: Democratic
- Profession: Lawyer, soldier

Clinton McKamy Winkler (October 19, 1821 – May 13, 1882) was an American soldier, judge, and legislator. Winkler was elected to the Texas Legislature in 1847 and 1873. He practiced law in Corsicana, Texas, through the 1850s. Winkler served in the Confederate States Army during the American Civil War and was seriously injured at the Battle of Gettysburg. He returned to law practice in Corsicana after the war. From 1876 until his death, Winkler served as a judge in the Texas Court of Appeals. Winkler County, Texas is named for him.

== Biography ==
Winkler was born in Burke County, North Carolina, on October 19, 1821. He moved to Indiana with his parents in 1835. When he was 19, Winkler moved to Franklin, Texas, located in Robertson County. Winkler was a clerk for the district court in Robertson County in 1844 and was admitted to the bar the following year. Winkler was elected to the House of Representatives for the Second Texas Legislature in 1847. He introduced a petition that resulted in the creation of Navarro County, Texas from a portion of Robertson County.

In 1848, Winkler married Louisa Bartlett-Smith, who was recently widowed from Texas legislator Thomas Ingles Smith. After his service in the legislature, Winkler practiced law in Corsicana in Navarro County for several years. After Abraham Lincoln was elected president, Winkler was one of a few men who organized a Texas secession movement in Navarro County.

In the Civil War, he commanded a unit known as the Navarro Rifles, a Confederate States Army unit that belonged to Hood's Texas Brigade. Winkler's wife died in 1861 while he was at war. He married writer Angelina V. Smith, the sister of Thomas Ingles Smith, in January 1864. She founded and edited a literary publication known as the Corsicana Prairie Flower. Winkler sustained a serious wound to the leg during the Battle of Gettysburg. He continued to fight in the Civil War up to Robert E. Lee's surrender at Appomattox Courthouse. Smith later wrote an autobiography that included her experiences during the war.

In 1872, Winkler was elected to the Thirteenth Texas Legislature as a representative for District 20. His legislative district included Ellis, Hill, Kaufman, and Navarro Counties. He became a judge on the newly established Court of Appeals of Texas in 1876. Winkler died of dysentery in Austin, Texas, while serving on the court.

In 1887, a new county was established in West Texas with land that had been part of Tom Green County. It was named after Winkler. The county's population was 60 in 1900, but it increased to 442 by 1910. The population peaked at over 10,000 in 1950; it had 8,626 residents in 1990.
