= Doug Smith (composer) =

American composer (1963–2016)

Doug Smith (1963 - 2016) was a composer/pianist who graduated from Kermit High School in 1981 and began classes at Texas Tech University in Lubbock, Texas in the fall of the same year. His goal was to earn a degree in telecommunications but that same year he started working with music recording for the first time and 'Just For You', Smith's first recording, was released in the spring of 1982, is a collection of songs ranging from ragtime originals to romantic ballads.

Since then Smith has published 9 albums:

- Doug Smith - 1989
- A Special Gift - 1992
- Stained Glass - 1993
- The Human Element - 1996
- Piano Player - 1997
- Hope - 1998
- Live - 2000
- Confirmation - 2001
- Cruisin the "G" - 2007

He also has a PBS documentary released in 2003 called "There It Is". Smith died in 2016, aged 52.
