= Claude Batchelor =

American soldier convicted of collaboration

Claude J. Batchelor
- Born: December 14, 1929 (age 96); Kermit, Texas, United States
- Military career
- Allegiance: United States (1948–50); China (1950–53)
- Branch: United States Army
- Service years: 1948–1953
- Rank: Corporal
- Service number: RA-18254657
- Units: 1st Cavalry Division Band; 8th Cavalry Regiment

Claude Batchelor (born December 14, 1929) is a former United States Army soldier convicted by court martial of collaborating with China during the Korean War.

Originally from Kermit, Texas, Batchelor enlisted in the Army at age 16 and was deployed to the Korean Peninsula at the outbreak of the Korean War. He was made a prisoner of war (POW) in late 1950 after his company was overrun by Chinese forces. While interned at the Pyok-Dong POW camp, he evangelized a communist worldview to fellow prisoners and penned a letter calling for the United States to withdraw from the Korean Peninsula. According to Batchelor, his actions were the result of brainwashing. Repatriated to the United States at the end of the war, he was sentenced to 20 years imprisonment, though he ultimately served less than five.

== Early life and education ==
Claude Batchelor was born in Kermit, Texas, the second of eight children. His family was poor. He dropped out of high school at age 16 and lied about his age to enlist in the United States Army.

== Military service ==
=== Enlistment ===
Batchelor began his military career in 1948 and was posted to Japan with the 1st Cavalry Division Band, where he was a trumpet player.

=== Capture during the Korean War ===
Deployed to the Korean Peninsula with the 1st Cavalry Division following the outbreak of the Korean War, Batchelor was reassigned from divisional band duties to the 8th Cavalry Regiment. He participated in combat action against the Korean People's Army (KPA) from July to October 1950. Batchelor was part of a group of 15 soldiers detached from his company who, on the evening of October 31, 1950, were tasked with making contact with a remote outpost. While en route to their objective, the main portion of Batchelor's company was overrun by the People's Volunteer Army. The detachment was soon joined by the company's remnants, bringing their total strength to 30 personnel. After several skirmishes with Chinese patrols operating in the area, the American troops were attacked by a superior Chinese force near Unsan on November 5. After a two-hour firefight, the Americans surrendered. According to Batchelor's later testimony, he and his compatriots thought the Chinese would execute them but were surprised when a Chinese officer instead greeted each American prisoner by shaking hands, before ordering the group moved to a nearby house where they were fed and given cigarettes.

=== Conduct as a POW ===
Batchelor was ultimately interned at the Pyok-Dong prisoner of war (POW) camp. While there, he volunteered to serve on a "peace committee" formed by camp officials and composed of other POWs. While serving on the committee, Batchelor urged American POWs to sign a letter requesting the United States withdraw from the Korean Peninsula and to establish diplomatic relations with the People's Republic of China. Batchelor also penned a letter to Kermit's newspaper, the Winkler County News, in which he denounced capitalism and American biological warfare; he led lectures to fellow POWs in which he described the injustices of Jim Crow laws and the trial of Julius and Ethel Rosenberg. During his later court martial, some POWs testified that Batchelor had reported on them for transgressions of camp rules to the Chinese guards, though others stated that Batchelor had used his friendliness with camp officials to secure extra provisions for American prisoners. In 2010 William Smith, who was interned with Batchelor, reported that he was frequently seen within the compound carrying a copy of The Communist Manifesto.

At the conclusion of hostilities, Batchelor was among 21 American POWs who refused repatriation to the United States during Operation Big Switch. However, along with Edward Dickenson, Batchelor later changed his mind and was transferred back to the United States. According to Bert Cumby, who later interrogated Batchelor, he decided to leave as Chinese officials had decided to demote him from leading the defectors in favor of another prisoner. Batchelor himself, however, said he had decided to leave after reading an article about communism by Whittaker Chambers which appeared in a copy of the Reader's Digest he had acquired while a POW.

Upon return to the United States, Batchelor was promptly charged with collaboration.

== Court martial and imprisonment ==
Batchelor's court martial was convened on August 30, 1954, at Fort Sam Houston in Texas. Joel Westbrook, a civilian attorney from San Antonio and officer in the Texas National Guard, represented Batchelor. During the trial, one member of the tribunal – Edward R. Schowalter Jr. – recused himself on the grounds that, prior to the trial, he had "formulated the opinion ... that the accused is a traitor". Westbrook's defense of Batchelor was based on acknowledgment of the soldier's collaboration but claim that it was involuntary and the result of brainwashing. Psychiatrist Leon Freedman testified for the defense, stating that Batchelor suffered from "induced political psychosis" and had been led to believe that he was "a potential savior of humanity".

Batchelor was convicted on September 30 of several charges of communicating with the enemy without proper authority and of promoting disloyalty and disaffection among the civilian populace of the United States. He was sentenced to dishonorable discharge and life imprisonment, the sentence later cut to 20 years by order of Gen. Isaac D. White. In 1957 the sentence was further reduced, to ten years. He was confined at Federal Correctional Institution, Texarkana, and paroled after serving less than five years.

== Later life ==
After being paroled, Batchelor settled in San Antonio, Texas, and went to work, first, for an accountant and, next, as a clerk for Remco Corporation, a manufacturer of air conditioner parts. In November 1960 Batchelor was charged with manslaughter over his role in a traffic accident that resulted in the death of another motorist. The following year he was fined $500 in the matter.

In 1974, Batchelor was living in Chapin, South Carolina, according to an obituary published in the Odessa American for his father, O.L. Batchelor. In 2002 the Associated Press (AP) attempted to contact Batchelor; a reporter left several messages on an answering machine connected to a phone number thought to be his but did not receive a response. The phone number was disconnected shortly thereafter.

== Personal life ==
In 1949, while posted to Japan, Batchelor wed Japanese citizen Kyoko Araki in a Shinto ceremony. They were divorced on December 20, 1961, and he married 20-year-old Evelyn Butcher of East Union, Indiana, in a civil ceremony in San Antonio later that afternoon.

== See also ==
- List of American and British defectors in the Korean War
- The Manchurian Candidate
