= 1st Cavalry Division Band =

Military band of the 1st Cavalry Division, US Army

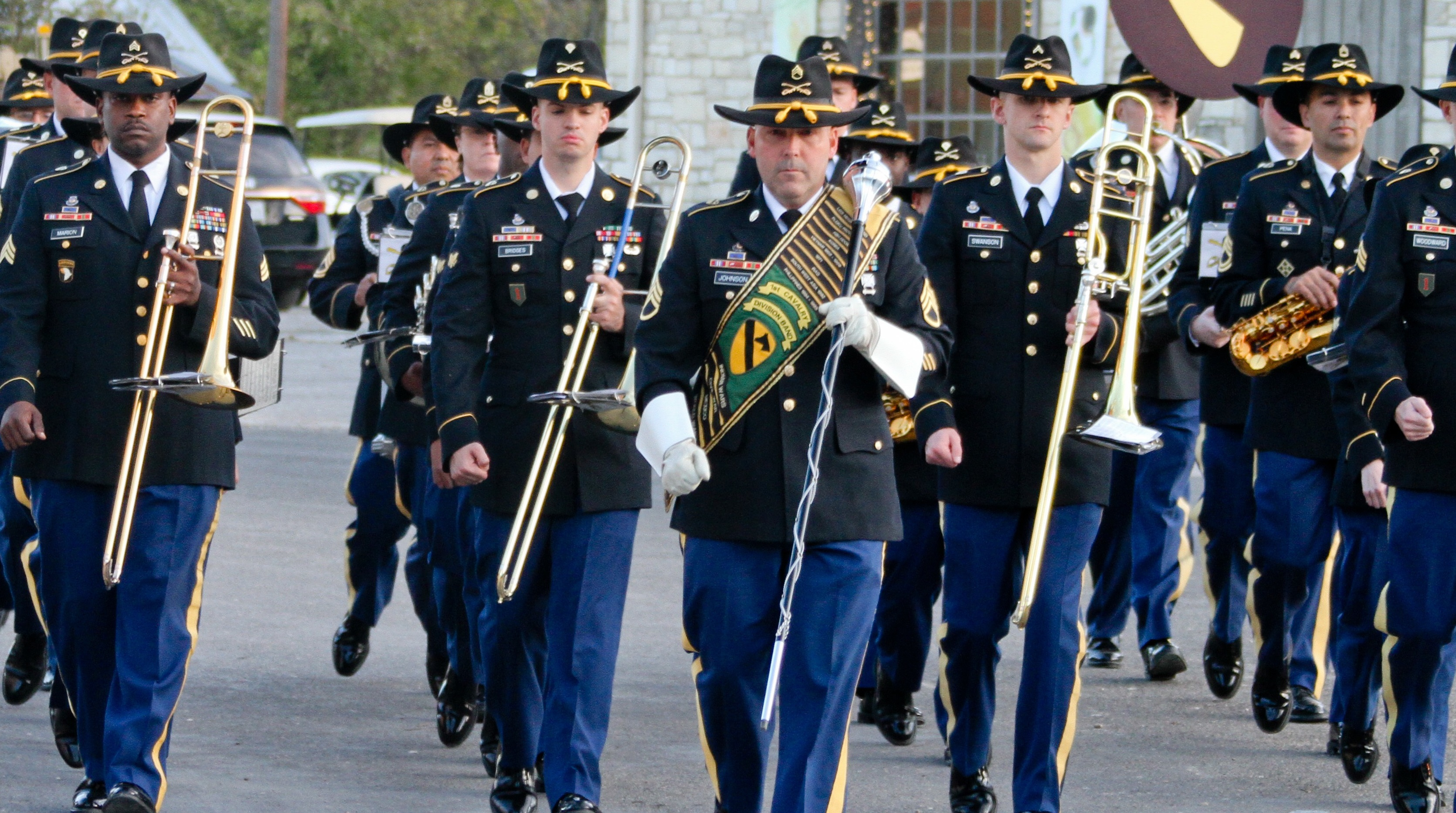
- The 1st Cavalry Division Band pictured in 2016
- Active: 1945 to Present
- Country: United States
- Branch: United States Army
- Type: Military band
- Size: 61
- Part of: 1st Cavalry Division
- Garrison/HQ: Fort Cavazos
- Nickname: First Team Band
- Motto: “Sound The Charge!”
- Decorations: Superior Unit Award

Commanders
- Commander/Bandmaster: CPT Curran Schenck
- Band Sergeant Major: Sergeant Major Byron Bartosh

The 1st Cavalry Division Band is a military band posted at Fort Hood, Texas and assigned to the headquarters of the United States Army's 1st Cavalry Division. It was activated in 1945.

The 1st Cavalry Division Band performs divisional march "The Garryowen" during a demonstration cavalry charge by the 1st Cavalry Division Horse Cavalry Detachment in 2019.

== History ==
On 3 March 1855, the 1st Cavalry Band was established in the Second Regiment of Cavalry. In March 1861, the band left their post in Fort Mason, which was transferred to the control of the Confederate Army. It would be based in the union states, specifically Pennsylvania, for a good part of the American Civil War. In December 1866, following the conclusion of the Civil War, the regimental band was disbanded at Camp Sedgwick, only to be reconstituted three years later, In 1916 the band participated in the Mexican Expeditionary Force led by General of the Armies John J. Pershing. The 1st Cavalry Division was organized in 1921, after which the associated band was reactivated and assigned to the division.

The modern 1st Cavalry Division Band was activated in Luzon, Philippines on June 3, 1945 and initially formed of personnel and equipment transferred from the recently deactivated band of the 7th Cavalry Regiment, as well as personnel from the bands of the 1st and 5th cavalry regiments. During the Korean War, the band advanced into Pyongyang and was the first American military band to perform in the North Korean capital following its fall to United States and South Korean forces in the Battle of Pyongyang. It later suffered a casualty rate exceeding 33-percent during the American withdrawal from Seoul to Taegu after the Chinese-North Korean victory in the Third Battle of Seoul.

In 1953 the band was downsized from 96 to 48 troopers and, the following year, assigned secondary duty as a smoke generator unit. Jeanne Pace was appointed bandmaster of the 1st Cavalry Division Band in 1985, becoming the first female bandmaster in the history of the United States Army.

On 3 July 1965, the band participated in the retiring of the colors of the 11th Air Assault Division, and organization of the new 1st Cavalry Division. Throughout the 1960s, the band served multiple tours in Vietnam performing concerts, participating in village support missions, and physical security. This included multiple tours, and rotations in Vietnam that resulted in the loss of seven musicians; three times, the band lost two members in single attacks in 1966, and twice in 1969.

According to the U.S. Army, on 8 April 2004, during the United States occupation of Iraq, the band survived an ambush and attack with rocket propelled grenades fired by insurgents while it was en route to perform at an officer commissioning ceremony of the Iraqi Civil Defense Corps. Bandsmen involved in the action received the Combat Action Badge.

In addition to its service during the Korean War and the 2003 invasion of Iraq, the band has also been deployed overseas during the Vietnam War and Operation Joint Forge. As of 2012, it was one of three active duty U.S. Army bands posted in Texas. When on parade, the marching band wears the division's trademark black "Cav Hat".

== Unit decorations ==
The 1st Cavalry Division Band is the recipient of eight Meritorious Unit Commendations, three Republic of Vietnam Crosses of Gallantry, the Commonwealth of the Philippines Presidential Unit Citation, and the Cross of Valour of the Greek state, among others.

== Unit structure ==
=== Leadership ===
- Band Commander: First Lieutenant Benjamin Alaniz
- Band Executive Officer:
- Band NCOIC: Sergeant Major Leon Butler
- Acting First Sergeant: Sergeant First Class Bradley Schaeffer

=== Ensembles ===
- Marching band
- Concert band
- Woodwind Quintet
- Brass Quintet
- Jazz Combo
- Rock Band

== Notable personnel ==
- Claude Batchelor – trumpet player convicted of collaboration with the enemy during the Korean War
- Corrin Campbell - bass guitar and vocalist - pop-punk musical artist, formerly the only independent artist endorsed by US Army Recruiting Command as a touring recruiting partner

== See also ==
- United States Army Band "Pershing's Own"
