= Kermit, Texas =

- City
- City of Kermit
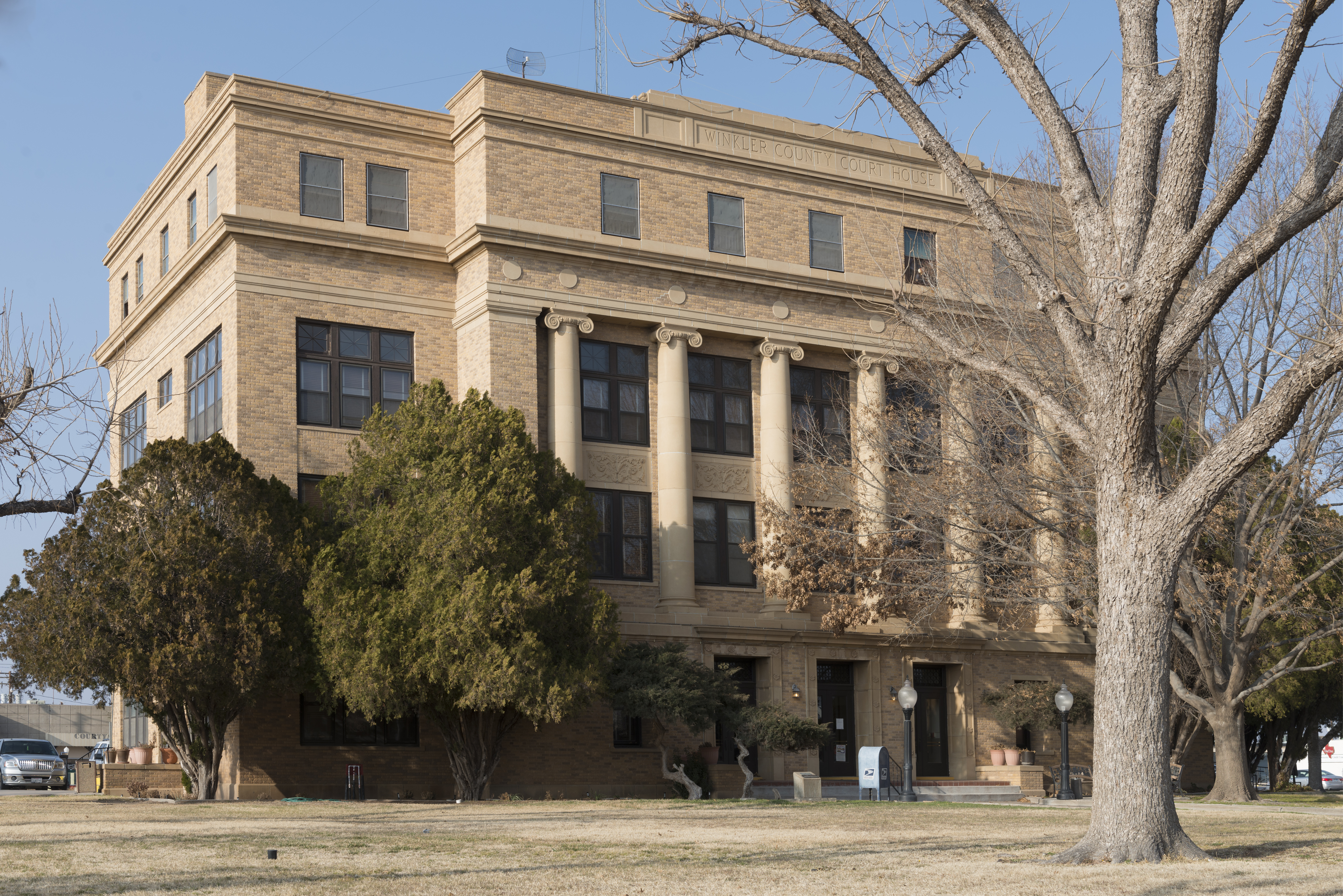
- Winkler County Courthouse in Kermit
- Nickname: K-Town
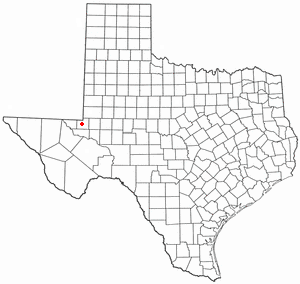
- Location of Kermit, Texas

- Coordinates: 31°51′14″N 103°5′32″W
- Country: United States
- State: Texas
- County: Winkler
- Incorporated: 1938

Government
  - Mayor: David Holbrook
  - City Manager: Frankie Davis
  - City Secretary: Diana Franco
  - Chief of Police: Jaime Ramos

Area
  - Total: 2.52 sq mi (6.52 km^{2})
  - Land: 2.52 sq mi (6.52 km^{2})
  - Water: 0 sq mi (0.00 km^{2})
- Elevation: 2,861 ft (872 m)

Population (2020)
  - Total: 6,267
  - Density: 2,577.7/sq mi (995.26/km^{2})
- Time zone: UTC−6 (Central (CST))
  - Summer (DST): UTC−5 (CDT)
- ZIP code: 79745
- Area code: 432
- FIPS code: 48-39004
- GNIS feature ID: 1360598
- Website: www.kermittx.gov

Kermit is a city in and the county seat of Winkler County, Texas, United States. Its population was 6,267 at the 2020 census. The city was named after Kermit Roosevelt.

== History ==
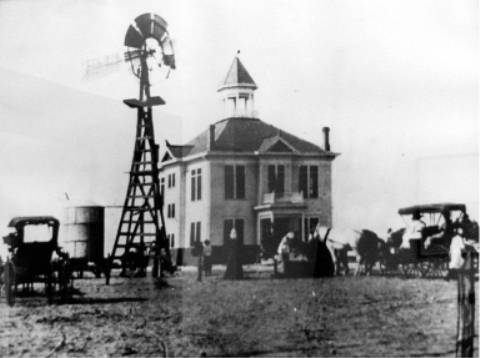
Old Winkler County Courthouse in Kermit, circa 1910

=== Establishment ===
Kermit began as a convenient supply center for the scattered ranches of the area and became the seat of Winkler County when the county was organized in 1910. The first public school and the post office opened the same year. The town's namesake, Kermit Roosevelt, once visited the T Bar Ranch in northern Winkler County to hunt pronghorn a few months before the town was named. In 1916, the county suffered a drought. Many homesteaders and ranchers were forced to leave. In 1924, only Ern Baird's family remained in the town. Only one student attended school in the county for five months of 1924. Only three houses and the courthouse were in use by 1926.

=== Discovery of oil ===
On July 16, 1926, however, oil was discovered in Hendrick oilfield, near Kermit, and the town experienced a boom. In 1927, an estimated population of 1,000 was reported; by 1929, that number increased to 1,500. On March 4, 1929, the Texas-New Mexico Railway reached the town.

=== Great Depression and incorporation ===
The Great Depression had little effect on the city throughout much of the 1930s, but the population decreased significantly in the early 1930s, and both population and business figures rose at the end of the 1930s, when 2,700 residents and 180 businesses were listed. On February 15, 1938, residents voted to incorporate. During the 1940s, the oil boom caused real estate prices to double. Housing was scarce, and some people lived in tents. A bank was opened by 1945. The grade school had to be enlarged, and a hospital was built.

=== Oil boom days ===
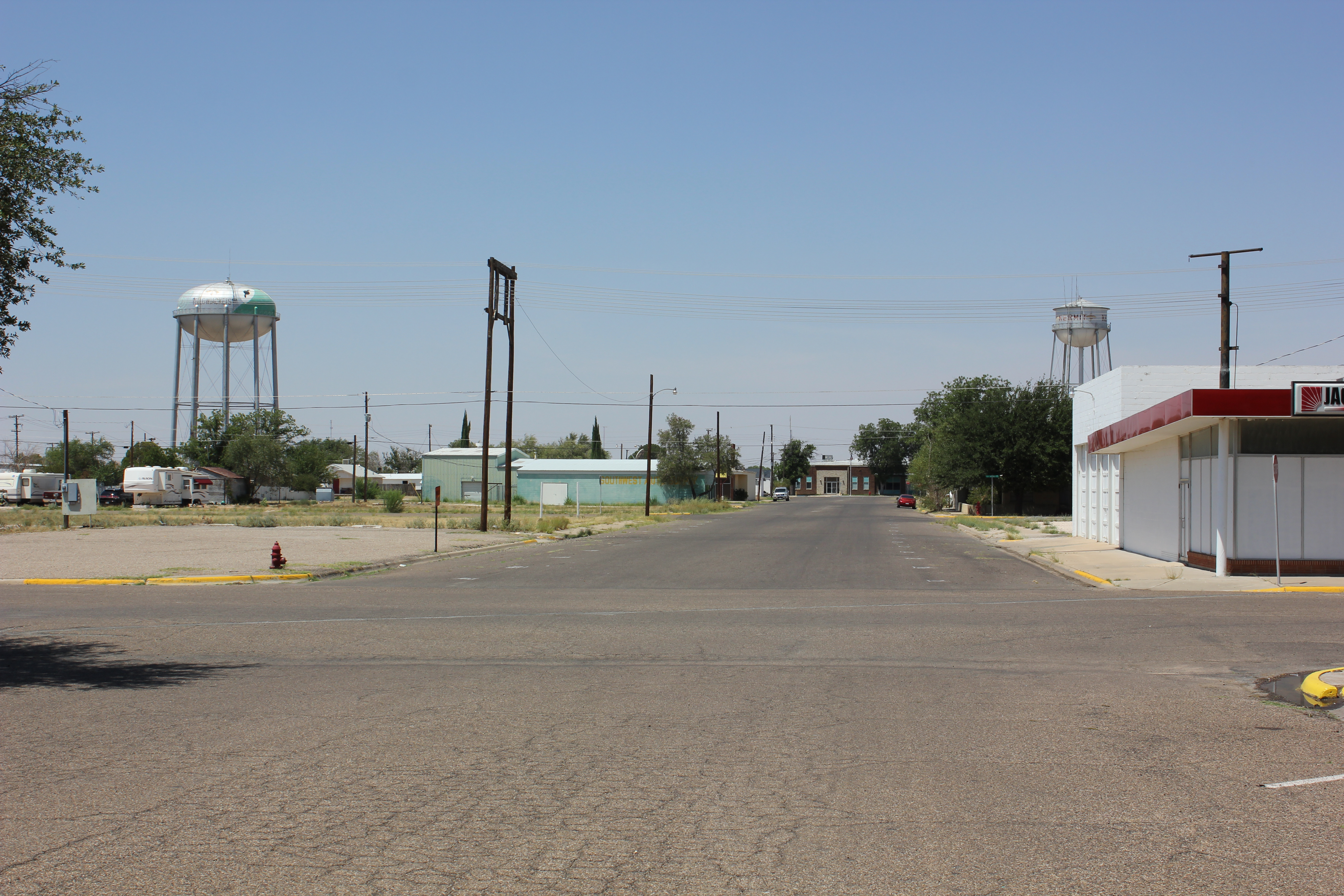
View of Kermit

In the 1950s, the town continued to grow; housing additions were built. By 1960, the city had a population of 10,465 and 260 businesses, and additional growth estimated to be over 12,000 during the decade. Flooding became a problem because of the flat terrain, so new crown streets were constructed to solve the flooding problem, and more housing additions were built. The town moved the last working wooden derrick in the Permian Basin from Loving County to Pioneer Park in Kermit in 1966 as a symbol of the importance of the oil industry to the economy of Kermit and Winkler County. In the 1970s and 1980s, the population of Kermit bounced between 8,500 and 6,912, and the number of businesses moved between 116 and 200. Improvements were made in city services, and more housing additions were built.

On June 3, 1980, a 9-ft-wide (3 m) sinkhole opened on the property of Atlantic Richfield Company and got progressively larger. Within four days, it had become a tourist attraction, with a crater measuring 400 by 200 ft (122 by 61 m), and as much as 30 ft (9.1 m) deep. The 1990 United States census set the population of Kermit at 6,875.

== Geography ==
Kermit is located at 31°51′14″N 103°5′32″W (31.853995, 103.092336). According to the United States Census Bureau, the city has a total area of 2.5 square miles (6.5 km^{2}), all land. The city is located in a semiarid region of the Permian Basin.

=== Climate ===
This area has a large amount of sunshine year round due to its stable descending air and high pressure. According to the Köppen climate classification, Kermit has a hot arid climate, BWh on climate maps, slightly too warm to be a cool arid climate (BWk) and slightly too dry for semiarid classification.

Climate data for Winkler County Airport
Month	Jan	Feb	Mar	Apr	May	Jun	Jul	Aug	Sep	Oct	Nov	Dec	Year
Record high °F (°C)	88 (31)	92 (33)	97 (36)	105 (41)	112 (44)	117 (47)	114 (46)	114 (46)	109 (43)	105 (41)	94 (34)	87 (31)	117 (47)
Mean daily maximum °F (°C)	59.6 (15.3)	64.9 (18.3)	73.1 (22.8)	82.2 (27.9)	90.0 (32.2)	96.9 (36.1)	96.9 (36.1)	95.8 (35.4)	89.4 (31.9)	80.5 (26.9)	68.5 (20.3)	61.1 (16.2)	80.1 (26.7)
Mean daily minimum °F (°C)	29.0 (−1.7)	33.1 (0.6)	40.5 (4.7)	49.5 (9.7)	59.0 (15.0)	68.0 (20.0)	70.8 (21.6)	69.5 (20.8)	62.7 (17.1)	51.0 (10.6)	37.5 (3.1)	30.0 (−1.1)	50.2 (10.1)
Record low °F (°C)	−14 (−26)	−6 (−21)	9 (−13)	20 (−7)	29 (−2)	45 (7)	52 (11)	56 (13)	33 (1)	22 (−6)	0 (−18)	2 (−17)	−14 (−26)
Average precipitation inches (mm)	0.47 (12)	0.40 (10)	0.49 (12)	0.64 (16)	1.31 (33)	1.47 (37)	1.68 (43)	1.43 (36)	1.62 (41)	1.50 (38)	0.45 (11)	0.44 (11)	11.71 (297)
Average snowfall inches (cm)	1.3 (3.3)	0.5 (1.3)	0.3 (0.76)	0.4 (1.0)	—	—	0.0 (0.0)	0.0 (0.0)	0.0 (0.0)	—	0.3 (0.76)	0.4 (1.0)	3.1 (7.9)

== Demographics ==
Historical population
Census	Pop.	Note	%±
1940	2,584		—
1950	6,912		167.5%
1960	10,465		51.4%
1970	7,884		−24.7%
1980	8,015		1.7%
1990	6,875		−14.2%
2000	5,714		−16.9%
2010	5,708		−0.1%
2020	6,267		9.8%

=== 2020 census ===
Racial composition as of the 2020 census
Race	Number	Percentage
White	2,944	47.0%
Black or African American	138	2.2%
American Indian and Alaska Native	124	2.0%
Asian	70	1.1%
Native Hawaiian and other Pacific Islander	1	0.0%
Some other race	1,646	26.3%
Two or more races	1,344	21.4%
Hispanic or Latino (of any race)	4,155	66.3%

As of the 2020 census, Kermit had a population of 6,267 people, 2,193 households, and 1,493 families. The median age was 35.1 years; 28.3% of residents were under 18 and 12.8% of residents were 65 or older. For every 100 females, there were 105.2 males, and for every 100 females 18 and over, there were 105.6 males 18 and over.

Of the 2,193 households in Kermit, 39.0% had children under 18 living in them, 50.7% were married-couple households, 20.7% were households with a male householder and no spouse or partner present, and 23.2% were households with a female householder and no spouse or partner present. About 22.3% of all households were made up of individuals, and 10.2% had someone living alone who was 65 or older.

Of the 2,609 housing units, 15.9% were vacant. The homeowner vacancy rate was 1.7% and the rental vacancy rate was 23.4%.

All of the residents lived in urban areas; none lived in rural areas.

=== 2010 census ===
At the 2010 census, 5,690 people resided in the city.

The median household income was $38,825, as opposed to $29,143 in 2000, and the median family income was $31,690. Males had a median income of $29,596 versus $18,380 for females. The per capita income for the city was $12,949. About 15.7% of families and 20.4% of the population were below the poverty line, including 27.8% of those under 18 and 16.7% of those 65 or over.

=== 2000 census ===
At the 2000 census, 5,714 people, 2,097 households, and 1,585 families resided in the city. The population density was 2,288.3 inhabitants per square mile (883.5/km^{2}). The 2,592 housing units averaged of 1,038.0 per square mile (400.3/km^{2}). The racial makeup of the city was 72.65% White, 2.05% African American, 0.47% Native American, 0.25% Asian, 22.52% from other races, and 2.07% from two or more races. Hispanics or Latinos of any race were 47.83% of the population.

Of the 2,097 households, 38.7% had children under 18 living with them, 61.3% were married couples living together, 10.0% had a female householder with no husband present, and 24.4% were not families. About 22.3% of all households were made up of individuals, and 12.0% had someone living alone who was 65 years of age or older. The average household size was 2.71 and the average family size was 3.18.

Age distribution was 29.9% under 18, 8.9% from 18 to 24, 25.3% from 25 to 44, 20.7% from 45 to 64, and 15.2% who were 65 or older. The median age was 35 years. For every 100 females, there were 95.0 males. For every 100 females 18 and over, there were 91.2 males.

== Education ==
=== Libraries ===
- Winkler County Library

=== Schools ===
The City of Kermit is served by the Kermit Independent School District, established in 1928, in a consolidation of two area school districts. The district now has three campuses: Kermit Elementary (kindergarten to grade 4), Kermit Junior High (grades 5–8), and Kermit High School (grades 9–12).

All of Winkler County is zoned to Odessa College.

=== Newspapers ===
- Odessa American (shipped from Odessa, Texas)

== Hazardous waste site ==
In July, 2017, the U.S. Environmental Protection Agency gave Kermit a federal Superfund designation, marking it as one of the most hazardous waste sites in the country. The EPA said in a statement that a portion of the Santa Rosa Aquifer in Kermit has been added to the Superfund program's National Priorities List. The aquifer in the city west of Odessa has a contaminated groundwater plume a mile long and 1.5 miles wide.

== Notable people ==
- Claude Batchelor, U.S. Army soldier convicted of collaborating with China
- William Frankfather, actor
- Jim "Razor" Sharp, two-time PRCA world-champion bull rider
- Jay Thomas, Emmy-winning actor, born in Kermit (father was a West Texas oil man) and raised in New Orleans
- Del Thompson, American football player
- John Weaver, founder of the Lincoln Project.
- John Varnell, American football player
