= Hay Flat, Texas =

- Ghost town
- Location in the state of Texas
- Coordinates: 31°54′18.2″N 103°19′11.0″W
- Country: United States
- State: Texas
- County: Winkler, Loving
- Founded: 1900
- Elevation: 2,950 ft (900 m)

Population (2010)
  - Total: 0
- Time zone: UTC-6 (Central (CST))
  - Summer (DST): UTC-5 (CDT)
- ZIP codes: ?
- Area code: ?
- GNIS feature ID: ?

Hay Flat, also spelled Hayflat, is a ghost town in Winkler and Loving counties, Texas, United States.

== History ==
The village was founded in 1900 and, in 1910, a school was built there. Due to a drought in Winkler County between 1916 and 1920, most of the residents moved away from Hay Flat, which was abandoned a few decades later.

== Geography ==
Hay Flat lies at the borders between Winkler and Loving counties, a few miles south of the borders of New Mexico. The largest portion of the village is in Winkler County.

== See also ==
- List of ghost towns in Texas
