= Wink-Loving Independent School District =

School district in Texas

Location
- Wink, Texas; United States

District information
- Type: Public
- Superintendent: Scotty Carman
- Enrollment: 403 (2013)

Other information
- Website: www.wlisd.net

Wink-Loving Independent School District is a public school district based in Wink, Texas, United States in Winkler County, Texas. The district serves students in southern and western Winkler County along with all of Loving County.

Wink-Loving ISD was established in 1928 and in the following year built a two-story Junior/High School with a mission revival styling designed by the Butler Company of Lubbock, Texas. In 1948, WLISD built a band hall and cafeteria (now administration building). In 1959, the district built an elementary school. In 1962, WLISD built a gym and pool building. Due to Loving County's school district enrollment falling to two students, it was incorporated with Wink County's school district. In 1978, WLISD extended the elementary school. In 1981, the district added a physical fitness center, then in 1982 built a new cafeteria and remodeled the old 1948 cafeteria turning it into the administration building.

In 2018, the school district was rated "failing" by the Texas Education Agency. The same agency had rated the school district "academically acceptable" in 2009.

In November 2018, Superintendent of Schools Scotty Carman and the Wink ISD school board voted 6–1 in favor of demolishing the historic but decrepit 90-year-old high school building and auditorium addition to make room for future development. Demolition was to begin in January 2019.

In 2020, the school district voted to replace the 1959 elementary school, 1948 band hall, 1948 administration building, and 1982 cafeteria. In August 2021, the new band hall was opened. The new elementary school and cafeteria opened for the 2022–2023 school year. The old elementary school was planned to be demolished after the asbestos is removed and a new administration building and auditorium were to be built on the grounds.

== Schools ==
Located in western Winkler County, the district has two campuses, both in Wink.

- Wink High School (grades 7–12) and
- Wink Elementary (prekindergarten to grade 6).

== Controversy ==
In July 2024, the ACLU of Texas sent Wink-Loving Independent School District a letter, alleging that the district's 2023-2024 dress and grooming code appeared to violate the Texas CROWN Act, a state law which prohibits racial discrimination based on hair texture or styles, and asking the district to revise its policies for the 2024-2025 school year.
