= Kermit Independent School District =

School district in Texas

Address
- 601 South Poplar Kermit, (Winkler County), Texas, 79745; United States

District information
- Type: Public
- Motto: "E Pluribus Unum" "Out of Many, One"
- Established: 1928; 98 years ago
- Superintendent: Denise Shetter

Students and staff
- Enrollment: 1,235 (2009)
- Colors: Maroon Gold

Other information
- Website: www.kermitisd.org

Kermit Independent School District is a public school district located in Kermit, Texas, United States that serves students in northeastern Winkler County and encompasses 398.09 square miles (1,031.0 square kilometers). The City of Kermit is located just under the southeast corner of New Mexico at the intersection of Texas State Highways 18, 115, and 302, and is approximately 46 miles (74 kilometers) west of Odessa. The enrollment of the district was 1,235 at the beginning of the 2010–2011 school year.

In 2009, the school district was rated "academically acceptable" by the Texas Education Agency.

The district received national attention in January 2015 after a nine-year-old boy was controversially suspended because he "told a classmate he could make him disappear with a ring forged in fictional Middle Earth’s Mount Doom." The same boy had already been suspended on two previous occasions, which were also questioned by some in the public.

== Schools ==
Kermit ISD has three campuses:

- Kermit High School (Grades 9-12)
- Kermit Junior High School (Grades 5-8)
- Kermit Elementary School (Grades Pre K-4)
