= Bert Cumby =

American military intelligence officer

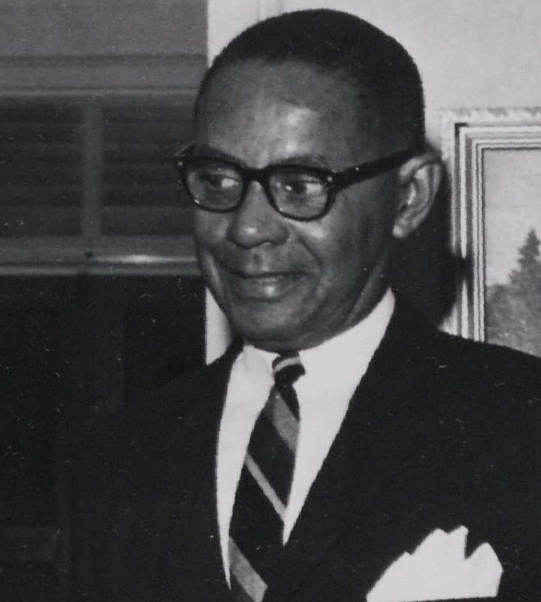
- Bert Cumby pictured in 1965 at an embassy reception in Bangkok
- Born: January 7, 1912; Corinth, Mississippi, United States
- Died: September 8, 1981 (aged 69); Washington, D.C., United States
- Spouse: Esther Cumby
- Children: Bert, Jr. Frank (adopted)
- Military career
- Allegiance: United States of America
- Branch: United States Army
- Service years: 1942–1961
- Rank: Lieutenant colonel
- Units: 92nd Infantry Division (Colored); Military Intelligence Corps
- Conflicts: World War II; Korean War
- Awards: Soldier's Medal; Bronze Star
- Other work: United States Foreign Service

Bert Cumby (January 7, 1912 – September 8, 1981) was a United States military intelligence officer who served as head of research of the U.S. Army's Military Intelligence Corps and led the debriefing of repatriated American prisoners of war (POWs) during the Korean War. In 1956 he testified to a United States Senate committee regarding an international communist conspiracy he alleged was underway, the objective of which was the admission of the People's Republic of China to the United Nations and the establishment of diplomatic relations between the United States and China. According to Cumby, this was to be partially accomplished through the brainwashing of American POWs prior to their repatriation to the United States; they would, in turn, create a nucleus of domestic support for China-friendly policies within the U.S.

== Early life and education ==
Bert Cumby was born in Corinth, Mississippi. As an adolescent he became acquainted with Robert Church Jr., the president of Solvent Savings Bank and Trust and a member of the national board of the NAACP, who was mentoring his friend Lonnie Brisco.

Cumby graduated from Fisk University and went to work as a funeral director. In the 1930s he spoke and wrote about politics; following a speech he gave to raise funds for the NAACP, the Pittsburgh Courier described him as an oratorical "wonder". In 1942 he left civilian employment and voluntarily enlisted in the United States Army. In a 1942 Detroit Free Press article, Cumby was quoted as saying his impetus for enlisting was because he "wanted to fight for a country that has done more for me than any country in the world". He was deployed to Europe and fought with the 92nd Infantry Division (Colored), seeing action in Italy as an infantry platoon leader.

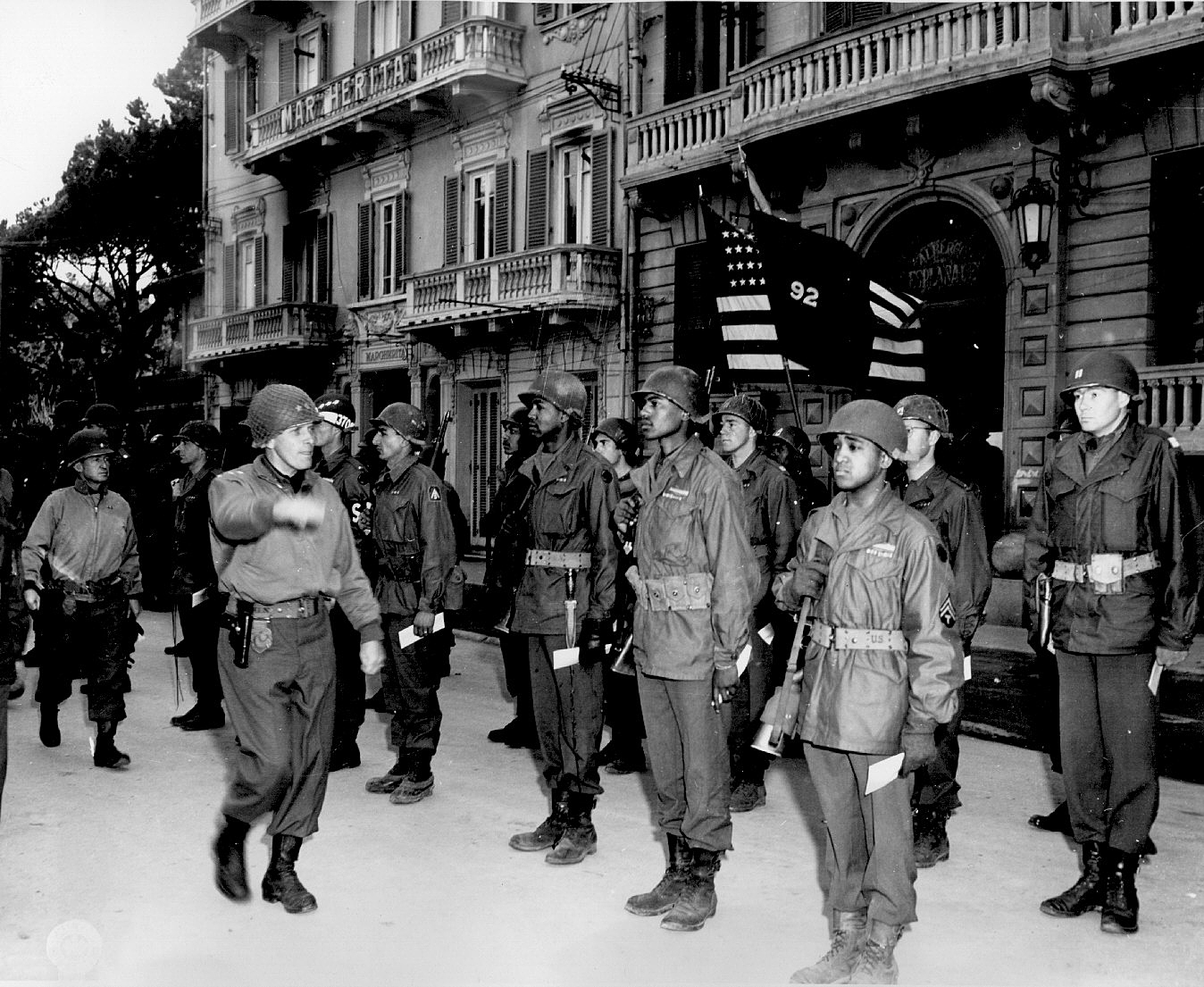
Cumby was an officer in the 92nd Infantry Division (Colored) during World War II. Pictured is Major General Edward Almond inspecting soldiers of the 92nd Division.

== Career ==
=== Military Intelligence Corps ===
After the war, Cumby was assigned intelligence duties and played an important role during the Korean War in the debriefing of returning American prisoners of war (POWs) following Operation Big Switch. He was later called before the United States Senate to answer questions of alleged communist indoctrination of American POWs, during which he testified to the Permanent Subcommittee on Investigations that roughly one-third of all American POWs had collaborated "to some degree" with their North Korean and Chinese captors, often due to thought reform overseen by officers of the Soviet Army as part of an international communist conspiracy. According to Cumby, POWs were required to attend a series of twelve classes on Marxism–Leninism, while coursework beyond the twelfth lecture was voluntary. Those prisoners who elected to continue instruction were identified as a "core" element for the alleged indoctrination regime. Cumby also testified that, based on his analysis of the curricula of the advanced courses, he had concluded that the ultimate strategic vision of the People's Republic of China was to assume China's seat in the United Nations and to establish diplomatic relations with the United States. (Note: At the time, the People's Republic of China (PRC) was not recognized by the United States and the Chinese UN seat was held by the Republic of China (ROC), instead. In 1971 the PRC took the ROC's seat in the United Nations and, in 1978, the United States severed diplomatic relations with the ROC, thereafter exchanging ambassadors with the PRC.) Cumby alleged that the pre-repatriation indoctrination of American POWs was intended to create a nucleus of post-war civilians who would advocate in the United States for these objectives.

Cumby was among the interrogators of Claude Batchelor. He also provided testimony for the prosecution in the trial of a former POW for collaboration; to protect his identity he appeared in court with his face concealed and was referred to only as "Mr. X".

Later in his career he was an instructor at the United States Army Intelligence Center and served as head of research for the Military Intelligence Corps.

=== U.S. Foreign Service ===
Cumby retired from the U.S. Army in 1961 at the rank of lieutenant colonel and entered the United States Foreign Service, holding overseas postings in Thailand and Spain.

== Personal life ==
=== Family ===
Cumby was married. With his wife, Esther, he had one biological son and also adopted an adolescent boy from Luxembourg, the adoption facilitated by the socialite and United States Ambassador to Luxembourg Perle Mesta.

Esther Cumby was a high school classmate of Agatha Davis, the wife of General Benjamin O. Davis Jr.; in his autobiography, Benjamin Davis described Bert Cumby as "a good friend". Esther Cumby, a third generation New Englander, was a schoolteacher by profession. Early in her career she volunteered to teach in a segregated school. According to Cumby, upon accepting the assignment, she "knew practically nothing of the separate schools for Negroes" and had volunteered "not because of any great race consciousness ... but because the pay scale was more attractive".

=== Retirement and death ===
Following his final retirement, Cumby remained active with the Association of Former Intelligence Officers. A resident of Silver Spring, Maryland, in 1976 he campaigned for the reelection of United States Senator John Glenn Beall Jr.

He died of cancer at Walter Reed Army Medical Center at age 69.

== See also ==
- Project MKUltra
- Robert Jay Lifton
- The Manchurian Candidate
