= Winkler County Airport =

Airport in Texas, United States

Winkler County Airport (former Wink Air Force Aux. Field)
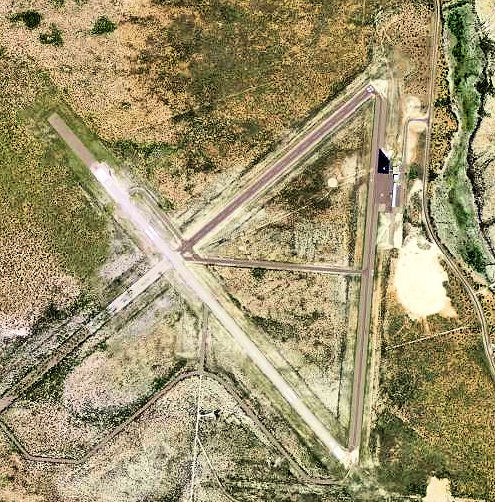
- USGS 2006 orthophoto
- IATA: INK; ICAO: KINK; FAA LID: INK

Summary
- Airport type: Public
- Owner: Winkler County
- Serves: Wink, Texas
- Elevation AMSL: 2,822 ft (860 m)
- Coordinates: 31°46′47″N 103°12′06″W
- Website: www.co.winkler.tx.us/...

Map
- Location of airport in Texas

Runways
Direction	Length		Surface
Direction	ft	m	Surface
4/22	3,514	1,071	Asphalt
13/31	5,003	1,525	Asphalt

Statistics (2021)
- Aircraft operations: 2,720
- Based aircraft: 14
- Source: Federal Aviation Administration

Winkler County Airport (IATA: INK, ICAO: KINK, FAA LID: INK) is a county-owned, public-use airport in Winkler County, Texas, United States. It is located three nautical miles (6 km) northwest of the central business district of Wink, Texas. This airport is included in the National Plan of Integrated Airport Systems for 2011–2015, which categorized it as a general aviation facility.

== History ==
The airport was opened in August 1941 as Wink Field and was used by the United States Army Air Forces as a training base. It was an auxiliary airfield to Hobbs Army Airfield, New Mexico as part of the AAF Advanced Flying School (Twin-Engine) at Hobbs. At the end of the war the airfield was determined to be excess by the military and turned over to the local government for civil use.

== Facilities and aircraft ==
Winkler County Airport covers an area of 1,000 acres (405 ha) at an elevation of 2,822 feet (860 m) above mean sea level. It has two asphalt paved runways: 13/31 is 5,003 by 100 feet (1,525 x 30 m) and 4/22 is 3,514 by 100 feet (1,071 x 30 m).

For the 12-month period ending May 20, 2021, the airport had 2,720 aircraft operations, an average of 52 per week: 100% general aviation. At that time there were 14 aircraft based at this airport, 13 single-engine and 1 helicopter.

== See also ==
- List of airports in Texas
- Texas World War II Army Airfields
