= Argenta, Texas =

Unincorporated community in Texas, US

Argenta
- Unincorporated community
- Location in Texas
- Coordinates: 28.1700080°N 97.8472215°W
- Country: United States
- State: Texas
- County: Live Oak
- Elevation: 217 ft (66 m)

Argenta is an unincorporated community in Live Oak County, Texas, United States. Situated on Farm to Market Road 88, it was settled in 1903 by Oklahoma migrant Richard Bethel Bomar, who sold the land to other Oklahoma migrants. A post office called Ego operated there from 1907 to 1926. During its peak in the 1910s, it had a population of 50 and a schoolhouse, which was consolidated by Mathis Independent School District in 1945. It declined from the 1920s, until the 1980s, when new developments began.
