= Winkler County, Texas =

County in Texas, United States

- County
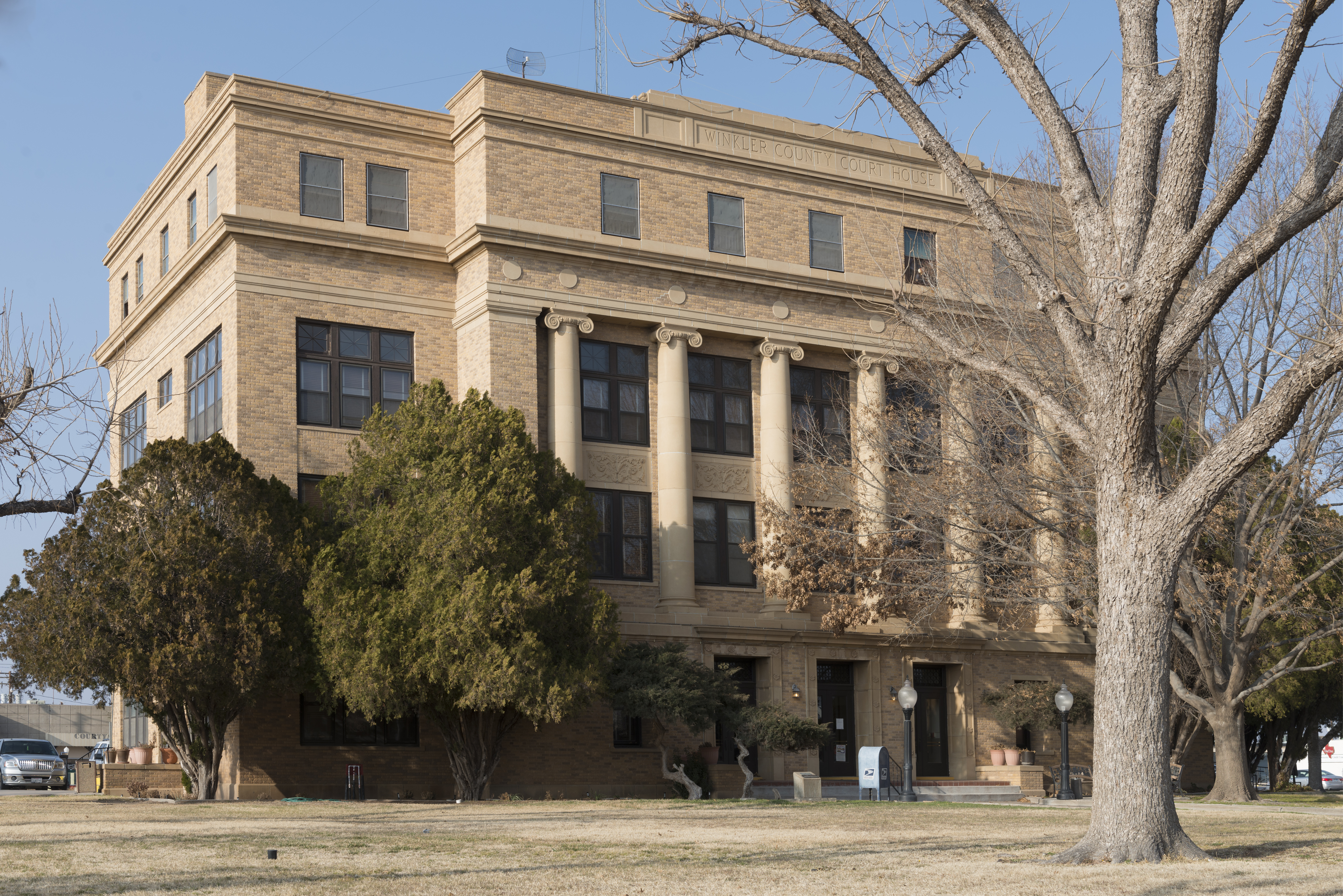
- The Winkler County Courthouse in Kermit

- Location within the U.S. state of Texas
- Coordinates: 31°52′N 103°03′W
- Country: United States
- State: Texas
- Founded: 1910
- Named for: Clinton McKamy Winkler
- Seat: Kermit
- Largest city: Kermit

Area
  - Total: 841 sq mi (2,180 km^{2})
  - Land: 841 sq mi (2,180 km^{2})
  - Water: 0.2 sq mi (0.52 km^{2}) 0.02%

Population (2020)
  - Total: 7,791
  - Estimate (2025): 7,540 ▼
  - Density: 9.3/sq mi (3.6/km^{2})
- Time zone: UTC−6 (Central)
  - Summer (DST): UTC−5 (CDT)
- Congressional district: 23rd
- Website: www.co.winkler.tx.us

Winkler County is a county in the U.S. state of Texas. As of the 2020 census, its population was 7,791. Its county seat is Kermit. The county was created in 1887 and organized in 1910. It is named for Clinton McKamy Winkler, a colonel in the Confederate Army.

== History ==
The first people known to live in the area of Winkler County were the Anasazi Indians, who migrated there about 900 AD and left their discarded pottery as evidence of their presence. These Native Americans were attracted to the area by its water, which was readily available from the interdunal ponds or from digging through to the shallow water table. The first military expeditions entered the area of present-day Winkler County in the last half of the 19th century. Captain Randolph B. Marcy brought his soldiers into the area on September 25, 1849, as he searched for the best wagon route to California. Bvt. Capt. John Pope surveyed the 32nd parallel, which separates Winkler County from New Mexico, for possible railroad construction in 1854.

On June 29, 1875, Col. William R. Shafter, accompanied by 81 men and officers, tracked the Comanche Indians into county lands, when Col. Ranald S. Mackenzie conducted a campaign to drive them from the area. By 1876, all threat of Comanche attack was eliminated and the area of Winkler County was opened for White settlement. In 1881, the Texas and Pacific Railway was built across nearby Ward County, giving easy access to the area. With good transportation, the land outside the dune fields covered in tall grasses, and a good water supply, the area was well equipped for open-range ranching. A few ranchers took advantage of free state land to carve out large ranches. Among those first ranchers were John Avary, J. J. Draper, and the Cowden brothers—Doc, Tom, and Walter.

On February 26, 1887, Winkler County was established from territory in Tom Green County. It was named for Confederate Colonel Clinton M. Winkler.

By 1890, 11 men and seven women, all White, lived in Winkler County. The State of Texas ended free use of its land in 1900, and state agents were sent across West Texas to collect rents from ranchers on public land. In the census of 1900, 12 ranches, totaling 67,537 acres (273.31 km^{2}) and 11,982 cattle, were operated by four owners and eight nonowners, and the county population was 60. From 1901 through 1905, a state law allowed the sale of school lands in West Texas. Since one could purchase four sections of land on generous credit terms, Winkler and other West Texas counties experienced a school-land rush as new settlers arrived. In 1905, the law was changed to benefit the highest bidder, but newcomers continued to come to Winkler County.

To serve the new residents, a post office was opened at Duval on April 3, 1908. It was on the John Howe ranch, 1½ miles west of the site of present Kermit. Lots in the townsite of Duval were widely promoted, and the town competed with Kermit for the county seat. When the promoters of Kermit townsite offered lots for free, county residents chose Kermit as the county seat. After losing the race with Kermit, Duval faded, and the post office closed in 1910. A post office was established at Joiel from 1908 through 1910 and at Theodore from 1909 until 1912. In 1910, Kermit and Hay Flat gained post offices. A school built at Hay Flat in 1910 operated until it was consolidated with the Kermit school in 1913; that year, the Hay Flat post office closed. On April 5, 1910, Winkler County was organized.

In the presidential election of 1908, Winkler County supported William Jennings Bryan, the Democratic candidate. The population census of 1910 reflected the effects of the school-land rush after 1901. The county population increased to 442, of whom two were European-born and one was Black. The number of farms climbed to 128 and were operated mainly by owners. Although the number of farms had increased by 1910, only small hay and corn crops were harvested on 230 acres (0.93 km^{2}) of farmland. With over 10,000 cattle and nearly 4,000 sheep, farmers were herders rather than tillers. A drought swept across Winkler County in 1916, and many families who came during the school-land rush gave up their farms and moved. By 1920, only 81 people lived in the county, and only 27 farms remained.

The number of range cattle increased to nearly 13,000, but all other livestock decreased. Only 76 acres of hay and grains were harvested, providing small yields. Because the drought lasted into 1926, the population continued to decline. The public school and post office in Kermit were in the courthouse from 1924 through 1926 to serve the few residents who remained.

In 1926, the Hendrick oil field was discovered by Roy Westbrook, J.P. Johnston, and George B. McCamey. The discovery well was located on the Hendrick Ranch in central Winkler County. The Southern Crude Purchasing Company purchased the discovery, deepened it from 3006 to 3052 ft, and increased production from 120 to 390 barrels a day. By 1928, 164 wells were producing a total of 521,597 barrels a day.

The boom established the town of Wink in the southwestern part of the county, 7 mi (11 km) southwest of Kermit. The increased population caused a housing shortage and forced newcomers to live in tents and makeshift structures, mainly in Wink. The boom also produced several small and ephemeral towns. A post office opened at Tulsa in southern Winkler County on August 20, 1927, but it closed in 1929 when the town failed to boom as its namesake had. Brookfield, another town, was a mile and a half southwest of Wink. That town had a hotel, a few stores, and several dance halls. As Wink grew, Brookfield declined. Cheyenne was laid out 9 mi (14 km) north of Kermit. A post office operated there from 1929 to 1944, but the town dwindled long before the post office closed. Leck was founded 5 mi (8.0 km) west of Cheyenne. For a short time, it had several businesses and residences, but it soon disappeared. By 1930, the oil boom brought an increase in population to 6,784. With the impact of oil and of the earlier drought, cultivation of crops continued to decline. Twenty-five farms were operated by 14 owners and 11 tenants, but no crops were sown in 1930. The number and value of all livestock decreased, but the number of cattle continued strong at 11,000 head. By 1940, the population had declined to 6,141.

The population sharply increased to 10,064 by 1950. During the 1950s, livestock production dominated agriculture. In 1954, 36 farms of 620,000 acres (2,500 km^{2}) operated, but less than 500 acres (2.0 km^{2}) were devoted to cropland. Although the county harvested $60,000 in crops in 1959, it was the last year in which crops were reported. The value of livestock reached $1.25 million by 1969, but dropped to $1 million by 1982. The population in 1960 reached an all-time high of 13,652, including 439 non-White residents. By 1970, the oil industry had experienced a decline in West Texas, and the population in Winkler County dropped to 9,640. From 1912 through 1948, the county remained predominantly in the Democratic party, although Republican Dwight D. Eisenhower took the county in the 1950s. Democratic presidential candidates won in 1960 and 1964, but from 1968 through 1992, the county voted Republican. By 1980, West Texas had experienced a dramatic oil boom with greatly increased drilling activity and an influx of new people in blue-collar jobs. The population of Winkler County reflected the boom with 9,944 residents. That number included 2.42% African Americans and 25.8% Mexican Americans. High-school graduates continued to increase, and their number reached 52.9% of the population. During the early 1980s, the oil industry began another decline, brought on by falling prices for crude oil. By 1990, the population of the county dipped again to 8,626, of whom 3,172 were Hispanic. Most of the population lived in Kermit (6,875) or Wink (1,189). Winkler County in the early 1990s continued as an oil and ranching county.

=== Nursing controversy ===
In 2009, at Winkler County Memorial Hospital, two nurses, Anne Mitchell and Vicki Galle, were retaliated against for reporting physician Rolando Arafiles' inappropriate medical treatments to the Texas Medical Board. The story received national attention. The retaliation against the two nurses involved an investigation by the county sheriff Robert Roberts, a friend and former business partner of Arafiles', into the nurses allegedly harassing the physician by filing the complaint. Arafiles approached Roberts after receiving notification from the board that a complaint had been filed by persons whose identities the board decided to shield. Roberts, armed with search warrants, set to work finding out who had contacted the medical board. After obtaining confidential medical records based on protected private health-care information provided by Arafiles, Roberts brought the case to the prosecutor. County attorney Scott Tidwell sought to prosecute the two nurses for misuse of official information, a felony that carries a possible $10,000 fine and a 10-year jail sentence. A grand jury, before which Roberts was the sole witness, indicted the two nurses. They were immediately fired from their jobs at the hospital. The pair had been members of the administration responsible for credentialing physicians, quality assurance, and risk management.

The charges against Galle were dismissed at the last hour before trial. On February 11, 2010, Mitchell was acquitted by a jury that deliberated for less than an hour. The Texas Attorney General's office became involved after the criminal prosecution against the two nurses ended, investigating the actions of the prosecution and law enforcement. Ultimately, indictments against four of the people involved in the retaliation against the nurses were issued, which included the same felony charge of misuse of official information, which Roberts and Tidwell has pursued against the nurses. Arafiles was indicted on felony retaliation and misuse of official information charges. Roberts and Tidwell were indicted on misuse of official information and official oppression charges. Hospital administrator Stan Wiley was indicted on felony retaliation charges and accepted a plea deal in March 2011, where he pleaded guilty to a misdemeanor in exchange for cooperating with the state. He was sentenced to 30 days in jail and fined $2,000.

Sheriff Roberts was convicted at trial and was sentenced to 100 days in jail on each of four felony counts, fined $6000 on four felony and two misdemeanor counts, and sentenced to four years felony probation on two counts each of misuse of official information and retaliation. In September 2011, former county attorney Scott Tidwell was found guilty of misuse of official information, retaliation, and official oppression, sentenced to 120 days in jail and fined $6000. Arafiles also cut a deal with prosecutors and pled guilty in exchange for 60 days in jail, the surrender of his medical license, a $5,000 fine, and 5 years probation.

Mitchell and Galle sued Winkler Memorial Hospital, the county, the sheriff, Wiley, Arafiles, Tidwell, and District Attorney Michael Fostel in United States District Court on August 29, 2009, for deprivation of rights, vindictive prosecution, conspiracy to interfere with employment relationship, violation of the Texas Whistleblower Act, and assorted other claims. The county settled the suit on behalf of all the defendants for $750,000.

== Geography ==
According to the U.S. Census Bureau, the county has an area of 841 square miles (2,180 km^{2}), of which 841 square miles (2,180 km^{2}) are land and 0.2 square miles (0.52 km^{2}) (0.02%) is covered by water. The climate is generally dry, and in spring and summer, it is hot; the hottest daily maximum temperatures in the continental US are often recorded in lower elevation areas near the Pecos River in the county, particularly during April, May, and June.

=== Adjacent counties ===
- Andrews County (northeast)
- Ector County (east)
- Ward County (south)
- Loving County (west)
- Lea County, New Mexico (northwest/Mountain Time Zone)

== Demographics ==
Historical population
Census	Pop.	Note	%±
1890	18		—
1900	60		233.3%
1910	442		636.7%
1920	81		−81.7%
1930	6,784		8,275.3%
1940	6,141		−9.5%
1950	10,064		63.9%
1960	13,652		35.7%
1970	9,640		−29.4%
1980	9,944		3.2%
1990	8,626		−13.3%
2000	7,173		−16.8%
2010	7,110		−0.9%
2020	7,791		9.6%
2025 (est.)	7,540	▼	−3.2%
U.S. Decennial Census; 1850–2010 2010 2020

=== Racial and ethnic composition ===
Winkler County, Texas – Racial and ethnic composition Note: the US Census treats Hispanic/Latino as an ethnic category. This table excludes Latinos from the racial categories and assigns them to a separate category. Hispanics/Latinos may be of any race.
Race / Ethnicity (NH = Non-Hispanic)	Pop 1980	Pop 1990	Pop 2000	Pop 2010	Pop 2020	% 1980	% 1990	% 2000	% 2010	% 2020
White alone (NH)	7,081	5,236	3,825	3,024	2,702	71.21%	60.70%	53.32%	42.53%	34.68%
Black or African American alone (NH)	239	155	127	129	139	2.40%	1.80%	1.77%	1.81%	1.78%
Native American or Alaska Native alone (NH)	21	40	21	29	38	0.21%	0.46%	0.29%	0.41%	0.49%
Asian alone (NH)	6	8	10	16	77	0.06%	0.09%	0.14%	0.23%	0.99%
Native Hawaiian or Pacific Islander alone (NH)	x	x	0	0	0	x	x	0.00%	0.00%	0.00%
Other race alone (NH)	30	15	0	43	9	0.30%	0.17%	0.00%	0.60%	0.12%
Mixed race or Multiracial (NH)	x	x	34	45	94	x	x	0.47%	0.63%	1.21%
Hispanic or Latino (any race)	2,567	3,172	3,156	3,824	4,732	25.81%	36.77%	44.00%	53.78%	60.74%
Total	9,944	8,626	7,173	7,110	7,791	100.00%	100.00%	100.00%	100.00%	100.00%

=== 2020 census ===
As of the 2020 census, the county had a population of 7,791. The median age was 35.0 years. 28.1% of residents were under the age of 18 and 12.5% of residents were 65 years of age or older. For every 100 females there were 107.1 males, and for every 100 females age 18 and over there were 107.6 males age 18 and over.

The racial makeup of the county was 51.9% White, 2.1% Black or African American, 1.7% American Indian and Alaska Native, 1.1% Asian, <0.1% Native Hawaiian and Pacific Islander, 23.1% from some other race, and 20.0% from two or more races. Hispanic or Latino residents of any race comprised 60.7% of the population.

81.9% of residents lived in urban areas, while 18.1% lived in rural areas.

There were 2,687 households in the county, of which 39.3% had children under the age of 18 living in them. Of all households, 50.9% were married-couple households, 20.2% were households with a male householder and no spouse or partner present, and 23.5% were households with a female householder and no spouse or partner present. About 21.8% of all households were made up of individuals and 9.8% had someone living alone who was 65 years of age or older.

There were 3,218 housing units, of which 16.5% were vacant. Among occupied housing units, 76.5% were owner-occupied and 23.5% were renter-occupied. The homeowner vacancy rate was 1.8% and the rental vacancy rate was 23.1%.

=== 2000 census ===
As of the 2000 census, 7,173 people, 2,584 households, and 1,969 families were residing in the county. The population density was 8 people per square mile (3.1 people/km^{2}). The 3,214 housing units averaged 4 units per square mile (1.5 units/km^{2}). The racial makeup of the county was 74.81% White, 1.85% African American, 0.45% Native American, 0.20% Asian, 20.35% from other races, and 2.34% from two or more races. Hispanics or Latinos of any race were 44.00% of the population.

Of the 2,584 households, 39.20% had children under the age of 18 living with them, 61.80% were married couples living together, 10.10% had a female householder with no husband present, and 23.80% were not families. About 21.70% of all households were made up of individuals, and 11.30% had someone living alone who was 65 years of age or older. The average household size was 2.72, and the average family size was 3.18.

In the county, the age distribution was 29.80% under 18, 8.70% from 18 to 24, 26.10% from 25 to 44, 21.00% from 45 to 64, and 14.30% who were 65 years of age or older. The median age was 35 years. For every 100 females, there were 96.40 males. For every 100 females age 18 and over, there were 93.70 males.

The median income for a household in the county was $30,591, and for a family was $34,021. Males had a median income of $31,140 versus $18,967 for females. The per capita income for the county was $13,725. About 14.40% of families and 18.70% of the population were below the poverty line, including 25.00% of those under age 18 and 16.80% of those age 65 or over.

== Politics ==
Winkler County was represented in the Texas House of Representatives from 1993 to 2008 by George E. "Buddy" West of Odessa. West died on June 25, 2008, and he was succeeded in January 2009 by fellow Republican Tryon D. Lewis, who unseated West in the April 8 primary election.

United States presidential election results for Winkler County, Texas
Year	Republican		Democratic		Third party(ies)	
Year	No.	%	No.	%	No.	%
1912	0	0.00%	26	100.00%	0	0.00%
1916	0	0.00%	21	100.00%	0	0.00%
1920	2	10.53%	17	89.47%	0	0.00%
1924	1	6.25%	15	93.75%	0	0.00%
1928	162	34.32%	310	65.68%	0	0.00%
1932	78	10.71%	642	88.19%	8	1.10%
1936	63	6.46%	903	92.62%	9	0.92%
1940	172	11.38%	1,340	88.62%	0	0.00%
1944	120	10.06%	1,004	84.16%	69	5.78%
1948	296	14.93%	1,588	80.08%	99	4.99%
1952	1,550	50.59%	1,508	49.22%	6	0.20%
1956	1,471	52.97%	1,287	46.34%	19	0.68%
1960	1,562	48.02%	1,642	50.48%	49	1.51%
1964	1,617	43.95%	2,059	55.97%	3	0.08%
1968	1,391	38.87%	938	26.21%	1,250	34.93%
1972	2,467	79.71%	602	19.45%	26	0.84%
1976	1,842	56.40%	1,382	42.31%	42	1.29%
1980	2,160	66.83%	1,021	31.59%	51	1.58%
1984	2,213	74.41%	752	25.29%	9	0.30%
1988	1,656	63.42%	947	36.27%	8	0.31%
1992	1,173	43.41%	942	34.86%	587	21.72%
1996	1,009	47.98%	872	41.46%	222	10.56%
2000	1,468	71.86%	556	27.21%	19	0.93%
2004	1,604	80.12%	391	19.53%	7	0.35%
2008	1,529	75.25%	477	23.47%	26	1.28%
2012	1,311	76.00%	398	23.07%	16	0.93%
2016	1,403	74.79%	420	22.39%	53	2.83%
2020	1,753	82.46%	358	16.84%	15	0.71%
2024	1,646	85.15%	283	14.64%	4	0.21%

United States Senate election results for Winkler County, Texas1
Year	Republican		Democratic		Third party(ies)	
Year	No.	%	No.	%	No.	%
2024	1,560	82.37%	303	16.00%	31	1.64%

United States Senate election results for Winkler County, Texas2
Year	Republican		Democratic		Third party(ies)	
Year	No.	%	No.	%	No.	%
2020	1,714	81.77%	338	16.13%	44	2.10%

Texas Gubernatorial election results for Winkler County
Year	Republican		Democratic		Third party(ies)	
Year	No.	%	No.	%	No.	%
2022	1,130	85.54%	177	13.40%	14	1.06%

== Transportation ==
=== Major highways ===
- State Highway 18
- State Highway 115
- State Highway 302

=== Airport ===
Winkler County is served by Winkler County Airport, located 3 miles (4.8 km) northwest of Wink.

== Communities ==
=== Cities ===
- Kermit (county seat)
- Monahans (mostly in Ward County)
- Wink

=== Hamlets ===
- Cowden Place

=== Ghost towns ===
- Cheyenne
- Hay Flat (partly in Loving County)
- Magwalt
- Vesrue

== Education ==
Kermit Independent School District and Wink-Loving Independent School District serve separate sections of the county.

All of Winkler County is zoned to Odessa College.

== Notable people ==
- Roy Orbison and his family moved to Wink in 1946, when he was 10.

== See also ==
- National Register of Historic Places listings in Winkler County, Texas
- Recorded Texas Historic Landmarks in Winkler County
