= Wink, Texas =

- City
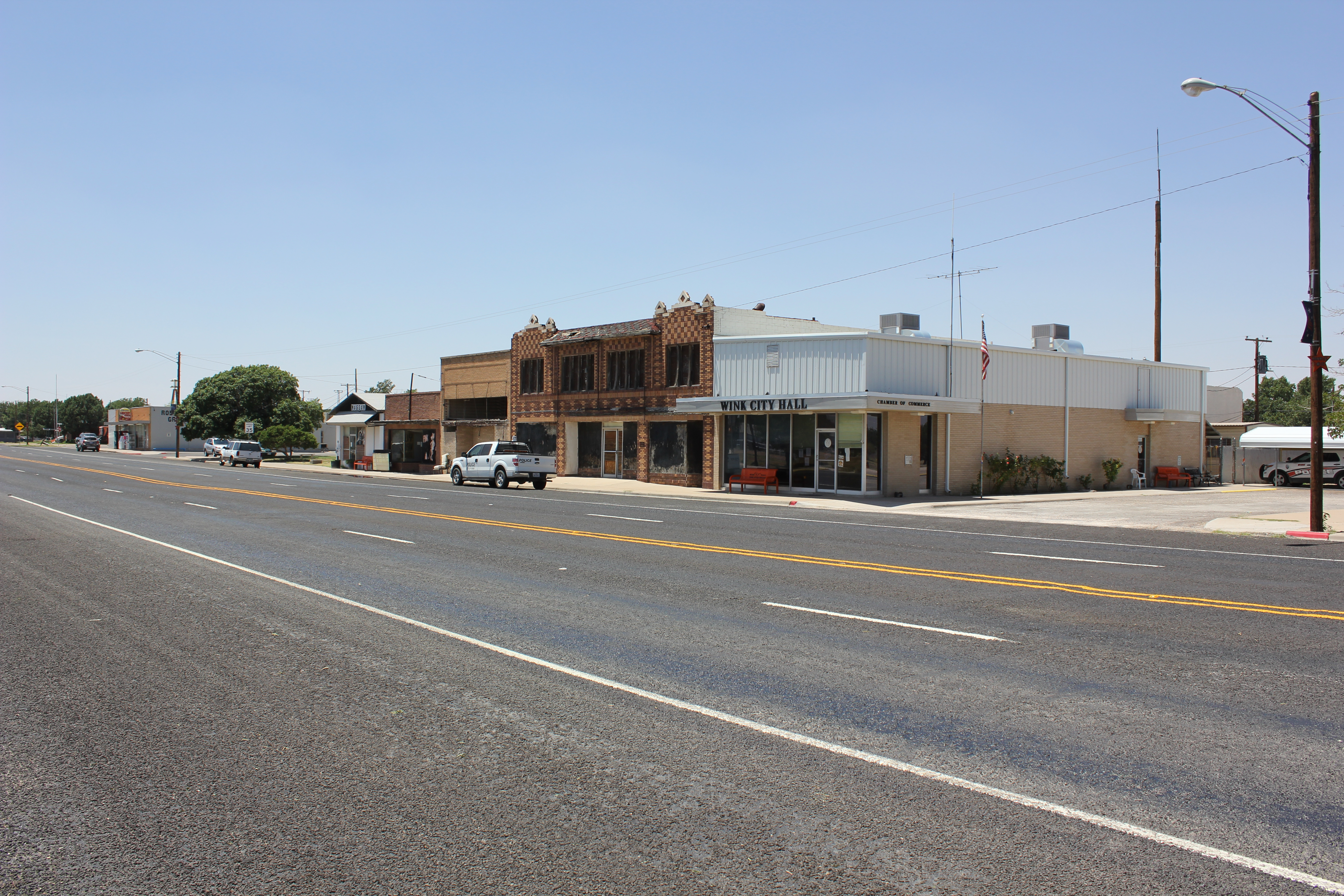
- Texas State Highway 115 in Wink

- Coordinates: 31°45′16″N 103°9′15″W
- Country: United States
- State: Texas
- County: Winkler

Area
  - Total: 1.17 sq mi (3.02 km^{2})
  - Land: 1.17 sq mi (3.02 km^{2})
  - Water: 0 sq mi (0.00 km^{2})
- Elevation: 2,792 ft (851 m)

Population (2020)
  - Total: 915
  - Density: 782.05/sq mi (301.95/km^{2})
- Time zone: UTC-6 (Central (CST))
  - Summer (DST): UTC-5 (CDT)
- ZIP code: 79789
- Area code: 432
- FIPS code: 48-79768
- GNIS feature ID: 1371804
- Website: cityofwink.com

Wink is a city in Winkler County, Texas, United States. Its population was 915 at the 2020 census. Wink was a temporary childhood home to singer and songwriter Roy Orbison, although he was born in Vernon, Texas. Orbison later described the major components of life in Wink as "football, oil fields, oil, grease, and sand", and in later years expressed relief that he was able to leave the desolate town. (Note: Ellis Amburn argues that Orbison was bullied and ostracized while in Wink and that after he became famous, he gave conflicting reports to local Texas newspapers claiming it was still home to him, while simultaneously maligning the town to Rolling Stone. (Amburn, pp. 11–20.))

== History ==
Wink began in 1926, when oil was discovered in Hendrick oilfield in Winkler County. By mid-1927, the Wink Townsite Company was selling lots in Horse Wells pasture of the T. G. Hendrick Ranch. The oil boom brought new people to Wink, causing a shortage of housing. Newcomers set up tents and built makeshift houses. Wink was originally named Winkler, Texas, for the county. When a post office was requested, postal authorities notified the applicant that a post office bearing that name already was in operation. The citizens shortened the name to Wink and received a post office in 1927. In that year, the first public school was organized, and a temporary building was constructed. A Sunday school was started by November 1927, and the population of the town was reported at 3,500. By 1929, that number climbed to 6,000. The actual population could have been around 10,000 to 25,000 people.

The boom brought lawlessness to Wink, including bootlegging, prostitution, and gambling. Even the city government, which was organized on June 4, 1928, came under the control of a well-organized underworld. On October 16, 1928, District Judge Charles Klapproth declared the incorporation election void, and the city government was reorganized. In December 1928, the first municipal building, a jail, was constructed. In 1929, the Texas-New Mexico Railroad built its tracks from Wink Junction to Wink, connecting the town to Monahans and New Mexico.

In the 1930s, the boom declined; the population hovered under 4,000, and the number of businesses fluctuated between 50 and 180. By 1933, the town was legally incorporated. Five hospitals and 15 doctors served injured oilfield workers, expectant mothers, and epidemic victims. Throughout the 1940s, the population continued to decline from 1,945 to 1,521, and the number of businesses decreased from 130 to 40.

In December 1947, Winkler County State Bank opened in Wink. Wink entered the 1950s with a stable community, including a population just over 1,500. The number of businesses varied in the decade from 25 to 50. In 1958, the railroad from Wink Junction to Wink was abandoned. During the early 1960s, the population rose to over 1,800, but dipped to under 1,200. By 1968, the number of businesses varied between 55 and 20.

In July 1960, the federal government approved an application by Wink for more than a million dollars in urban-renewal funds to upgrade and rehabilitate 221 acres (89 ha) within the city limits of Wink. National attention focused on the small oil town, which used the money for paving and curb and gutter work.

The population continued to decline to under 1,200 in the 1970s and 1980s. In the late 1970s, the oil economy improved, but the number of businesses slipped to a low of five by the late 1980s. At the end of the 1980s, Wink operated on a limited budget, based on low tax rates. In 1990, Wink remained a small oil town with a population of 1,189. This had fallen to 919 by 2000, but the 2010 count indicated a slight rebound, with 940 citizens residing in Wink. By 2020, the population had fallen to 915.

== Geography ==
Wink is located at 31°45′16″N 103°9′15″W (31.754497, 103.154117). According to the United States Census Bureau, the city has a total area of 1.2 square miles (3.1 km^{2}), all land.

=== Climate ===
According to the NOAA's National Weather Service, Wink is often one of the hottest locations in the United States for daily maximum shade temperatures. Temperatures throughout the summer often are above 105 °F (41 °C) and readings above 110 °F (43 °C) occur every summer.

== Demographics ==
Historical population
| Census | Pop. | Note | %± |
|---|---|---|---|
| 1930 | 3,963 | | — |
| 1940 | 1,945 | | −50.9% |
| 1950 | 1,521 | | −21.8% |
| 1960 | 1,863 | | 22.5% |
| 1970 | 1,023 | | −45.1% |
| 1980 | 1,182 | | 15.5% |
| 1990 | 1,189 | | 0.6% |
| 2000 | 919 | | −22.7% |
| 2010 | 940 | | 2.3% |
| 2020 | 915 | | −2.7% |
U.S. Decennial Census

=== 2020 census ===
As of the 2020 census, Wink had a population of 915, 333 households, and 262 families.

The median age was 35.2 years. 29.3% of residents were under the age of 18 and 11.9% of residents were 65 years of age or older. For every 100 females there were 92.6 males, and for every 100 females age 18 and over there were 88.6 males age 18 and over.

There were 333 households in Wink, of which 39.3% had children under the age of 18 living in them. Of all households, 50.5% were married-couple households, 17.4% were households with a male householder and no spouse or partner present, and 26.1% were households with a female householder and no spouse or partner present. About 21.3% of all households were made up of individuals and 9.3% had someone living alone who was 65 years of age or older.

There were 417 housing units, of which 20.1% were vacant. The homeowner vacancy rate was 1.7% and the rental vacancy rate was 25.6%.

0.0% of residents lived in urban areas, while 100.0% lived in rural areas.

Racial composition as of the 2020 census
| Race | Number | Percent |
|---|---|---|
| White | 694 | 75.8% |
| Black or African American | 7 | 0.8% |
| American Indian and Alaska Native | 8 | 0.9% |
| Asian | 1 | 0.1% |
| Native Hawaiian and Other Pacific Islander | 0 | 0.0% |
| Some other race | 85 | 9.3% |
| Two or more races | 120 | 13.1% |
| Hispanic or Latino (of any race) | 336 | 36.7% |

=== 2000 census ===
As of the 2000 census, 919 people, 341 households, and 260 families lived in the city. The population density was 809.1 inhabitants per square mile (312.4/km^{2}). The 437 housing units averaged 384.8 per square mile (148.0/km^{2}). The racial makeup of the city was 85.6% White, 0.9% African American, 0.3% Native American, 10.9% from other races, and 2.3% from two or more races. Hispanics or Latinos of any race were 23.1% of the population.

Of the 341 households, 42.5% had children under 18 living with them, 60.2% were married couples living together, 12.0% had a female householder with no husband present, and 23.5% were not families. About 22.3% of all households were made up of individuals, and 11.1% had someone living alone who was 65 or older. The average household size was 2.70 and the average family size was 3.15.

In the city, the age distribution was 31.8% under 18, 5.8% from 18 to 24, 28.5% from 25 to 44, 22.4% from 45 to 64, and 11.5% who were 65 or older. The median age was 37 years. For every 100 females, there were 84.9 males. For every 100 females 18 and over, there were 81.7 males.

The median income for a household in the city was $38,068, and for a family was $44,750. Males had a median income of $32,266 versus $20,526 for females. The per capita income for the city was $15,888. About 10.0% of families and 14.0% of the population were below the poverty line, including 17.6% of those under 18 and 20.8% of those 65 or over.

== Education ==
Wink is served by the Wink-Loving Independent School District.

All of Winkler County is zoned to Odessa College.

== Notable person ==
- Roy Orbison, singer/songwriter, grew up in Wink.
