= Ports-to-Plains Corridor =

Highway corridor in the United States

- High Priority Corridor 38

Route information
- Length: 1,368 mi (2,202 km)
- Existed: 1998–present
- Component highways: US 83 from Laredo, TX to Carrizo Springs, TX; US 277 from Carrizo Springs, TX to San Angelo, TX; US 87 from San Angelo, TX to Raton, NM; SH 158 from Sterling City, TX to Midland, TX; Loop 250 in Midland, TX; SH 349 from Midland, TX to Lamesa, TX; US 287 from Dumas, TX to Limon, CO; I-70 from Limon, CO to Denver, CO

Major junctions
- South end: Mexico-United States border in Laredo, TX
- I-35 / I-69W / US 59 / US 83 in Laredo, TX; I-35 / US 83 at Botines, TX; I-10 at Sonora, TX; I-20 in Midland, TX and Big Spring, TX; I-27 / US 62 / US 82 / US 84 in Lubbock, TX; I-27 / I-40 / US 60 / US 287 in Amarillo, TX; I-25 / US 64 / US 85 / US 87 at Raton, NM; I-70 / US 24 / US 40 / US 287 at Limon, CO
- North end: I-25 / I-70 / I-225 / I-270 / US 6 / US 36 / US 40 / US 85 / US 87 / US 287 in Denver, CO

Location
- Country: United States
- States: Texas; New Mexico; Oklahoma; Colorado

Highway system
- High-Priority Corridors

The Ports-to-Plains Corridor, also known as National Highway System High Priority Corridor 38, is a highway corridor between Laredo, Texas, at the United States–Mexico border, and Denver, Colorado. It is the southern third of the Ports-to-Plains Alliance. The reason for proposed improvements to this corridor is to expedite the transportation of goods and services from Mexico in the United States and vice versa. The proposed improvements gained momentum with the signing of the FY22 Omnibus Appropriations bill, which designated a section of the highway part of the interstate system. The Ports-to-Plains Corridor starts in South Texas and traverses through Texas, New Mexico, Oklahoma, and ends in Denver, Colorado.

The Intermodal Surface Transportation Efficiency Act of 1991 made the Ports-to-Plains Corridor National Highway System High Priority Corridor 38 in 1998. The High Priority designation, which applies to 90 routes or groups of routes nationally, does not create any additional design requirements and does not have a separate federal funding source.

== Route description ==
The Ports-to-Plains Corridor starts at the Mexico–United States border at a bridge crossing in Laredo, Texas, where it meets and runs concurrently with I-35, a six-lane freeway. North of Laredo, the route follows US Highway 83 (US 83), a two-lane highway to Carrizo Springs, Texas, where the route follows US 277 through Eagle Pass, Del Rio, Sonora, and San Angelo, Texas. North of San Angelo, the route follows US 87, a four-lane highway, through Big Spring and Lamesa and finally to Lubbock. Additionally, the corridor connects to Midland using State Highway 158 (SH 158) between Sterling City and Midland, Loop 250 in Midland, and SH 349 between Midland and Lamesa.

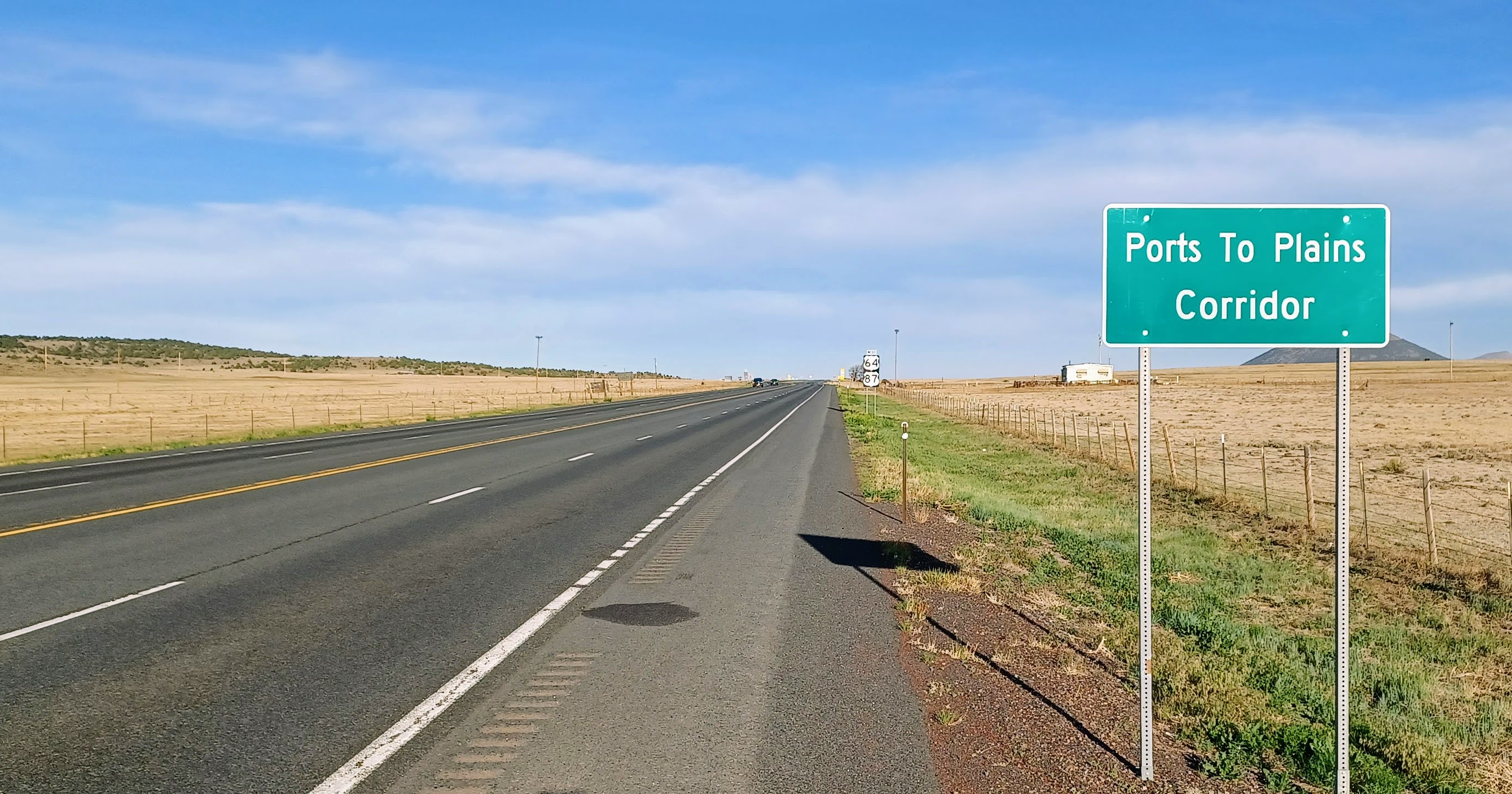
Ports-to-Plains Corridor sign west of Des Moines, New Mexico.

North of Lubbock, the route follows I-27 to Amarillo. North of Amarillo, the route is again marked as US 87 and returns to four-lane highway. At Dumas, a spur of the route extends northwest to Raton, New Mexico on mostly four-lane US 87.

The route continues north from Dumas using US 287. At the Oklahoma–Texas state line, the route continues along US 287. It passes through Boise City, Oklahoma, in the western panhandle.

Continuing north, the route follows US 287 through Springfield, Lamar, and Kit Carson, Colorado. North of Kit Carson, the route follows US 40 to Limon, Colorado, where it joins I-70 for the final leg into Denver, Colorado, where the highway ends at an interchange with I-25/US 6/US 85/US 87.

The cities of Laredo, Eagle Pass, and Del Rio are each located on the U.S.–Mexico Border and are gateways to trade between the two countries.

== History ==
In 2015, the Texas Department of Transportation (TxDOT) published the Initial Assessment Report: Extension of I-27/Ports-to-Plains Corridor. The purpose of this document is to provide a high-level overview of 1) existing conditions; 2) potential upgrade options; 3) a summary of public outreach and reaction; and, 4) potential next steps for TxDOT to consider toward further planning, public outreach and corridor development. The assessment report took into account crash hot spots, projected population change, and average daily traffic findings. Assessment results included: “Overwhelmingly, stakeholders expressed the urgency in TxDOT engaging in a new update of prior corridor studies, focusing on an extension of I-27, rather than upgrading incrementally the I-27/P2P corridor.” Further, the Assessment stated: “Investments have been made within the corridor to improve safety and mobility; however, there are still sections that need to be addressed.” It found: “Some areas along the corridor have seen notable population growth and growth in the number of passenger cars and especially trucks and are projected to continue to grow. This translates to more demands on the transportation system.”

In 2018 TxDOT completed the Texas Freight Mobility Plan. The stated purpose is: “provides the state with a blueprint for facilitating continued economic growth through a comprehensive, multimodal strategy for addressing freight transportation needs and moving goods efficiently and safely throughout the state." The Plan identified priority strategic projects and initiatives based on current and future freight volumes, trends and economic opportunities. The I-27 Extension – from Lubbock to Laredo was identified as one of two Strategic Projects. The Plan stated that I-27 would be a catalyst to spur economic development in this part of the state and support agricultural and energy sector development, the state’s economic engine, and that the I-27 extension would provide the only major north-south corridor in Texas west of I-35, and it would intersect three major east-west routes: I-10, I-20 and I-40. It also recommended that TxDOT complete a more detailed study of the extension to determine whether an incremental improvement approach or a complete interstate facility approach would meet safety and mobility needs.

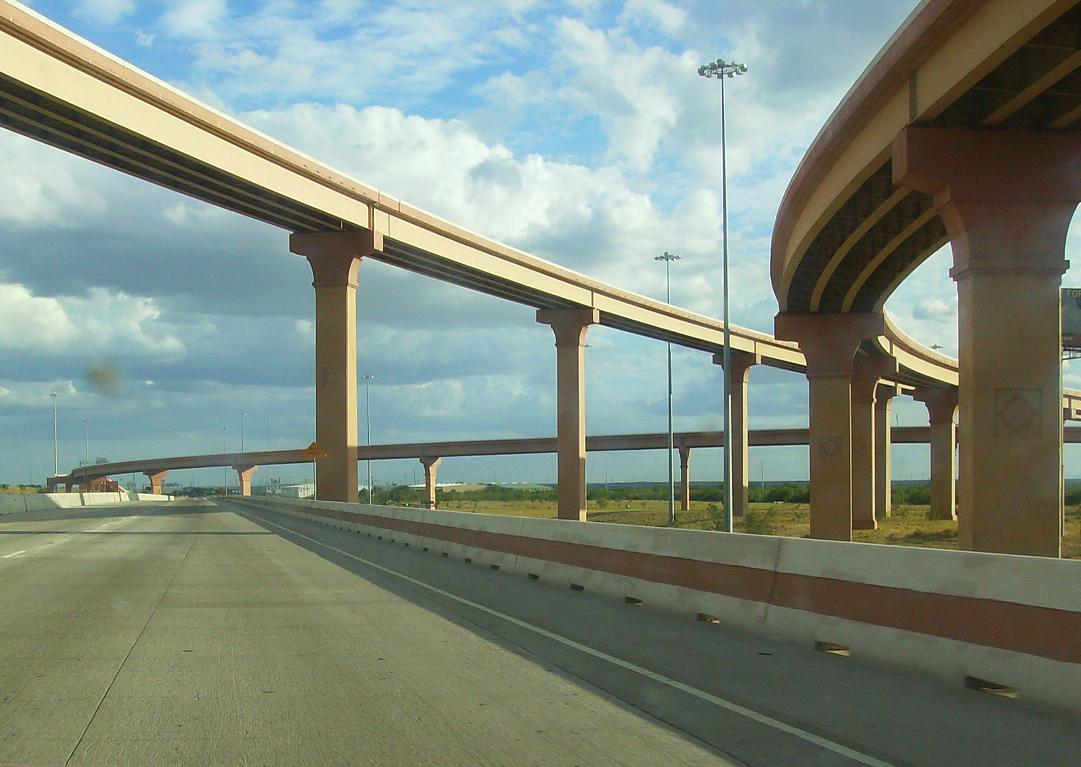
The stack interchange between I-35 (along with US 83) and Loop 20 (along with both I-69W and US 59) in Laredo, Texas

In June 2019, Governor Greg Abbott signed Texas House Bill 1079, which directed TxDOT to conduct a comprehensive study of the Ports-to-Plains Corridor. The Ports-to-Plains Advisory Committee was established on August 29, 2019.

Findings by the Ports-to-Plains Advisory Committee showed that a 350-mile long stretch of two-lane roadway and 95-mile stretch of undivided four-lane road way had crash rates that were 47% to 98% higher than the national average.

In March 2024, TxDOT released an implementation plan that listed all the projects that were planned for the I-27 project in the state.

=== Numbering ===
On March 15, 2022, the 2022 Consolidated Appropriations Act was signed by President Joe Biden that added the extension of I-27 north to Raton, New Mexico, and south to Laredo to the Interstate Highway System. A bill introduced in March 2023 would explicitly designate the extension as I-27 with two auxiliary routes numbered I-227 and I-327. I-227 is proposed to be routed via SH 158 from Sterling City to Midland and SH 349 from Midland to Lamesa; I-327 would utilize US 287 from Dumas to the Oklahoma state line. It would also formally name the Interstate the Ports-to-Plains Corridor. The bill was introduced by legislators from both Texas and New Mexico. On August 1, 2023, the legislation passed through the U.S. Senate with some slight modifications; I-227 was redesignated as I-27W with I-27 between Sterling City and Lamesa redesignated as I-27E and I-327 was redesignated as I-27N. The act was passed again by the Senate in March 2024 after some changes were made in the U.S. House of Representatives in December 2023.

=== Interstate extension ===
On September 5, 2024, the Federal Highway Administration (FHWA) approved a 4.2-mile (6.8 km) southern extension of I-27 from its previous terminus at Loop 289 to 0.1 miles (0.16 km) north of County Road 7500, the new limit for access control on the US 87 freeway north of that point. The Texas Transportation Commission would later also approve the extension at their meeting on September 26, 2024.

== See also ==
- Caprock Chief, a former proposed passenger rail route along the corridor
