= Texas State Highway 140 =

State highway in Texas

State Highway 140

Route information
- Maintained by TxDOT
- Length: 2.337 mi (3.761 km)
- Existed: 2012–present

Major junctions
- West end: Bus. SH 349 in Midland
- East end: I-20 / SH 158 in Midland

Location
- Country: United States
- State: Texas
- Counties: Midland

Highway system
- Highways in Texas; Interstate; US; State; Former; Toll; Loops; Spurs; FM/RM; Park; Rec
← SH 139	→ SH 141

State Highway 140 (SH 140) is a 2.3-mile-long (3.7 km) state highway located entirely in Midland, Texas. It is located along Florida Avenue and Garden City Highway in the southeastern portion of the city beginning at its western terminus at Business Highway 349-C (Bus. SH 349-C), also known as Big Spring Street and continues east to the interchange of Interstate 20 (I-20) and SH 158. The road on which SH 140 travels had previously been designated as three other highways over time: SH 158, State Highway Loop 546, and Bus. SH 158-B. It received its current number in 2012.

== Route description ==
SH 140 begins at the signalized intersection of Big Spring Street and West Florida Avenue. Big Spring Street travels north and south and carries the designation of Bus. SH 349-C, formerly SH 349; West Florida Street travels west as a city-maintained street. The state-maintained West Florida Street travels due east from this intersection with speed limit of 35 miles per hour (56 km/h). At the intersection with Main Street, the road name becomes East Florida Avenue and the speed limit increases to 40 miles per hour (64 km/h). At Dallas Street, the speed limit increases again to 45 miles per hour (72 km/h). SH 140 curves slightly to the south at the Lamesa Road intersection; at this point, the road name becomes Garden City Highway, the speed limit increases a final time to 50 miles per hour (80 km/h), and Farm to Market Road 307 (FM 307) can be accessed one block to the north of this intersection. After a long straightaway, there is a signalized intersection with South Fairgrounds Road; the road to the south is FM 715 and provides a shortcut to I-20 and SH 158 westbound. About 0.2 miles (0.32 km) later, SH 140 reaches its end at the westbound frontage road for I-20 and SH 158. The interchange complex is part of I-20's exit 138. I-20 and SH 158 form a concurrency west of here, while SH 158 continues east along Garden City Road towards the eastbound frontage road and Garden City.

For its entire length, SH 140 is a four-lane undivided asphalt road with a center turn lane. Commercial businesses, open and abandoned, line both sides of the road throughout the entirety of the highway.

== History ==
The road on which SH 140 is now designated has been a part of the Texas state highway system since at least the 1930s. From December 21, 1935, until 1984, this highway was a part of SH 158 which formerly traveled through downtown Midland. On April 9, 1984, SH 158 was rerouted onto I-20 south of the city and the old route through the city including current SH 140 became State Highway Loop 546. This number would last for approximately six years until it was replaced in its entirety by Bus. SH 158-B on June 21, 1990. After a redesignation of various highways in Midland on June 30, 2011, Bus. SH 158-B was moved onto SH 58 in western Midland and the portion of the old business highway between Bus. SH 349-C and I-20/SH 158 became SH 140.

The number was previously used from June 26, 1929, on a short highway branching from SH 31 in Smith County, southwest of Tyler to the Tyler Fish Hatchery. On January 8, 1934, SH 140 was to be gravelled, but was to be removed from the state highway system when construction was complete. This happened on July 30, 1934, but the road was restored as Spur 164 on February 28, 1945.

== Junction list ==
The entire highway is in Midland, Midland County.

mi	km	Destinations	Notes
0.0	0.0	Bus. SH 349 (Big Spring Street) / West Florida Avenue	
2.1	3.4	FM 715 south (South Fairgrounds Road)	Northern terminus of FM 715
2.3	3.7	I-20 / SH 158 (Frontage Road / Garden City Highway)	Exit 138 on I-20
1.000 mi = 1.609 km; 1.000 km = 0.621 mi
