= Texas State Highway 58 =

State highway in Texas

State Highway 58

Route information
- Maintained by TxDOT
- Length: 1.83 mi (2.95 km)
- Existed: 2009–2011
- History: Redesignated as BS 158-B in 2011

Major junctions
- South end: I-20 in Midland
- I-20 BL in Midland
- North end: Spur 268 / Bus. SH 158 in Midland

Location
- Country: United States
- State: Texas
- Counties: Midland

Highway system
- Highways in Texas; Interstate; US; State; Former; Toll; Loops; Spurs; FM/RM; Park; Rec
← SH 57	→ US 59

State Highway 58 (SH 58) was a state highway in the U.S. state of Texas maintained by the Texas Department of Transportation (TxDOT). The highway was located within the city of Midland in Midland County. The route began at I-20 in south Midland and follows Cotton Flat Rd. and S. Garfield St.) to Spur 268 and Bus. SH 158 in central Midland and intersected BL I-20 in central Midland. The route was designated in 2009, and completed by 2011. The route was decommissioned in 2011 and became a rerouted Business State Highway 158-B. The SH 58 designation was assigned to a highway along the Gulf Coast in the 1920s and 1930s.

== History ==
Historic SH 58

SH 58 was designated on August 21, 1923, over a route from Ganado through Bay City, Columbia, and Angleton to a point on the mainland just east of Galveston, replacing SH 19A. On March 19, 1928, the western portion of the route was rerouted to the Army Camp near Palacios from Bay City. The eastern portion was rerouted through Alvin between Angleton and Galveston. on February 20, 1929, the section from Ganado to Midfield was restored as a state highway, with no number, and this was eliminated on March 19, 1930. On June 25, 1930, the route was truncated to end at Alvin as the route from Alvin to Galveston was transferred to SH 38. On April 3, 1931, a branch west to Ganado was added, but that was cancelled on January 20, 1932.

Historic SH 58 Spur

SH 58 Spur was designated on May 28, 1933 from SH 58 to the Retrieve Prison Farm. On April 10, 1934, the route designation was canceled, and the highway was added to SH 35 as an extension. SH 58 Spur was redesignated as SH 35 Spur.

The route in Midland was designated on May 28, 2009. Construction of the new roadway between Cotton Flat Rd. and Carter Ave. began in May 2010. It was completed by June 30, 2011, but it was cancelled that day. This route became Business State Highway 158-B in 2011 when it was rerouted.

== Route description ==
The 1.83-mile (2.95 km) route began at I-20 in south Midland and continued a short distance northward along Cotton Flat Rd. before turning to the northeast along a five-lane extension of S. Garfield St. The 1.045-mile (1.682 km) extension joined the already constructed segment of S. Garfield St. at Carter Ave. The route continued along S. Garfield Ave. crossing the Union Pacific Railroad and I-20 Bus. before terminating at Spur 268 and SH 158 Bus. in central Midland.

== Major intersections ==
The entire route is in Midland, Midland County.

mi	km	Destinations	Notes
0	0.0	I-20 (W. Front St.) – Odessa, Abilene	Southern terminus
1.2	1.9	I-20 BL – Odessa	
1.8	2.9	Spur 268 (W. Wall St.) / Bus. SH 158 (N. Garfield St., W. Wall St.)	Northern terminus
1.000 mi = 1.609 km; 1.000 km = 0.621 mi
