= Texas State Highway 350 =

Highway in Texas

State Highway 350
- SH 350, highlighted in red

Route information
- Maintained by TxDOT
- Length: 47.897 mi (77.083 km)
- Existed: 1943–present

Major junctions
- South end: I-20 BL in Big Spring
- I-20 in Big Spring
- North end: US 180 / Bus. US 84 in Snyder

Location
- Country: United States
- State: Texas

Highway system
- Highways in Texas; Interstate; US; State; Former; Toll; Loops; Spurs; FM/RM; Park; Rec
← SH 349	→ SH 351

State Highway 350 (SH 350) begins in Big Spring and runs in a mostly northeastward direction to Snyder.

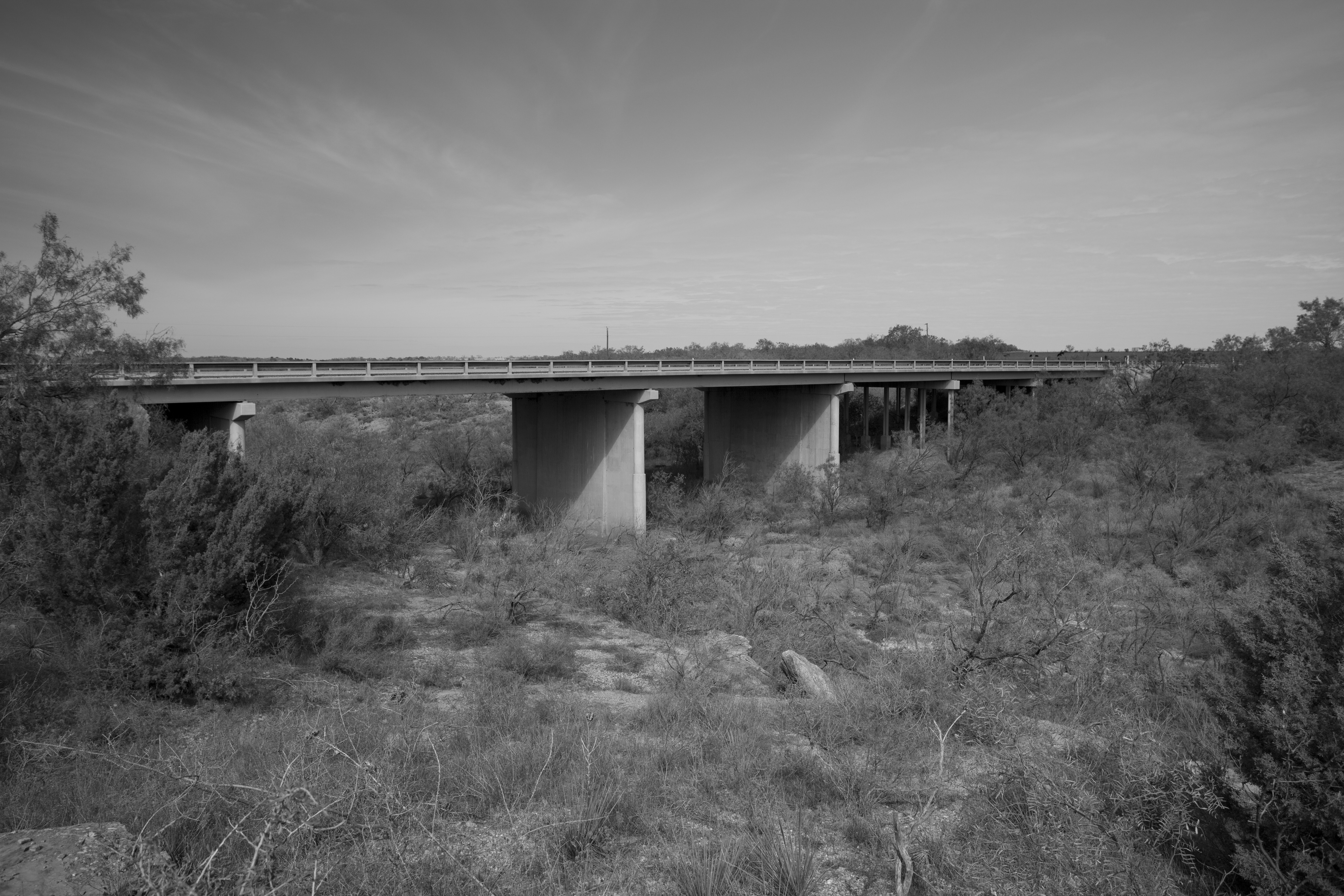
Colorado River crossing along State Highway 350

== Route description ==
Beginning at a junction with Business Loop I-20 at Big Spring in Howard County, SH 350 intersects Interstate 20 on the northern edge of the town. The highway is known as Owen Street in Big Spring. SH 350 then runs northeast past Howard County municipal airport to its final junction with US 180 at Snyder in Scurry County, where it is known as College Avenue. The route traverses Howard, Mitchell and Scurry Counties. Except for the portions in Big Spring and Snyder, most of the terrain covered by the highway is lightly populated agricultural and oil country. The route has remained essentially unchanged since its original designation on August 23, 1943.

== Major intersections ==
County	Location	mi	km	Destinations	Notes
Howard	Big Spring			I-20 BL east (4th Street)	
Howard	Big Spring			I-20 BL west (3rd Street)	
Howard	Big Spring			I-20 – Midland, Colorado City	I-20 exit 178
Howard				FM 700 – Gail	
Howard				FM 820 south – Coahoma	
Howard				FM 1205 north	
Mitchell				FM 1298 north – Lake J.B. Thomas	
Mitchell				FM 1229	
Scurry	Ira			FM 1606 – Dunn	
Scurry	Ira			FM 1609 north	
Scurry				FM 2763 east – Western Texas College	
Scurry	Snyder			FM 1605 east (37th Street) / FM 1607 west	
Scurry	Snyder			US 180 (25th Street) / Bus. US 84 (College Avenue)	
1.000 mi = 1.609 km; 1.000 km = 0.621 mi
