= Texas State Highway Spur 588 =

State highway in Texas

State Highway Spur 588
- Spur 588 highlighted in red

Route information
- Maintained by TxDOT
- Length: 2.212 mi (3.560 km)
- Existed: April 26, 1989–present

Major junctions
- South end: I-20 BL in Odessa
- North end: SH 191 in Odessa

Location
- Country: United States
- State: Texas

Highway system
- Highways in Texas; Interstate; US; State; Former; Toll; Loops; Spurs; FM/RM; Park; Rec
← Spur 581	→ Spur 589

Spur 588 is a state highway spur in Odessa, Texas. Spur 588 runs from its northern terminus at SH 191, along Faudree Rd. through the Country Club area to its southern terminus at Interstate 20 Business. Spur 588 was created on April 26, 1989.

== Route description ==
Spur 588 begins at an intersection with I-20 Business in Odessa, Midland County, heading northwest on four-lane undivided Faudree Road. The road passes between the Odessa Country Club to the west and commercial areas to the east before running between the golf course and residential neighborhoods. The highway continues past more housing subdivisions with some fields, crossing into Ector County. Spur 588 reaches its northern terminus at an interchange with SH 191.

== History ==
Spur 588 was created in 1989 to connect US 80 (now I-20 Business) to SH 191. It has remained on its current alignment since.

== Future ==
The Midland/Odessa Transportation Organization, or MOTOR, has plans to extend Spur 588 from its current Northern Terminus at SH 191 northward to SH 158 near Gardendale, and to extend it southward from its southern terminus at Interstate 20 Business to a new interchange at I-20 still in Odessa.

== Major intersections ==
County	Location	mi	km	Destinations	Notes
Midland	Odessa	0.000	0.000	I-20 BL	
Ector	Odessa	2.212	3.560	SH 191	Interchange
1.000 mi = 1.609 km; 1.000 km = 0.621 mi
