= Business routes of Interstate 20 =

Interstate 20 Business

Location
- Country: United States

Highway system
- Interstate Highway System; Main; Auxiliary; Suffixed; Business; Future

Interstate 20 has 15 business routes located in Texas and one additional route in South Carolina:

- Business routes of Interstate 20 in Texas
- Interstate 20 Business (Florence, South Carolina)
