= Texas State Highway 191 =

Highway in Texas

State Highway 191
- Sergeant Michael Naylor Memorial Highway
- SH 191, highlighted in red

Route information
- Maintained by TxDOT
- Length: 17.75 mi (28.57 km)
- Existed: 1977–present

Major junctions
- West end: Spur 450 in Odessa
- US 385 in Odessa
- East end: SH 158 / Bus. SH 158 / Loop 250 in Midland

Location
- Country: United States
- State: Texas
- Counties: Ector, Midland

Highway system
- Highways in Texas; Interstate; US; State; Former; Toll; Loops; Spurs; FM/RM; Park; Rec
← SH 190	→ SH 192

State Highway 191 (SH 191) is a Texas state highway running from the north side of Odessa east to the western edge of Midland. The highway is usually used as a reliever route for local traffic between the two cities, as opposed to I-20 a few miles to the south.

== Route description ==
SH 191 begins at an intersection with Spur 450 in western Odessa, just short of SH 302 and Loop 338. The highway runs east along 42nd Street, soon crossing U.S. Highway 385 (US 385). In the eastern part of the city, SH 191 crosses by Music City Mall and the University of Texas at the Permian Basin and picks up freeway status at the eastern leg of Loop 338. The highway passes through mostly rural land, with some subdivisions nearby. The highway exits the Odessa city limits and enters into Midland County. SH 191 crosses SH 349 just north of Midland International Airport and enters into Midland. A few miles to the northeast of here, SH 158 joins the highway, with the two running together until Loop 250, where SH 191 ends, but the mainlanes continues east into the city as a business route of SH 158.

== History ==
SH 191 was originally designated on November 28, 1932, on a route from Albany south to Coleman. On July 15, 1935, SH 191 was cancelled. On February 21, 1937, the section south of SH 36 was restored, and the remainder was restored on May 18, 1937. On September 26, 1939, this route had been transferred to US 183. The current SH 191 was designated on August 31, 1977, from SH 158 southwest to Loop 338 & Spur 492.

Spur 492 was designated on June 4, 1970, from Loop 338 westward to Grandview Avenue, replacing FM 2399 and extending the road 0.5 miles (0.80 km) west. On August 4, 1970, Spur 492 was extended west to another point on Loop 338. This mileage was transferred to SH 191 on April 26, 1983.

== Junction list ==
All exits are unnumbered.

County	Location	mi	km	Destinations	Notes
Ector	Odessa	0.0	0.0	Spur 450 to SH 302	
Ector	Odessa	2.0	3.2	US 385 (Andrews Highway)	
Ector	Odessa	5.7	9.2	Loop 338	West end of freeway
Ector	Odessa	6.9	11.1	Billy Hext Road	
Ector	Odessa	8.0	12.9	Spur 588 (Faudree Road) / Yukon Road	
Midland		12.0	19.3	SH 349 / FM 1788 – UT Permian Basin CEED	Access to Midland International Air and Space Port
Midland		13.8	22.2	County Road 1275	
Midland	Midland	17.7	28.5	SH 158 west / Avalon Drive – Sports Complex	West end of SH 158 overlap
Midland	Midland	18.3	29.5	SH 158 east / Bus. SH 158 east / Loop 250	East end of SH 158 overlap; continues east as Bus. SH 158
1.000 mi = 1.609 km; 1.000 km = 0.621 mi: Concurrency terminus
