= Midland Airpark =

- IATA: MDD; ICAO: KMDD; FAA LID: MDD

Summary
- Airport type: Public
- Owner: City of Midland
- Serves: Midland, Texas
- Location: 901 Veterans Airpark Lane; Midland, TX 79705
- Elevation AMSL: 2,803 ft / 854 m
- Coordinates: 32°02′12″N 102°06′04″W

Map

Runways
Direction	Length		Surface
Direction	ft	m	Surface
7/25	5,022	1,531	Asphalt
16/34	3,977	1,212	Asphalt

Statistics (2008)
- Aircraft operations: 28,110
- Based aircraft: 90
- Source: Federal Aviation Administration

Midland Airpark (IATA: MDD, ICAO: KMDD, FAA LID: MDD) is a public airport three miles north of Midland, in Midland County, Texas. The FAA's National Plan of Integrated Airport Systems for 2009–2013 categorized it as a general aviation facility.

== Facilities ==
Midland Airpark covers 816 acres (330 ha) at an elevation of 2,803 feet (854 m). It has two asphalt runways: Runway 7/25 is 5,022 by 75 feet (1,531 x 23 m) and Runway 16/34 is 3,977 by 75 feet (1,212 x 23 m).

In the year ending August 13, 2008, the airport had 28,110 aircraft operations, averaging 77 per day, with 93% classified as general aviation, 7% as air taxi, and less than 1% as military. At that time, 90 aircraft were based at this airport, comprising 81.1% single-engine and 13.3% multi-engine airplanes, 2.2% jet, and 3.3% helicopter.

== See also ==
- List of airports in Texas
