= Texas State Highway Loop 250 =

Highway in Texas

State Highway Loop 250

Route information
- Maintained by TxDOT
- Length: 12.245 mi (19.706 km)
- Existed: 1977–present

Major junctions
- West end: I-20 / SH 158 / SH 349 in Midland
- East end: I-20 near Midland

Location
- Country: United States
- State: Texas
- Counties: Midland

Highway system
- Highways in Texas; Interstate; US; State; Former; Toll; Loops; Spurs; FM/RM; Park; Rec
← Loop 249	→ Loop 251

Texas State Highway Loop 250 (Loop 250) is a bypass of northern Midland. The highway runs along the western, northern and eastern edges of the city. From the western terminus at I-20/SH 158/SH 349 to Bus. SH 349, the highway is a freeway.

== Route description ==
Loop 250 begins at an interchange with I-20/SH 158/SH 349 in southwest Midland, with SH 158 beginning at concurrency with Loop 250. The highway runs near many industrial parks with exits for Industrial Avenue and BL I-20 (W. Wall Street). Near Thomason Drive, the freeway passes near many subdivisions on the city's west side. The concurrency with SH 158 ends at an interchange with SH 191 near Grande Communications Stadium and Security Bank Ballpark. Near Wadley Avenue, the freeway turns from a more north direction towards the east. The corridor of Loop 250 from Midland Drive to Garfield Street is the sight of many restaurants and shopping centers, including Midland Park Mall. Between Garfield Street and Bus. SH 349 (Big Spring Street), the southern frontage road serves as the northern boundary for Midland Airpark. Just east of Fairgrounds Road, freeway status ends and Loop 250 continues as a divided highway. Phases of new projects are planned and/or underway to extend the highway's freeway status further east and to the south, following the planned and existing route. The highway leaves the city limits of Midland just east of County Road 1160. Loop 250 has an interchange with BL I-20 before a terminus at I-20, east of Midland.

== History ==

Loop 250 was originally designated on March 31, 1952 and ran from US 183 near the Montopolis Bridge to US 81 in north Austin. This highway was cancelled on August 17, 1954 with the mileage being transferred to US 183. The Loop 250 designation was used again as Spur 250 on August 27, 1959 as a connector route between Interstate 45 and U.S. Route 75 in Texas near Mossy Grove. This route was cancelled on October 8, 1965 with the mileage being transferred to FM 2989. The current Loop 250 was designated on August 31, 1977. On July 24, 1984, it replaced FM 1369, which was decommissioned, and the section of FM 868 from Loop 250 to SH 349.

== Junction list ==
The entire highway is in Midland County.

Location	mi	km	Destinations	Notes
Midland	0.0	0.0	I-20 / SH 158 east – El Paso, Garden City	At-grade interchange; west end of SH 158 overlap
Midland	0.2	0.32	I-20 Frontage Road	Westbound exit and eastbound entrance
Midland	0.3	0.48	Industrial Avenue	Eastbound exit and westbound entrance
Midland	0.9	1.4	I-20 BL – Odessa, Midland	Former US 80
Midland	1.3	2.1	Anetta Drive	Eastbound exit and westbound entrance
Midland	2.1	3.4	Thomason Drive	
Midland	3.2	5.1	SH 158 west / SH 191 west / Bus. SH 158 east – Andrews, Odessa, Midland	East end of SH 158 overlap
Midland	4.3	6.9	Wadley Avenue, Tremont Avenue	
Midland	5.7	9.2	FM 868 (Midland Drive)	
Midland	6.7	10.8	Midkiff Road – Midland Park Mall	
Midland	7.9	12.7	Garfield Street – Midland College, Midland Airpark	
Midland	8.8	14.2	A Street	Westbound exit via the Lamesa Road exit
Midland	9.5	15.3	Bus. SH 349 – Lamesa, Rankin	Westbound exit via the Lamesa Road exit
Midland	9.9	15.9	Lamesa Road	
Midland	10.7	17.2	Fairgrounds Road	East end of freeway
	11.8	19.0	Todd Drive	Right-in, right-out intersection; future interchange
	12.8	20.6	Elkins Road, E County Road 60	West end of freeway
	14.0	22.5	N County Road 1140	
	15.3	24.6	I-20 BL – Big Spring, Midland	Former US 80
	16.3	26.2	I-20 – Abilene, El Paso; CR 1130	At-grade interchange; roadway continues south as CR 1130
1.000 mi = 1.609 km; 1.000 km = 0.621 mi: Concurrency terminus; Incomplete access

== See also ==
- List of state highway loops in Texas
