= KTXO =

Coordinates: 31°52′02″N 102°39′18″W

- Goldsmith, Texas; United States
- Broadcast area: Odessa, Texas
- Frequency: 94.7 MHz
- Branding: La Invasora 94.7

Programming
- Format: Regional Mexican

Ownership
- Owner: Manuel Herrera
- Sister stations: La Hacienda Entertainment, Inc.

History
- First air date: 2010
- Call sign meaning: Texas Odessa

Technical information
- Licensing authority: FCC
- Facility ID: 164215
- Class: A
- ERP: 6,000 watts
- HAAT: 97 meters (318 ft)

Links
- Public license information: Public file; LMS
- Webcast: Listen live
- Website: la947.com

KTXO (94.7 FM) is a radio station licensed to Goldsmith, Texas. The station broadcasts a Regional Mexican format. Studios are located in Midland, while the transmitter is sited near Goldsmith. The station is run and programmed by Aldama Media LLC, a company owned by La Hacienda Entertainment Inc.
