= Texas State Highway 349 =

Highway in Texas

State Highway 349
- SH 349, highlighted in red

Route information
- Maintained by TxDOT
- Length: 194.427 mi (312.900 km)
- Existed: 1943–present

Major junctions
- South end: US 90 at Dryden
- I-10 near Sheffield; US 190 at Iraan; US 67 at Rankin; I-20 at Midland
- North end: US 87 / US 180 near Lamesa

Location
- Country: United States
- State: Texas
- Counties: Terrell, Pecos, Crockett, Upton, Midland, Martin, Dawson

Highway system
- Highways in Texas; Interstate; US; State; Former; Toll; Loops; Spurs; FM/RM; Park; Rec
← SH 348	→ SH 350

State Highway 349 (SH 349) is a 194.43-mile-long (312.90 km) state highway in the western part of Texas, United States.

== History ==
The original formation of the highway on August 3, 1943, included only the section from Rankin to Midland, replacing FM 9. On April 30, 1947, FM 306 and FM 177 were redesignated to form the segment of SH 349 from Midland to near Lamesa. The section from Sheffield to Rankin was added on October 24, 1956, by redesignating part of SH 51.

The part of SH 349 south of Sheffield was Farm to Market Road 1217, which was designated on July 14, 1949, from Dryden northward 5 miles (8 km). FM 1217 was extended to the northeast 3.2 miles (5.1 km) on May 23, 1951, 7.0 miles (11.3 km) on December 18, 1951, 14.0 miles (22.5 km) on December 17, 1952, and 2.3 miles (3.7 km) on April 24, 1954. The designation was extended 10.0 miles (16.1 km) on September 29, 1954, to the end of FM 1749, which was cancelled and combined with FM 1217, adding 17.8 miles (28.6 km) and bringing its southern terminus to Sheffield. On December 13, 1956, FM 1217 was signed, but not designated, as part of SH 349. On August 29, 1990, FM 1217 was officially renumbered as SH 349. On July 31, 2003, SH 349 was rerouted around Midland.

In December 2014, the Texas Transportation Commission approved an extension of the SH 349 designation south of Lamesa, from the current northern terminus at SH 137 eastward to US 87. Construction of the extension started in May 2017 and was completed just over two years later in mid-2019.

== Route description ==
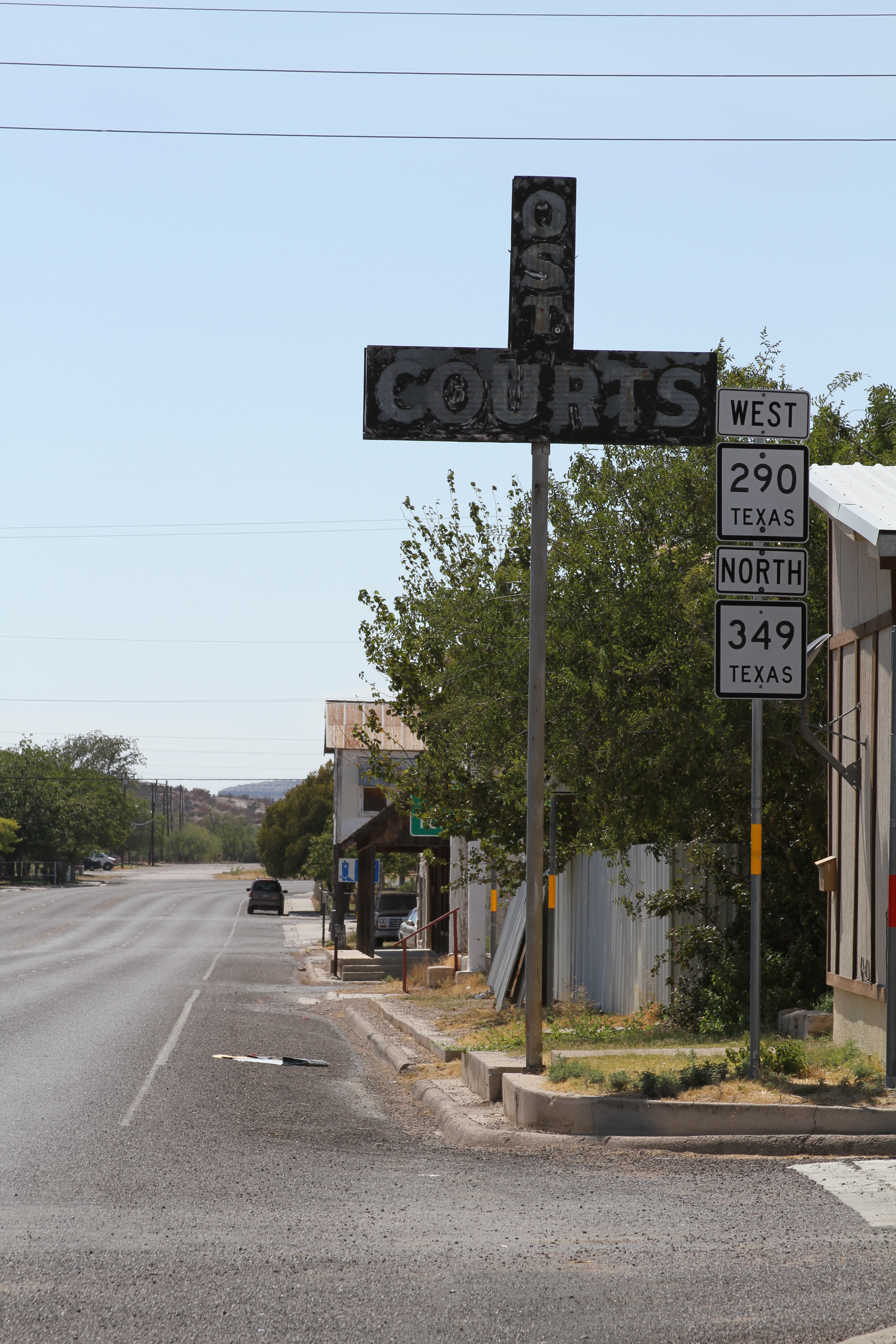
The south end of SH 349's concurrency with SH 290 in Sheffield.

SH 349 runs generally northward from its originating junction with U.S. Highway 90 at the community of Dryden (population 13) near the Rio Grande, the southern border of the state. The road passes west of Fort Lancaster to Sheffield and a junction with Interstate 10. SH 349 then runs along the Pecos River to Iraan, where it is co-routed for a few miles with U.S. Highway 190. The road then proceeds northward to a junction and brief co-routing with U.S. Highway 67 at Rankin. SH 349 continues northward to the relatively heavily populated area of Midland.

SH 349 formerly bisected Midland directly through the city center. However, the highway has been redesignated to loop around Midland to the west, by co-routing it with portions of Interstate 20 (and State Highway 158) and Farm to Market Road 1788. A new section of highway, a so-called "reliever route", was opened on December 10, 2009, and was named the Nadine and Tom Craddick Highway after State Rep. Tom Craddick and his wife, who played a large role in creating the highway. (This new section of SH 349 is part of the "La Entrada al Pacifico Corridor" trade route from west Texas to Mexico). The portion of SH 349 that ran directly through Midland was redesignated as Business State Highway 349-C (BS 349-C) in 2003. North of Midland, SH 349 proceeds generally northward to its final junction with State Highway 137, just south of Lamesa. Counties traversed by the highway include Terrell, Pecos, Crockett, Upton, Midland, Martin and Dawson. With the exception of the metropolitan area of Midland, most of the terrain covered by the highway is sparsely populated ranch country.

== Future ==
On March 15, 2022, a bill was signed by President Joe Biden that added the extension of I-27 north to Raton, New Mexico, and south to Laredo to the Interstate Highway System utilizing the US 87, US 277 and US 83 corridors. A bill introduced in 2023 would explicitly designate the extension as I-27 with two auxiliary routes numbered I-227 and I-327. I-227 is proposed to be routed via SH 158 from Sterling City to Midland and SH 349 from Midland to Lamesa; I-327 would utilize US 287 from Dumas to the Oklahoma state line. On August 1, 2023, the legislation passed through the U.S. Senate with some slight modifications; I-227 was redesignated as I-27W with I-27 between Sterling City and Lamesa redesignated as I-27E and I-327 was redesignated as I-27N.

== Junction list ==
County	Location	mi	km	Destinations	Notes
Terrell	Dryden	0.0	0.0	US 90 – Sanderson, Del Rio	Southern terminus
Terrell		29.5	47.5	RM 3166 east	
Terrell		47.9	77.1	RM 2400 west to US 285	
Pecos	Sheffield	58.9	94.8	SH 290 east (Main Street) – Ozona	South end of SH 290 overlap
Pecos		63.6	102.4	I-10 – Fort Stockton, Ozona	North end of SH 290 overlap; I-10 exit 325
Pecos	Iraan	76.9	123.8	US 190 east – Eldorado	South end of US 190 overlap
Pecos		81.4	131.0	US 190 west – Fort Stockton	North end of US 190 overlap
Crockett	No major junctions				
Upton		99.7	160.5	US 67 south – Fort Stockton	South end of US 67 overlap
Upton	Rankin	103.3	166.2	SH 329 west – Crane	
Upton	Rankin	103.8	167.0	US 67 north – Big Lake	North end of US 67 overlap
Upton		104.7	168.5	Spur 576 south	
Upton		110.7	178.2	RM 1555 east – Texon	
Upton		125.2	201.5	RM 2401 north – Midkiff	
Midland		137.4	221.1	FM 1379 north	
Midland		138.4	222.7	FM 1787 west – Pleasant Farms	
Midland		151.6	244.0	FM 1213 north	
Midland	Midland	156.8	252.3	I-20 east / Bus. SH 349 north – Stanton, Midland	South end of I-20 overlap; I-20 exit 136
Midland	Midland	see I-20			
Midland	Midland	166.2	267.5	I-20 west / FM 1788 south – Odessa	North end of I-20 overlap; South end of FM 1788 overlap; I-20 exit 125
Midland	Midland	167.0	268.8	I-20 BL – Odessa, Midland	Interchange
Midland	Midland	167.4	269.4	Loop 40 east – Midland International Airport	
Midland	Midland	167.7	269.9	Loop 40 east – Midland International Airport	
Midland		170.8	274.9	SH 191 – Odessa, Midland	Interchange
Midland		173.0	278.4	FM 1788 north	North end of FM 1788 overlap
Midland		174.6	281.0	SH 158 – Andrews, Midland	Interchange
Martin	Midland	185.5	298.5	Bus. SH 349 south – Midland	
Martin		201.5	324.3	SH 176 – Andrews, Big Spring	Interchange
Dawson	Patricia	220.2	354.4	FM 828 east – Klondike	
Dawson		220.5	354.9	SH 115 west – Andrews	
Dawson		221.6	356.6	FM 829	
Dawson		226.8	365.0	FM 2051 west	
Dawson		230.5	371.0	FM 2052 west	South end of FM 2052 overlap
Dawson		230.6	371.1	FM 2052 east to SH 137 – Lamesa, Stanton	North end of FM 2052 overlap
Dawson		232.6	374.3	US 87 / US 180 – Lubbock, Big Spring, Snyder	Northern terminus
1.000 mi = 1.609 km; 1.000 km = 0.621 mi: Concurrency terminus

== Business routes ==
SH 349 has one business route.

=== Martin-Midland business loop ===
Business State Highway 349-C
- Location: Martin and Midland counties
- Length: 8.758 mi (14.095 km)
- Existed: 2003–present

Business State Highway 349-C (Bus. SH 349-C) is a business loop that runs on the former routing of SH 349 through Midland. The route was designated in 2003 when SH 349 was re-routed around the city.

Junction list

The entire route is in Midland.

County	mi	km	Destinations	Notes
Midland	0.0	0.0	I-20 / SH 158 / SH 349 – Odessa, Big Spring	I-20 exit 136
Midland	1.1	1.8	SH 140 east (West Florida Avenue)	Former Bus. SH 158 east
Midland	1.7	2.7	Wall Street	Former Bus. SH 158 west
Midland	4.9	7.9	Loop 250	Interchange
Martin	8.8	14.2	SH 349 – Lamesa	
1.000 mi = 1.609 km; 1.000 km = 0.621 mi
