= Texas State Highway 158 =

State highway in Texas

State Highway 158
- SH 158 highlighted in red

Route information
- Maintained by TxDOT
- Length: 170.2 mi (Note: The certified mileage given is shorter than the actual mileage as TxDOT considers SH 158 to be discontinuous at rather than concurrent with I-20, US 87 and US 277.) (273.9 km)
- Existed: 1930–present

Major junctions
- West end: SH 302 / FM 181 near Goldsmith
- I-20 in Midland; US 87 in Sterling City; US 277 in Bronte
- East end: US 67 / US 83 in Ballinger

Location
- Country: United States
- State: Texas

Highway system
- Highways in Texas; Interstate; US; State; Former; Toll; Loops; Spurs; FM/RM; Park; Rec
← SH 157	→ SH 159

State Highway 158 (SH 158) is a state highway running from near Goldsmith, Texas eastward to Ballinger, Texas.

== Route description ==
SH 158 begins at an intersection with State Highway 302/Farm to Market Road 181 northwest of Odessa in unincorporated Ector County. The highway runs in a northeast–southwest direction until Philips Plant Road, turning into a more east–west direction. SH 158 enters the town of Goldsmith, intersecting with Farm to Market Road 866. The highway resumes its rural route and has an interchange with U.S. Route 385 north of Odessa. SH 158 turns into a southeast–northwest direction near the Ector–Midland county line. The highway shares a short overlap with State Highway 191 in west Midland. The overlap ends at an interchange with Loop 250, with SH 158 following Loop 250 until Interstate 20. The highway leaves Interstate 20 in southeast Midland, running southeast–northwest through rural Midland County. SH 158 runs through Glasscock County and Garden City before entering Sterling County. SH 158 shares an overlap with U. S. Route 87, with the two highways running through Sterling City together. SH 158 leaves US 87 at the eastern edge of Sterling City, running in a north–south direction before resuming an east–west direction. The highway runs through Coke County, serving the towns of Robert Lee and Bronte and later enters Runnels County. SH 158 ends at an intersection with U.S. Route 67/U.S. Route 83 in the town of Ballinger.

== History ==
SH 158 was designated on March 19, 1930 on a route from Robert Lee to Bronte, replacing SH 70A. SH 158 was extended northeast to Abilene and west to Sterling City on January 20, 1932. SH 158 was extended west to Garden City on April 23, 1932. On July 15, 1935, the section from Robert Lee to Garden City was cancelled (as it was not built yet). On December 21, 1935, a section from Garden City to Midland was added, creating a gap. On February 11, 1937, the western section extended westward to Gardendale, replacing SH 216. On August 1, 1938, the section from Garden City to Sterling City was restored, partially closing the gap. On November 19, 1938, SH 158 was extended west to 7.5 miles northeast of Ector-Winkler County line, its current end. On July 9, 1945, FM 652 was designated from SH 158 to SH 302. On September 26, 1945, FM 652 became part of SH 158.

On February 12, 1948, the section from Bronte to Abilene was transferred to U.S. Route 277. On August 19, 1948, SH 158 was extended southeast to Ballinger, replacing SH 109. On September 26, 1963, SH 158 was extended along old location US 83. Some time between 1958 and 1969, Farm to Market Road 387 was signed, but not designated, as SH 158. The two disconnected portions were finally connected on May 6, 1969 when Farm to Market Road 387, completed in 1959, was officially re-designated as SH 158 (which it was part of in 1935).

== Future ==
On March 15, 2022, a bill was signed by President Joe Biden that added the extension of I-27 north to Raton, New Mexico, and south to Laredo to the Interstate Highway System utilizing the US 87, US 277 and US 83 corridors. A bill introduced in 2023 would explicitly designate the extension as I-27 with two auxiliary routes numbered I-227 and I-327. I-227 is proposed to be routed via SH 158 from Sterling City to Midland and SH 349 from Midland to Lamesa; I-327 would utilize US 287 from Dumas to the Oklahoma state line. On August 1, 2023, the legislation passed through the U.S. Senate with some slight modifications; I-227 was redesignated as I-27W with I-27 between Sterling City and Lamesa redesignated as I-27E and I-327 was redesignated as I-27N.

== Junction list ==
County	Location	mi	km	Destinations	Notes
Ector		0.0	0.0	SH 302 – Kermit, Odessa	South end of FM 181 overlap
Ector		0.1	0.16	FM 181 north – Seminole	North end of FM 181 overlap
Ector	Goldsmith	4.9	7.9	FM 866 south	
Ector		12.0	19.3	FM 1936 – West Odessa	
Ector		15.8	25.4	US 385 – Andrews, Odessa	Interchange
Ector	Gardendale	19.0	30.6	FM 554 south – Odessa	
Midland		25.5	41.0	FM 1788 – Midland International Airport	
Midland		27.9	44.9	SH 349 – Lamesa, Midland International Airport	Interchange
Midland	Midland	32.6	52.5	SH 191 west – Odessa	West end of SH 191 overlap; west end of freeway
Midland	Midland	33.7	54.2	Bus. SH 158 east (Andrews Highway) / Loop 250 north – Midland	East end of SH 191 overlap; west end of Loop 250 overlap
Midland	Midland	34.4	55.4	Thomason Drive, Tradewinds Boulevard	
Midland	Midland	35.5	57.1	I-20 BL – Midland, Odessa, Midland International Airport	
Midland	Midland	37.0	59.5	Frontage Road	Westbound exit and eastbound entrance
Midland	Midland	36.3	58.4	Industrial Avenue	Westbound exit and eastbound entrance
Midland	Midland	36.6	58.9	Interstate 20 Frontage Road	Eastbound exit and westbound entrance
Midland	Midland	37.1	59.7	I-20 west / SH 349 north – El Paso, Midland International Airport	East end of Loop 250 overlap; west end of I-20/SH 349 overlap; I-20 exit 131
Midland	Midland	40.4	65.0	Midkiff Road	I-20 exit 134
Midland	Midland	41.3	66.5	Garfield Street	I-20 exit 135
Midland	Midland	42.4	68.2	SH 349 south / Bus. SH 349 north – Midland, Rankin	East end of SH 349 overlap; I-20 exit 136
Midland	Midland	43.3	69.7	Lamesa Road	I-20 exit 137
Midland	Midland	44.4	71.5	I-20 east / SH 140 west	East end of I-20 overlap; I-20 exit 138
Midland		47.0	75.6	FM 1213 south	
Midland		55.5	89.3	FM 1379 north	West end of FM 1379 overlap
Midland		58.0	93.3	FM 1379 south	East end of FM 1379 overlap
Glasscock		65.2	104.9	SH 137 – Stanton, Big Lake	
Glasscock	Garden City	78.9	127.0	RM 33 – Big Spring, Big Lake	
Sterling		107.5	173.0	US 87 north / SH 163 north – Big Spring, Loraine	Interchange; west end of US 87/SH 163 overlap
Sterling	Sterling City	110.3	177.5	SH 163 south – Barnhart	East end of SH 163 overlap
Sterling	Sterling City	111.2	179.0	US 87 south – San Angelo	East end of US 87 overlap
Coke		133.8	215.3	RM 2059 north – Silver	
Coke		141.0	226.9	RM 2034 west	West end of RM 2034 overlap
Coke		143.7	231.3	RM 2034 east to SH 208 – San Angelo	East end of RM 2034 overlap
Coke	Robert Lee	145.6	234.3	Loop 229 north – Lake E.V. Spence	
Coke	Robert Lee	145.8	234.6	SH 208 – Colorado City, San Angelo	
Coke	Bronte	157.6	253.6	US 277 north – Abilene	West end of US 277 overlap
Coke	Bronte	157.9	254.1	US 277 south	East end of US 277 overlap
Runnels		166.6	268.1	FM 3115 south	
Runnels		169.2	272.3	FM 383 north	
Runnels		175.2	282.0	FM 2111	
Runnels	Ballinger	180.6	290.6	FM 2887 north	
Runnels	Ballinger	181.5	292.1	US 67 / US 83 – Coleman, Abilene, San Angelo, Eden	
1.000 mi = 1.609 km; 1.000 km = 0.621 mi: Concurrency terminus; Incomplete access

== Business routes ==
Business State Highway 158-B
- Location: Midland
- Length: 7.067 mi (11.373 km)
- Existed: 1990–present

SH 158 has one business route.

Business State Highway 158-B (formerly Loop 546) is a business loop that runs on the former routing of SH 158 through Midland. The route was created in 1984 as Loop 546 when SH 158 was rerouted around town on top of Loop 250 and SH 349/I-20. Loop 546 was re-designated as Business SH 158-B on June 21, 1990. On June 30, 2011, the road was rerouted to I-20 Business (replacing SH 58), the former route from Loop 268 to Business SH 349 was returned to Midland and the former route from Business SH 349 to SH 158 was transferred to SH 140.

Bus. SH 158-B begins at an interchange with SH 158/SH 191/Loop 250 in eastern Midland, which also serves as the eastern terminus of SH 191. The highway travels in a slight northeast direction along Andrews Highway through the Wallace Heights and Andrews Park neighborhoods before turning southeast at Golf Course Road in Sunset Acres/Lilly Heights. Bus. SH 158-B continues to run by residential areas before turning in a more southern direction at Illinois Avenue near Midland Memorial Hospital. A couple of blocks later, Andrews Highway becomes South Garfield Street at Loop 268 (Wall Street). The highway runs along South Garfield Street through residential areas before ending at an intersection with I-20 BL (West Front Avenue) near a large industrial area.

Junction list

The entire route is in Midland, Midland County.

mi	km	Destinations	Notes
		SH 158 / SH 191 west / Loop 250	Interchange
		Loop 260 west (West Wall Street)	Access to Midland International Airport
		I-20 BL (West Front Avenue)	
1.000 mi = 1.609 km; 1.000 km = 0.621 mi
