= Business routes of Interstate 20 in Texas =

Business Interstate 20

Route information
- Maintained by TxDOT

Location
- Country: United States
- State: Texas

Highway system
- Interstate Highway System; Main; Auxiliary; Suffixed; Business; Future; Highways in Texas; Interstate; US; State; Former; Toll; Loops; Spurs; FM/RM; Park; Rec

All of the business loops within Texas are maintained by the Texas Department of Transportation (TxDOT). Interstate 20 (I-20) has 15 business loops in the state, all located in western Texas. Along I-20, TxDOT identifies each business route as Business Interstate 20 followed by an alphabetic suffix. Along Texas Interstates, the alphabetic suffixes on business route names ascend eastward and northward. There are gaps in the alphabetic values to allow for future system expansion. The alphabetic naming suffixes are included as small letters on the bottom of route shields.

I-20 business routes in Texas generally follow the path of the former U.S. Route 80 (US 80) through the central portions of towns now bypassed by the Interstate route.

== Pecos–Barstow business loop ==
Business Interstate 20-B
- Location: Pecos–Barstow
- Length: 14.042 mi (22.598 km)
- Existed: 1991–present

Business Interstate 20-B (Bus. I-20-B) is a business loop of I-20 that passes through Pecos and Barstow in Reeves and Ward counties. The 13.3-mile (21.4 km) route, commissioned in 1991, begins at I-20 exit 37 and ends at exit 52. In Pecos, the route runs along Third Street. The route has major intersections with US 285, State Highway 17 (SH 17), and three Farm to Market Roads.

The route was originally designated as part of US 80 until US 80 was decommissioned in western Texas in 1991.

County	Location	mi	km	Destinations	Notes
Reeves		0	0.0	I-20 – El Paso	Western terminus
Reeves		0.4	0.64	FM 2119 (Western Ave.)	
Reeves	Pecos	2.2	3.5	SH 17 (Bickley Ave.) – Balmorhea	
Reeves	Pecos	3.0	4.8	FM 761 (Eddy St.)	
Reeves	Pecos	3.6	5.8	US 285 (Cedar St.) – Fort Stockton, Carlsbad, NM	
Ward	Barstow	10.0	16.1	FM 516 (Mackey Ave.)	
Ward		13.3	21.4	I-20 – Monahans	Eastern terminus
1.000 mi = 1.609 km; 1.000 km = 0.621 mi

== Monahans business loop ==
Business Interstate 20-D
- Location: Monahans
- Length: 8.223 mi (13.234 km)
- Existed: 1991–present

Business Interstate 20-D (Bus. I-20-D) is a business loop of I-20 that passes through Monahans in Ward County commissioned in 1991. The 7.2-mile (11.6 km) route begins at I-20 exit 76 and runs along Sealy Avenue, returning to the Interstate at exit 83. The route has major intersections with SH 18, State Highway Spur 57 (Spur 57), and State Highway Loop 464 (Loop 464).

The route, together with Spur 57, was originally designated as part of US 80 until US 80 was decommissioned in western Texas in 1991.

The entire route is in Ward County.

Location	mi	km	Destinations	Notes
	0	0.0	I-20 – Pecos	Western terminus
Monahans	0.6	0.97	Spur 57 (Sealy Ave.) – Wickett, Pyote	
Monahans	2.7	4.3	Loop 464 (Loop Rd.)	
Monahans	4.2	6.8	SH 18 (Main Ave.) – Fort Stockton, Kermit	
Monahans	7.2	11.6	I-20 – Odessa	Eastern terminus
1.000 mi = 1.609 km; 1.000 km = 0.621 mi

== Odessa–Midland business loop ==
Business Interstate 20-E
- Location: Odessa–Midland
- Length: 31.761 mi (51.114 km)
- Existed: 1991–present

Business Interstate 20-E (Bus. I-20-E) is a business loop of I-20 that passes through Odessa and Midland in Ector and Midland counties. The 32.0-mile (51.5 km) loop, commissioned in 1991, begins at I-20 exit 112 in West Odessa and ends at I-20 exit 144 east of Midland. In West Odessa and Odessa, the route is known as Second Street and intersects SH 302 and US 385. Between Odessa and Midland, the route intersects SH 349 connecting the business loop to Midland International Airport. In Midland, the route begins as Wall Street and intersects SH 158. At Spur 268, the business loop turns onto Front Street and continues along that street to its terminus.

The business loop follows the previous path of US 80 through Odessa and Midland between 1952 and 1991 when US 80 was decommissioned in western Texas. Before 1952, US 80 in Midland continued along Wall Street following the present Spur 268, Business State Highway 158-B (Bus. SH 158-B), and Spur 269 until returning to the present route. Between 1952 and 1991, this previous alignment in central Midland was signed as a US 80 business route although it carried state loop and spur designations.

County	Location	mi	km	Destinations	Notes
Ector	West Odessa	0	0.0	I-20 to FM 1936	Western terminus; I-20 exit 112
Ector	West Odessa	1.4	2.3	SH 302 / Loop 338 to I-20 east / US 385	Interchange
Ector	Odessa	2.9	4.7	FM 1882 (County Road West) to I-20	
Ector	Odessa	4.3	6.9	US 385 (Grant Avenue)	
Ector	Odessa	8.2	13.2	Loop 338 to I-20	Interchange
Midland	Odessa	10.6	17.1	Spur 588 (Faudree Road)	
Midland		14.5	23.3	SH 349 / FM 1788	Interchange; no direct eastbound access
Midland		15.1	24.3	Midland Intl Air & Space Port	Interchange
Midland	Midland	19.8	31.9	SH 158 / Loop 250 to I-20	Interchange
Midland	Midland	22.0	35.4	Loop 268 east (Wall Street)	Access to Midland Memorial Hospital
Midland	Midland	23.2	37.3	Bus. SH 158 west (Garfield Street)	
Midland	Midland	24.3	39.1	Bus. SH 349	
Midland	Midland	24.8	39.9	Wall Street	Former Spur 269
Midland		30.1	48.4	Loop 250 to I-20 west	Interchange
Midland		32.0	51.5	I-20	Eastern terminus; I-20 exit 144
1.000 mi = 1.609 km; 1.000 km = 0.621 mi

== Stanton business loop ==
Business Interstate 20-F
- Location: Stanton
- Length: 4.687 mi (7.543 km)
- Existed: 1995–present

Business Interstate 20-F (Bus. I-20-F) is a business loop of I-20 that passes through Stanton in Martin County commissioned in 1995. The 4.6-mile (7.4 km) route begins at I-20 exit 154 and runs along Front Street through Stanton to its terminus at I-20 exit 158. The route has one major intersection with SH 137.

When this section of US 80 was decommissioned on August 28, 1991, this section was designated as State Highway Loop 214 (Loop 214). This designation was replaced by the current Interstate business route designation on March 30, 1995. The number was previously used for State Highway Spur 214 (Spur 214), designated on October 18, 1948, from SH 73 to SH 87. On January 7, 1987, this became part of SH 82.

The entire route is in Martin County.

Location	mi	km	Destinations	Notes
	0	0.0	I-20 – Midland	Western terminus
Stanton	2.0	3.2	SH 137 (Lamesa Hwy.) – Big Lake, Lamesa	
	4.6	7.4	I-20 – Big Spring	Eastern terminus
1.000 mi = 1.609 km; 1.000 km = 0.621 mi

== Big Spring business loop ==
Business Interstate 20-G
- Location: Big Spring
- Length: 5.609 mi (9.027 km)
- Existed: 1990–present

Business Interstate 20-G (Bus. I-20-G) is a business loop of I-20 that passes through Big Spring in Howard County commissioned in 1990. The 5.6-mile (9.0 km) route begins at I-20 exit 174 and runs along Martin Luther King Jr. Boulevard before veering to the northeast and joining Third Street (westbound) and Fourth Street (eastbound) the remaining distance through town. The two streets merge just before rejoining I-20 at exit 179. The route has major intersections with US 87, SH 350, and Farm to Market Road 700 (FM 700).

The business loop largely follows the former route of US 80 through Big Spring before December 18, 1964, when US 80 was rerouted around town over I-20. At that time, the former route through town was designated as Loop 402, although it was signed as a US 80 business route until the current Interstate business route was established on June 21, 1990.

The entire route is in Howard County.

Location	mi	km	Destinations	Notes
	0	0.0	I-20 – Midland, Colorado City	Western terminus; I-20 exit 174
Big Spring	1.5	2.4	FM 700 east	
Big Spring	3.4	5.5	Bus. US 87 (Gregg Street) – Lamesa, Sterling City	
Big Spring	4.0	6.4	SH 350 north (Owens Street)	
Big Spring	5.4	8.7	I-20 – El Paso, Ft. Worth	Eastern terminus; I-20 exit 179
1.000 mi = 1.609 km; 1.000 km = 0.621 mi

== Westbrook business loop ==
Business Interstate 20-H
- Location: Westbrook
- Length: 1.069 mi (1.720 km)
- Existed: 1990–present

Business Interstate 20-H (Bus. I-20-H) is a business loop of I-20 that passes through Westbrook in Mitchell County commissioned in 1990. The 1.1-mile (1.8 km) route begins at I-20 exit 206 and joins FM 670 along Thorne Street to Main Street, where FM 670 turns north. The business loop continues along Thorne St. to I-20 at exit 207.

The business loop follows the route of the former US 80 through Westbrook before US 80 was rerouted along the present Interstate bypass on February 27, 1958. At that time, the former route through town became State Highway Loop 333 (Loop 333) until the present Interstate business route designation began on June 21, 1990.

The entire route is in Mitchell County.

Location	mi	km	Destinations	Notes
	0	0.0	I-20 / FM 670 south – Big Spring	Western terminus; begin overlay of FM 670
Westbrook	0.6	0.97	FM 670 north (Main St.)	End overlay of FM 670
Westbrook	1.1	1.8	I-20 – Colorado City	Eastern terminus
1.000 mi = 1.609 km; 1.000 km = 0.621 mi

== Colorado City business loop ==
Business Interstate 20-J
- Location: Colorado City
- Length: 5.926 mi (9.537 km)
- Existed: 1990–present

Business Interstate 20-J (Bus. I-20-J) is a business loop of I-20 that passes through Colorado City in Mitchell County commissioned in 1990. The 5.9-mile (9.5 km) route begins at I-20 exit 213 and runs along Second Street through Colorado City, ending at I-20 exit 219B. The route has major intersections with SH 163, SH 208, FM 1983, and runs concurrently for several blocks with Bus. SH 208-B on Colorado City's east side.

The business loop follows the route of the former US 80 through Colorado City before January 14, 1963, when US 80 was rerouted along the present Interstate bypass. At that time, the former route through town was designated as State Highway Loop 377 (Loop 377), although it was signed as a US 80 business route. It retained the Loop 377 designation until June 21, 1990, when it was reclassified with its present Interstate business route designation. The number will be reused on March 26, 2020, for Spur 377 in Williamson County.

The entire route is in Mitchell County.

Location	mi	km	Destinations	Notes
	0	0.0	I-20 – Big Spring	Western terminus
Colorado City	1.8	2.9	FM 1983	
Colorado City	2.9	4.7	SH 163 (Chestnut St.) – Sterling City	
Colorado City	3.0	4.8	Bus. SH 208 (Hickory Street)	
Colorado City	4.4	7.1	SH 208 – Robert Lee, Snyder	
	5.9	9.5	I-20 – Sweetwater	Eastern terminus
1.000 mi = 1.609 km; 1.000 km = 0.621 mi

== Loraine business loop ==
Business Interstate 20-K
- Location: Loraine
- Length: 1.633 mi (2.628 km)
- Existed: 1990–present

Business Interstate 20-K (Bus. I-20-K) is a business loop of I-20 that passes through Loraine in Mitchell County commissioned in 1990. The 1.6-mile (2.6 km) route begins at exit 224 of I-20 and follows Pacific Avenue through town to I-20 exit 226B. The route has a major intersection with FM 644.

The business loop follows along the route of the former US 80 through Loraine until February 26, 1957, when US 80 was rerouted along the present Interstate bypass. At that time, the former route was commissioned as State Highway Loop 316 (Loop 316) until June 21, 1990, when the route was given its present Interstate business route designation. The number, however, was reused on December 17, 2009, for Spur 316 in Pottsboro.

The entire route is in Mitchell County.

Location	mi	km	Destinations	Notes
	0	0.0	I-20 – Colorado City	Western terminus
Loraine	1.1	1.8	FM 644 north (Taylor Street) / FM 644 south (Main Street) – SH 208	
Loraine	1.6	2.6	I-20 – Sweetwater	Eastern terminus
1.000 mi = 1.609 km; 1.000 km = 0.621 mi

== Roscoe business spur ==
Business Interstate 20-L
- Location: Roscoe
- Length: 1.644 mi (2.646 km)
- Existed: 1990–present

Business Interstate 20-L (Bus. I-20-L) is a business spur of I-20 that serves Roscoe in Nolan County commissioned in 1990. The 1.6-mile (2.6 km) route begins at I-20 exit 235 and proceeds to the northeast before turning east along First Street in Roscoe. The route terminates at Business U.S. Route 84-J (Bus. US 84-J) and FM 608.

The business spur follows the path of the former US 80 through Roscoe before 1958 when US 80 was rerouted over the present Interstate bypass. The former US 80 continued from the present eastern terminus of the business spur east along First St. then followed US 84 to the present I-20. On December 19, 1958, the present business spur was designated State Highway Spur 237 (Spur 237) and then as State Highway Loop 237 (Loop 237) on April 15, 1959, even while maintaining the current termini as a true spur. The Loop 237 designation was dropped in favor of the current Interstate business classification on June 21, 1990. Loop 237 was originally designated on September 28, 1950, from US 82 south along Robison Road to US 67 in Texarkana. This route was removed from the state highway system on September 23, 1953.

The entire route is in Nolan County.

Location	mi	km	Destinations	Notes
	0	0.0	I-20 – Colorado City	Western terminus
Roscoe	1.6	2.6	Bus. US 84 (First Street / Cypress Street) / FM 608 – Maryneal	Eastern terminus
1.000 mi = 1.609 km; 1.000 km = 0.621 mi

== Sweetwater business loop ==
Business Interstate 20-M
- Location: Sweetwater
- Length: 6.448 mi (10.377 km)
- Existed: 1990–present

Business Interstate 20-M (Bus. I-20-M) is a business loop of I-20 that passes through Sweetwater in Nolan County commissioned in 1990. The 6.1-mile (9.8 km) route begins at exit 241 of I-20 and US 84. The route proceeds to the northeast and at Loop 170 the route turns east along Broadway Street through town. On the east side of Sweetwater, the business loop joins SH 70 and follows that route back to I-20 and US 84 at exit 247. The route has major intersections with FM 419 and FM 1544 and runs concurrently with Bus. SH 70-G on Sweetwater's east side.

The business loop follows the former path of US 80 through Sweetwater before August 4, 1966, when US 80 was relocated along the current Interstate bypass. At that time, the former US 80 through Sweetwater was designated as State Highway Loop 432 (Loop 432), although it was signed as a US 80 business route. That designation ended with the current Interstate business route classification on June 21, 1990.

The entire route is in Nolan County.

Location	mi	km	Destinations	Notes
	0	0.0	I-20 / US 84 – Colorado City, Roscoe	Western terminus
	0.4	0.64	Loop 170	
	1.5	2.4	FM 1544	
Sweetwater	3.4	5.5	Bus. SH 70 south (Locust Street)	Begin concurrency with Bus. SH 70-G
Sweetwater	3.5	5.6	FM 419 (Elm St.) – Roby	
Sweetwater	4.0	6.4	Bus. SH 70 north (Hailey Street)	End concurrency with Bus. SH 70-G
Sweetwater	6.0	9.7	SH 70 north – Roby	Begin concurrency with SH 70
Sweetwater	6.1	9.8	I-20 / US 84 / SH 70 south – Blackwell, Abilene	Eastern terminus; end concurrency with SH 70
1.000 mi = 1.609 km; 1.000 km = 0.621 mi

== Trent business loop ==
Business Interstate 20-N
- Location: Trent
- Length: 2.076 mi (3.341 km)
- Existed: 1990–present

Business Interstate 20-N (Bus. I-20-N) is a business loop of I-20 that passes through Trent in Taylor County commissioned in 1990. The 2.1-mile (3.4 km) route begins at exit 261 of I-20 and US 84 and passes through Trent along First Street, ending at exit 263 of I-20 and US 84. In Trent, the route has a major intersection with FM 1085.

The route follows the former path of US 80 through Trent before US 80 was rerouted along the current Interstate bypass on April 23, 1957. At that time, the former route of US 80 through town became designated as State Highway Loop 319 (Loop 319) until the current Interstate business route was established on June 21, 1990.

The entire route is in Taylor County.

Location	mi	km	Destinations	Notes
	0	0.0	I-20 / US 84 – Sweetwater	Western terminus
Trent	1.4	2.3	FM 1085 (Main St.) – Sylvester	
	2.1	3.4	I-20 / US 84 – Abilene	Eastern terminus
1.000 mi = 1.609 km; 1.000 km = 0.621 mi

== Merkel business loop ==
Business Interstate 20-P
- Location: Merkel
- Length: 2.786 mi (4.484 km)
- Existed: 1990–present

Business Interstate 20-P (Bus. I-20-P) is a business loop of I-20 that passes through Merkel in Taylor County commissioned in 1990. The 2.8-mile (4.5 km) route begins at exit 267 of I-20 and US 84 and passes through Trent along First Street ending at exit 270 of I-20 and US 84. The route briefly runs concurrently with FM 126 and FM 1235.

The route follows the former US 80 through Merkel before US 80 was rerouted along the present Interstate bypass on October 30, 1958. From that time until the present Interstate business route was established on June 21, 1990, the route was designated as State Highway Loop 39 (Loop 39).

The entire route is in Taylor County.

Location	mi	km	Destinations	Notes
	0	0.0	I-20 / US 84 – Sweetwater	Western terminus
Merkel	1.0	1.6	FM 126 south (Ash St.) – Nolan	Begin overlay of FM 126
Merkel	1.2	1.9	FM 126 north (Kent St.) – Hamlin	End overlay of FM 126
Merkel	1.2	1.9	FM 1235 south (Oak St.) – Buffalo Gap	Begin overlay of FM 1235
	2.8	4.5	I-20 / US 84 / FM 1235 north – Abilene, Stith	Eastern terminus; end overlay of FM 1235
1.000 mi = 1.609 km; 1.000 km = 0.621 mi

== Tye business loop ==
Business Interstate 20-Q
- Location: Tye
- Length: 1.661 mi (2.673 km)
- Existed: 1990–present

Business Interstate 20-Q (Bus. I-20-Q) is a business loop of I-20 that passes through Tye in Taylor County commissioned in 1990. The 1.7-mile (2.7 km) route begins along the south service road of I-20 and US 84, although it is accessed from eastbound traffic by way of FM 707 at exit 277. The route runs along North Street to Spinks Road, which carries the route back to I-20 and US 84 at exit 278.

The North St. portion of the route was the former route of US 80 before US 80 was rerouted over the current I-20 on May 31, 1957. The old route was designated State Highway Loop 320 (Loop 320) until the current Interstate business designation was given on June 21, 1990. Before 1957 the former US 80 continued a short distance along North St. beyond Spinks Rd. parallel to the current I-20 to Bus. I-20-R and US 84. This latter section is a portion of the Bankhead Highway Historic District, listed on the National Register of Historic Places.

The entire route is in Taylor County.

Location	mi	km	Destinations	Notes
Tye	0	0.0	I-20 / US 84 – Sweetwater	Western terminus
Tye	0.5	0.80	FM 707 (Scott St.) – Anson	
Tye	1.7	2.7	I-20 / US 84 – Abilene	Eastern terminus
1.000 mi = 1.609 km; 1.000 km = 0.621 mi

== Abilene business loop ==
Business Interstate 20-R
- Location: Abilene
- Length: 8.466 mi (13.625 km)
- Existed: 1990–present

Business Interstate 20-R (Bus. I-20-R) is a business loop of I-20 that passes through Abilene in Taylor County commissioned in 1990. The 12.4-mile (20.0 km) route begins at exit 279 of I-20 and US 84 and proceeds along with US 84 along South First Street past FM 3438. On Abilene's west side, the route intersects US 83 and US 277 at the Winters Fwy., where US 84 turns off to the south. The route continues east along S. First St. to central Abilene where the route turns north along Bus. US 83-D at Treadaway Boulevard. The route follows Treadaway Blvd. a short distance to North Second St, where the route turns east. The route then proceeds along N. Second St. intersecting Loop 322 at the Jake Roberts Fwy. on the east side of Abilene before returning to I-20 at exit 292A.

The route follows the path of the former US 80 which joins the route in Tye approaching along North St. from Bus. I-20-Q. On September 19, 1961, the former US 80 was relocated along the current I-20 and the former route was designated as State Highway Loop 355 (Loop 355), although it was signed as a US 80 business route. This designation lasted until the current Interstate business designation began on June 21, 1990.

The entire route is in Taylor County.

Location	mi	km	Destinations	Notes
Tye	0.0	0.0	I-20 / US 84 west – Sweetwater	Western terminus; west end US 84 overlap
Abilene	2.5	4.0	FM 3438 (Arnold Boulevard) – Dyess Air Force Base	Interchange
Abilene	3.8	6.1	US 83 / US 84 east / US 277 (Winters Freeway) – Ballinger, Coleman, San Angelo, Anson	West end of US 84 overlap
Abilene	7.3	11.7	Bus. US 83 south (Treadaway Boulevard) – Ballinger	West end of Bus. US 83-D overlap
Abilene	7.4	11.9	Bus. US 83 north (Treadaway Boulevard) – Anson	East end of Bus. US 83-D overlap
Abilene	9.9	15.9	Loop 322 (Jake Roberts Freeway) – Abilene, Airport	
Abilene	12.4	20.0	I-20 – Clyde	Eastern terminus
1.000 mi = 1.609 km; 1.000 km = 0.621 mi: Concurrency terminus

== Baird business loop ==
Business Interstate 20-T
- Location: Baird
- Length: 2.826 mi (4.548 km)
- Existed: 1990–present

Business Interstate 20-T (Bus. I-20-T) is a business loop of I-20 that passes through Baird in Callahan County commissioned in 1990. The 2.8-mile (4.5 km) route begins at I-20 exit 306 west of Baird with Bus. I-20-T extending south of the intersection and FM 2047 following the roadway north of I-20. The route crosses through town along Fourth Street and has major intersections with US 283 and FM 18 before leaving Baird and joining I-20 at exit 308 east of town.

The route follows along the former location of US 80 through Baird before 1966 when US 80 was rerouted over the current route of I-20. At that time, the route's designation was changed to State Highway Loop 425 (Loop 425) until 1990 when the route received its current designation. The number, however, was reused on June 24, 2010, for Spur 425.

The entire route is in Callahan County.

Location	mi	km	Destinations	Notes
	0	0.0	I-20 / FM 2047 – Clyde	Western terminus
Baird	1.5	2.4	FM 18 (Market St.)	
Baird	1.9	3.1	US 283 (Cherry St.)	
	2.8	4.5	I-20 – Putnam	Eastern terminus
1.000 mi = 1.609 km; 1.000 km = 0.621 mi
