= Midland, Texas =

City in Texas, United States

- City
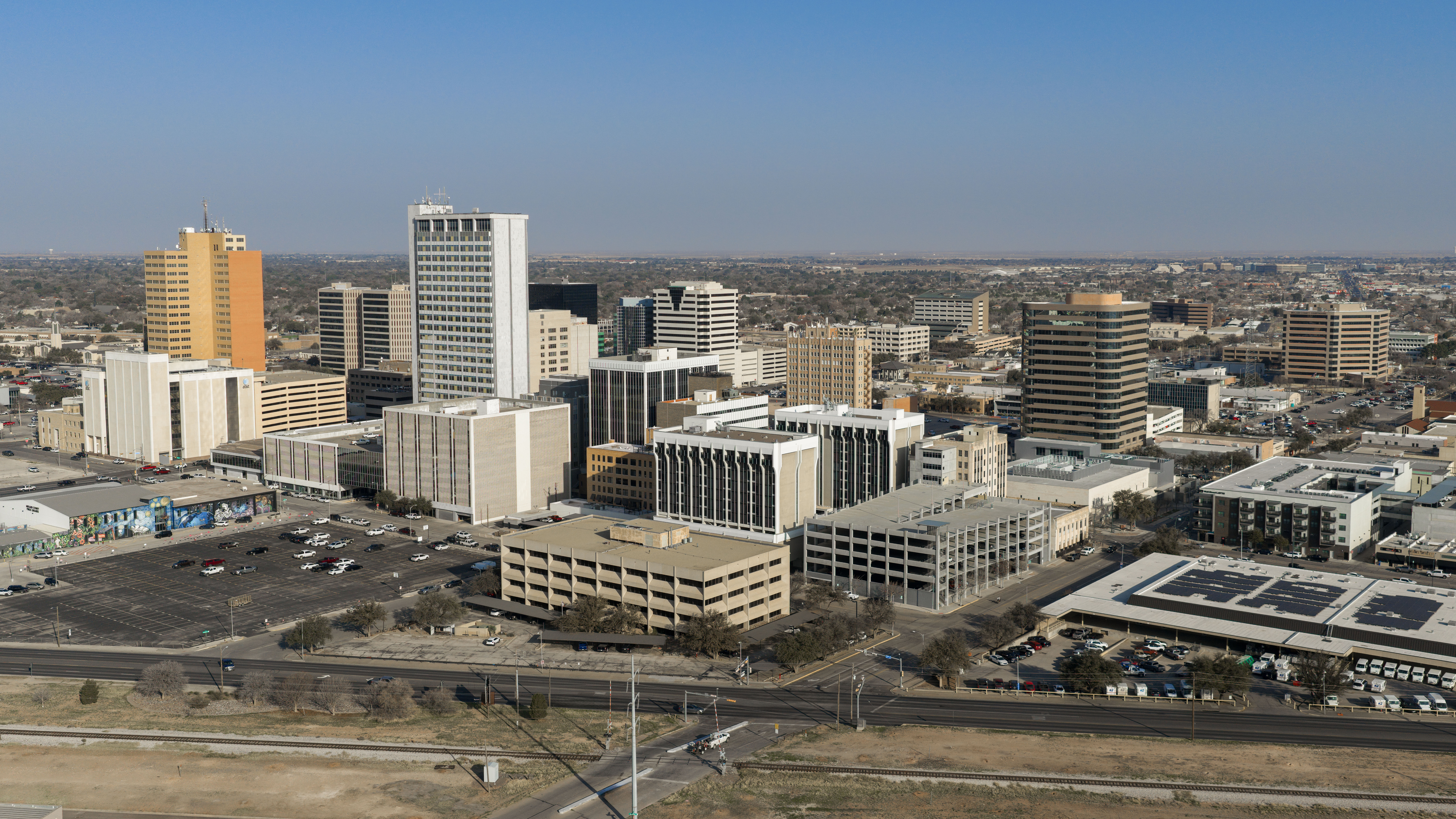
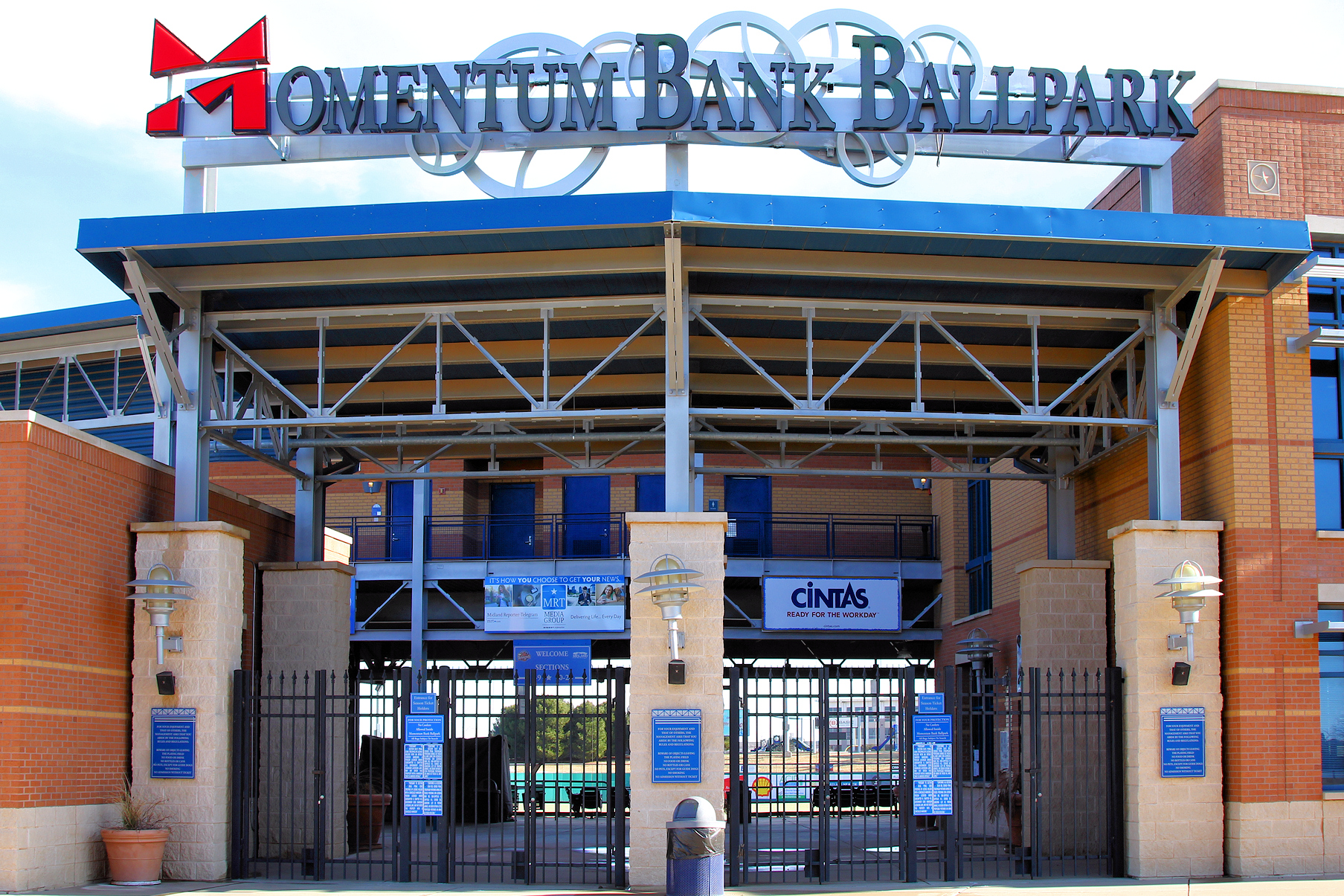
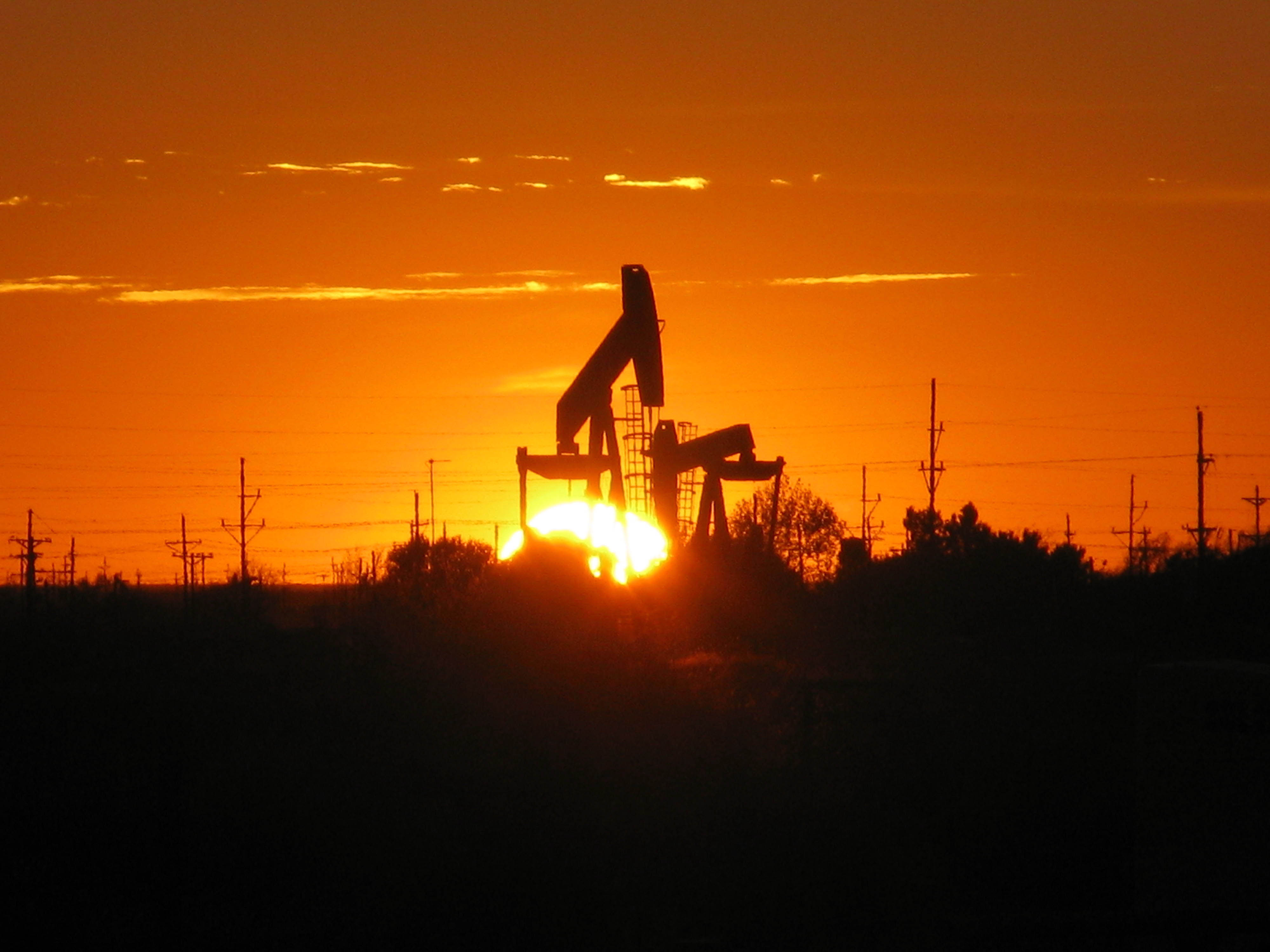
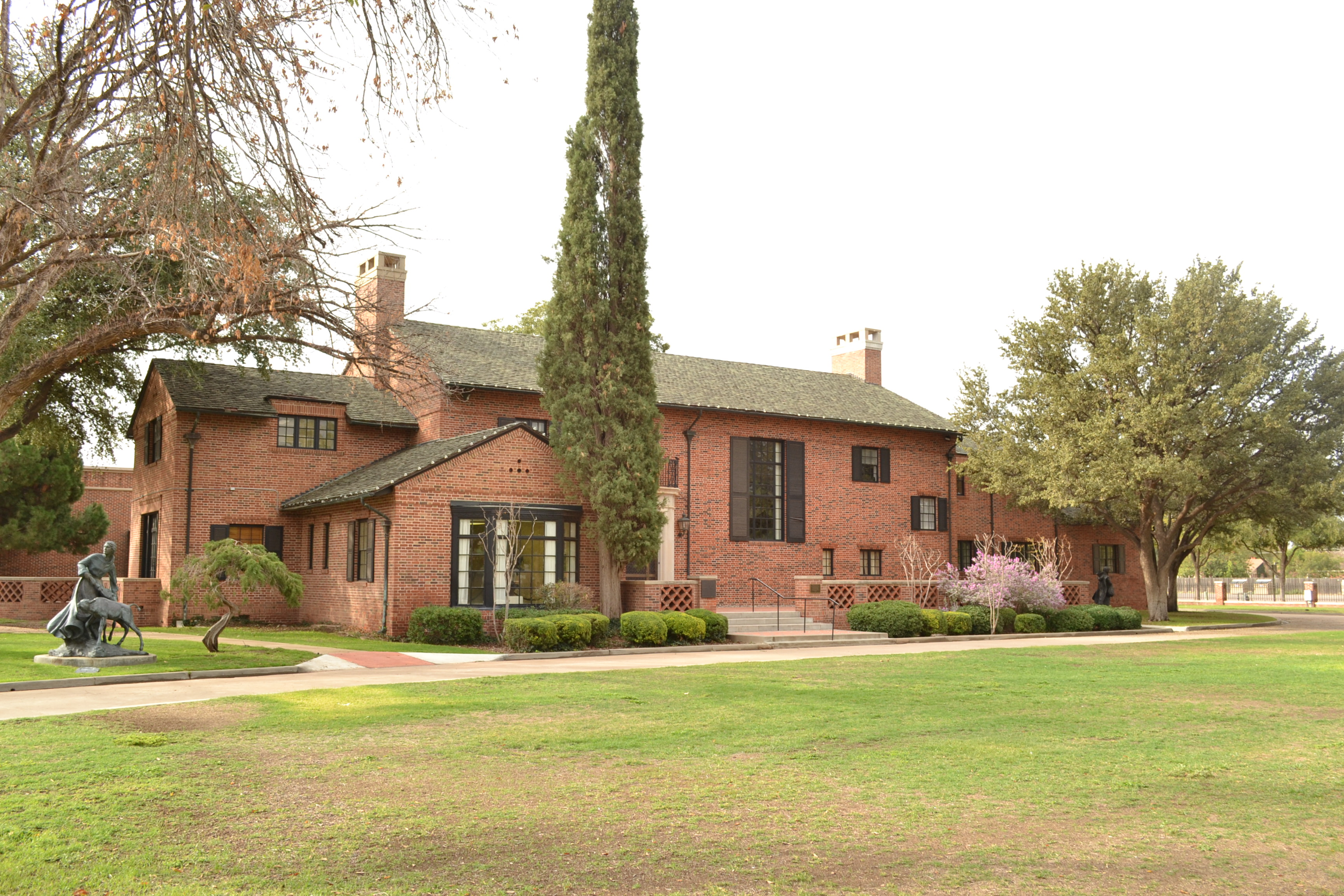
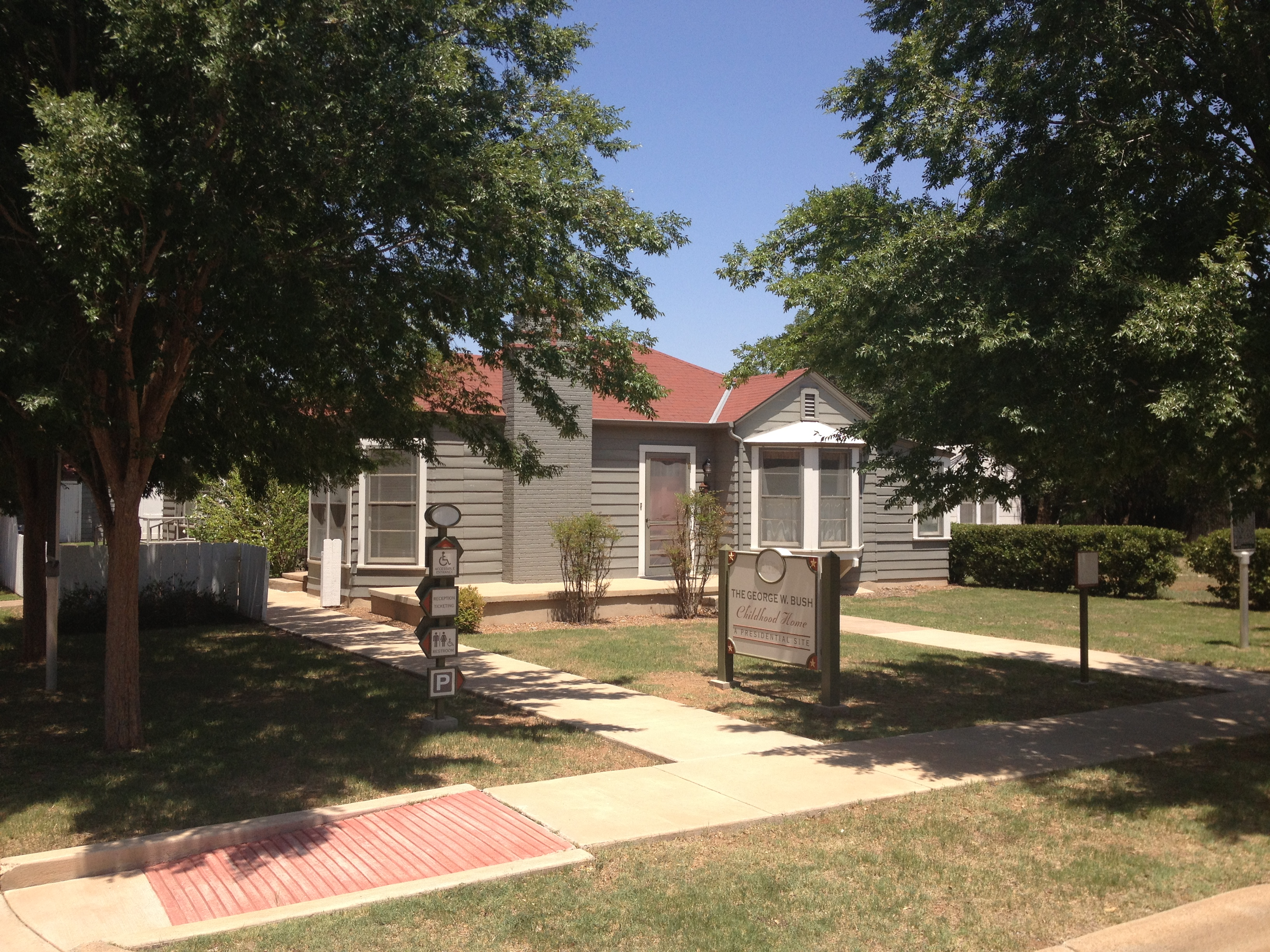
- Downtown Midland Momentum Bank Ballpark Pumpjack in Midland Museum of the Southwest Bush Family Home State Historic Site

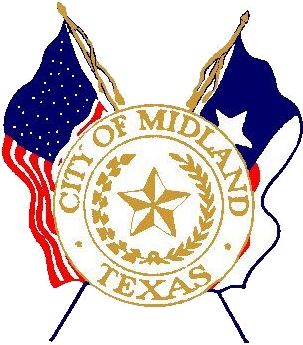
- Flag Seal Logo
- Nickname: The Tall City
- Motto: "Be the Energy!"
- Interactive map of Midland, Texas
- Location within Texas Location within the United States
- Coordinates: 31°59′51″N 102°4′28″W
- Country: United States
- State: Texas
- Counties: Midland, Martin
- Established: 1885

Government
  - Type: Council–manager
  - City Council: Mayor Lori Blong; Amy Stretcher Burkes; Jack Ladd; John Norman; Brian Stubbs
  - City Manager: Tommy Gonzalez
  - At-Large: John Burkholder; Robin Poole

Area
  - City: 75.62 sq mi (195.86 km^{2})
  - Land: 75.45 sq mi (195.41 km^{2})
  - Water: 0.17 sq mi (0.44 km^{2})
- Elevation: 2,782 ft (848 m)

Population (2020)
  - City: 132,524
  - Density: 1,935.6/sq mi (747.33/km^{2})
  - Metro: 169,983
- Time zone: UTC−6 (CST)
  - Summer (DST): UTC−5 (CDT)
- ZIP codes: 79701-12
- Area code: 432
- FIPS code: 48-48072
- GNIS feature ID: 1341547
- Demonym: Midlander
- Website: midlandtexas.gov

Midland is a city in the U.S. state of Texas. It is the county seat of Midland County in West Texas, with small portions extending into Martin County. The population was 132,524 at the 2020 census. Located in the Permian Basin, Midland is a major center for American oil and natural gas production.

The Midland metropolitan area includes all of Midland County and had 169,983 residents at the 2020 census. The metropolitan area is part of the larger Midland–Odessa combined statistical area, which had a population of 340,391 in the 2020 census. Residents of Midland are referred to as "Midlanders".

Midland was founded as the midway point between Fort Worth and El Paso on the Texas and Pacific Railway in 1881. The city has many connections to the Bush family; it was the one-time home of former U.S. presidents George H. W. Bush and George W. Bush, and the hometown of former First Lady Laura Bush. The Bush Family Home State Historic Site is located in Midland.

== History ==
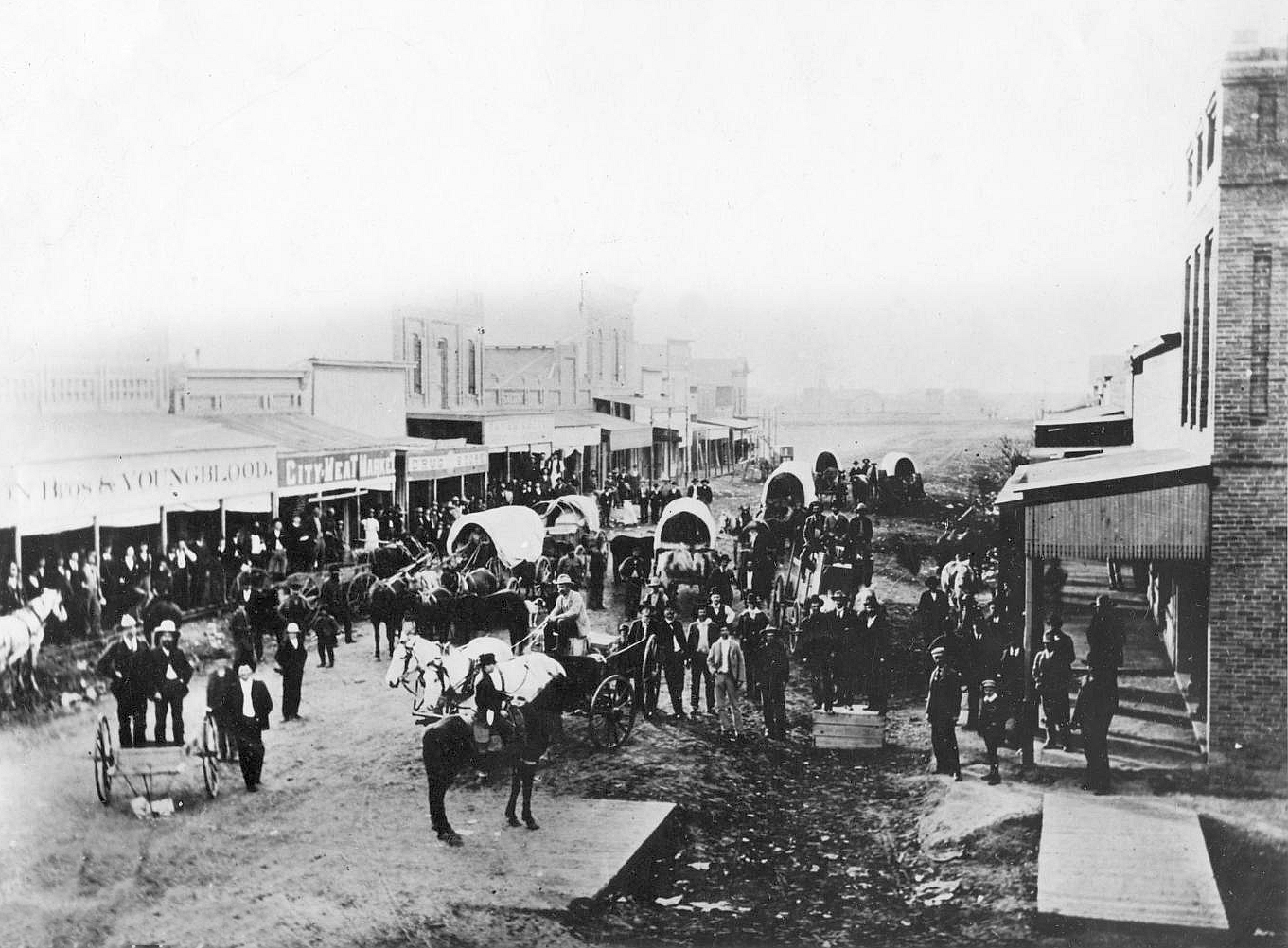
Main Street in 1894

Midland was established in June 1881 as Midway Station, on the Texas and Pacific Railway. Its name came from its central location between Fort Worth and El Paso, but because there were already other towns in Texas named Midway, the city changed its name to Midland in January 1884 when it was granted its first post office.

Midland became the county seat of Midland County in March 1885, when that county was first organized and separated from Tom Green County. By 1890, it had become one of the state's most important cattle shipping centers. The city was incorporated in 1906, and by 1910 established its first fire department, along with a new water system.

Midland was changed significantly by the discovery of oil in the Permian Basin in 1923 when the Santa Rita No. 1 well began producing in Reagan County, followed shortly by the Yates Oil Field in Iraan. Midland became the West Texas oil fields' administrative center. During World War II, it had the nation's largest bombardier training base. A second boom began after the war, with the discovery and development of the Spraberry Trend, still the country's third-largest oil field by total reserves. Yet another boom period took place during the 1970s, with the high oil prices associated with the oil and energy crises. Today, the Permian Basin produces one fifth of the nation's total petroleum and natural gas output.

Midland's economy still relies heavily on petroleum, but the city also became a regional telecommunications and distribution center. By August 2006, a busy period of crude oil production had caused a significant workforce deficit. According to the Midland Chamber of Commerce, at that time there were almost 2,000 more jobs available in the Permian Basin than there were workers to fill them.

In 1959, John Howard Griffin wrote a history of Midland, Land of the High Sky.

=== Avery v. Midland County ===
In 1967, the U.S. Supreme Court heard the case Avery v. Midland County. Midland mayor Hank Avery had sued Midland County, challenging the electoral-districting scheme in effect for elections to the County Commissioner's Court. The county districts geographically quartered the county, but Midland, in the northwestern quarter, had 97% of the county's population. A judge, elected on an at-large basis, provided a fifth vote, but the result was that the three rural commissioners, representing only 3% of the county's population, held a majority of the votes.

The Court held that the scheme violated the Fourteenth Amendment's Equal Protection Clause. A dissenting minority held that this example of the Warren Court's policy of incorporation at the local-government level exceeded its constitutional authority.

== Geography ==
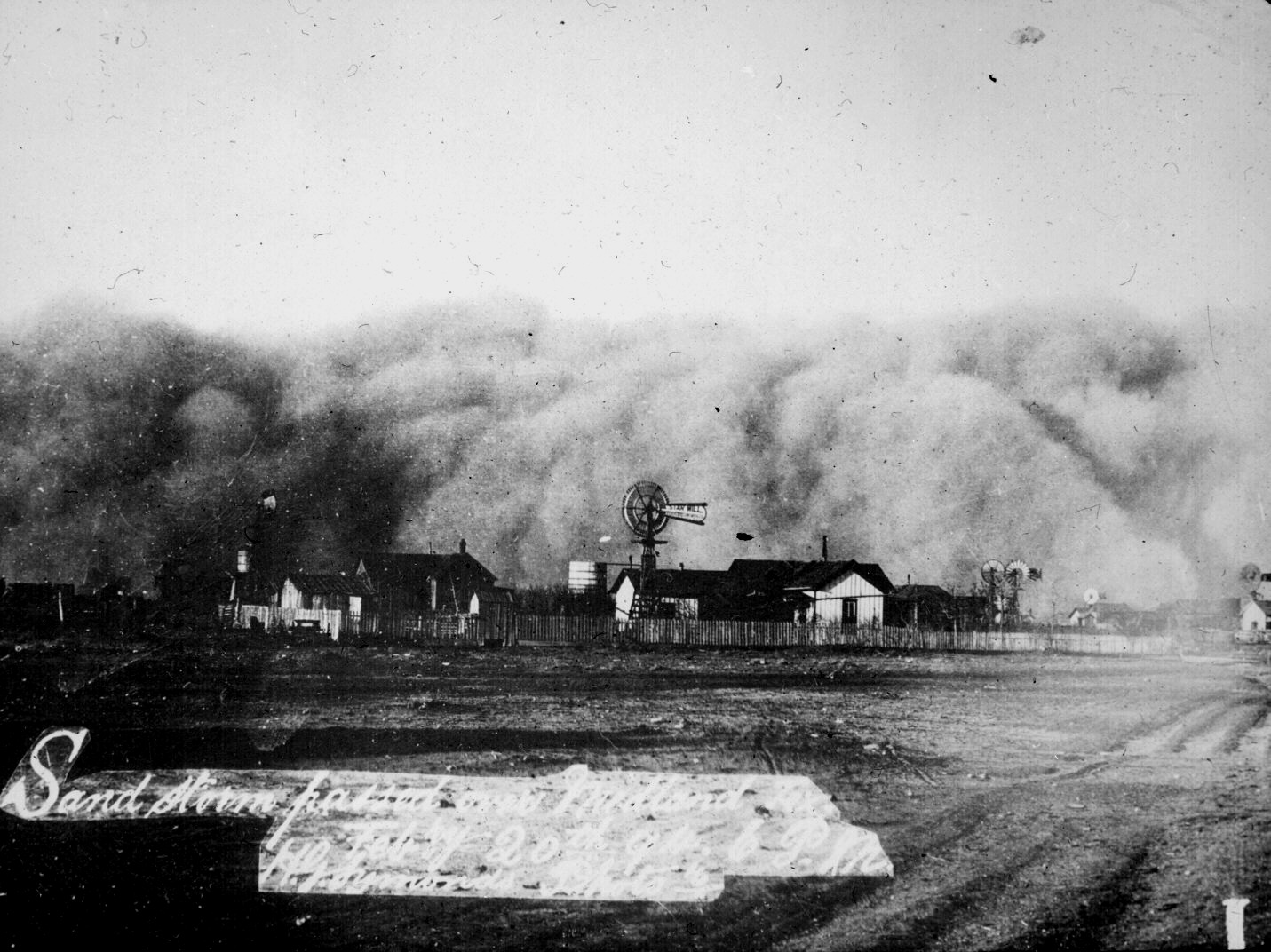
1894 sandstorm

Midland is in the Permian Basin in the West Texas plains.

According to the United States Census Bureau, the city has an area of 71.5 square miles (185.2 km^{2}), of which 71.3 square miles (184.7 km^{2}) is land and 0.2 square mile (0.5 km^{2}) (0.28%) is water.

=== Climate ===
Midland has a hot semi-arid climate (Köppen BSh) bordering upon a hot arid climate (BWh) and a cool semi-arid climate (BSk) with hot to sweltering summers and cool to mild winters. It occasionally has cold waves during the winter, but rarely sees extended periods of below-freezing cold.

Midland receives approximately 13.5 inches (340 mm) of precipitation per year, much of which falls in the summer. Highs exceed 90 °F or 32.2 °C on 115 afternoons per year and 100 °F or 37.8 °C on 24 afternoons while lows fall to 32 °F or 0 °C or below on 58 mornings.

Climate data for Midland International Airport, Texas (1991–2020 normals, (Note: Mean monthly maxima and minima (i.e. the highest and lowest temperature readings during an entire month or year) calculated based on data at said location from 1991 to 2020.) extremes 1930–present)
Month	Jan	Feb	Mar	Apr	May	Jun	Jul	Aug	Sep	Oct	Nov	Dec	Year
Record high °F (°C)	84 (29)	92 (33)	99 (37)	104 (40)	108 (42)	116 (47)	112 (44)	113 (45)	107 (42)	101 (38)	90 (32)	85 (29)	116 (47)
Mean maximum °F (°C)	77.7 (25.4)	81.8 (27.7)	88.7 (31.5)	94.7 (34.8)	101.0 (38.3)	104.9 (40.5)	103.2 (39.6)	102.3 (39.1)	98.4 (36.9)	92.9 (33.8)	83.0 (28.3)	77.3 (25.2)	107 (42)
Mean daily maximum °F (°C)	58.6 (14.8)	63.6 (17.6)	71.9 (22.2)	80.5 (26.9)	88.5 (31.4)	95.0 (35.0)	95.8 (35.4)	94.8 (34.9)	87.6 (30.9)	79.0 (26.1)	67.1 (19.5)	59.2 (15.1)	78.5 (25.8)
Daily mean °F (°C)	45.7 (7.6)	50.2 (10.1)	58.0 (14.4)	66.2 (19.0)	75.4 (24.1)	82.6 (28.1)	84.4 (29.1)	83.2 (28.4)	76.2 (24.6)	66.5 (19.2)	54.3 (12.4)	46.4 (8.0)	65.8 (18.8)
Mean daily minimum °F (°C)	32.7 (0.4)	36.7 (2.6)	44.2 (6.8)	51.8 (11.0)	62.2 (16.8)	70.3 (21.3)	72.9 (22.7)	71.7 (22.1)	64.8 (18.2)	54.0 (12.2)	41.5 (5.3)	33.6 (0.9)	53.0 (11.7)
Mean minimum °F (°C)	18.2 (−7.7)	20.1 (−6.6)	25.3 (−3.7)	33.5 (0.8)	45.8 (7.7)	59.5 (15.3)	65.2 (18.4)	62.9 (17.2)	50.0 (10.0)	34.8 (1.6)	23.7 (−4.6)	18.5 (−7.5)	13.6 (−10.2)
Record low °F (°C)	−8 (−22)	−11 (−24)	9 (−13)	20 (−7)	32 (0)	47 (8)	49 (9)	52 (11)	36 (2)	16 (−9)	10 (−12)	−1 (−18)	−11 (−24)
Average precipitation inches (mm)	0.66 (17)	0.58 (15)	0.68 (17)	0.70 (18)	1.57 (40)	1.80 (46)	1.62 (41)	1.72 (44)	1.66 (42)	1.21 (31)	0.72 (18)	0.59 (15)	13.51 (343)
Average snowfall inches (cm)	1.6 (4.1)	0.7 (1.8)	0.0 (0.0)	0.1 (0.25)	0.0 (0.0)	0.0 (0.0)	0.0 (0.0)	0.0 (0.0)	0.0 (0.0)	0.0 (0.0)	0.5 (1.3)	1.4 (3.6)	4.3 (11.05)
Average precipitation days (≥ 0.01 in)	3.6	3.4	3.6	2.7	5.1	4.5	4.5	5.3	5.5	4.3	3.2	3.6	49.3
Average snowy days (≥ 0.1 in)	1.1	0.7	0.0	0.1	0.0	0.0	0.0	0.0	0.0	0.1	0.3	0.8	3.1
Average relative humidity (%)	56.6	54.7	46.2	44.9	50.6	53.1	51.2	53.7	61.2	59.9	58.7	57.6	54.0
Average dew point °F (°C)	24.3 (−4.3)	27.3 (−2.6)	30.2 (−1.0)	37.0 (2.8)	47.7 (8.7)	57.0 (13.9)	58.8 (14.9)	59.0 (15.0)	56.7 (13.7)	46.8 (8.2)	35.4 (1.9)	26.8 (−2.9)	42.3 (5.7)
Source: National Weather Service / NOAA (relative humidity and dew point 1961–1990)

=== Cityscape ===
Nicknamed "The Tall City", Midland has long been known for its downtown skyline. Most of downtown Midland's major office buildings were built during a time of major Permian Basin oil and gas discoveries. The surge in energy prices in the mid-1980s sparked a building boom downtown. For many years, the 22-story Wilco Building in downtown was the tallest building between Fort Worth and Phoenix. Today, the tallest is the 24-story Bank of America Building, at 332 feet (101 m). Four buildings over 500 feet (150 m) tall were planned in the 1980s, including one designed by architect I.M. Pei.

The great oil bust of the mid-1980s killed any plans for future skyscrapers. A private development group was planning to build Energy Tower at City Center, which was proposed to be 870 feet tall, with 59 floors (six floors underground and 53 above). If it had been built, it would have been Texas's sixth-tallest building.

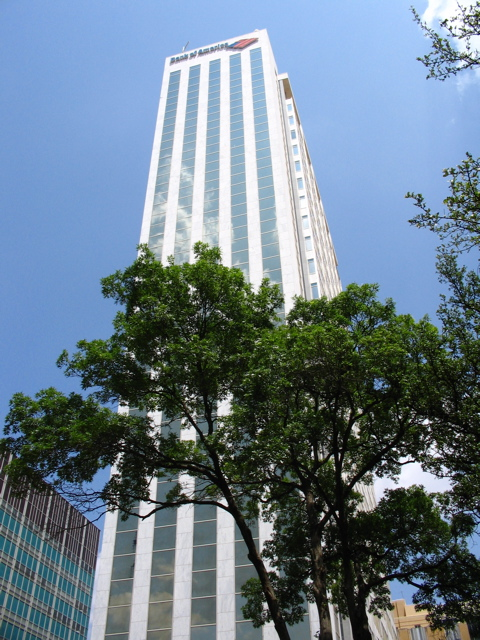
Midland's tallest building, the Bank of America Building

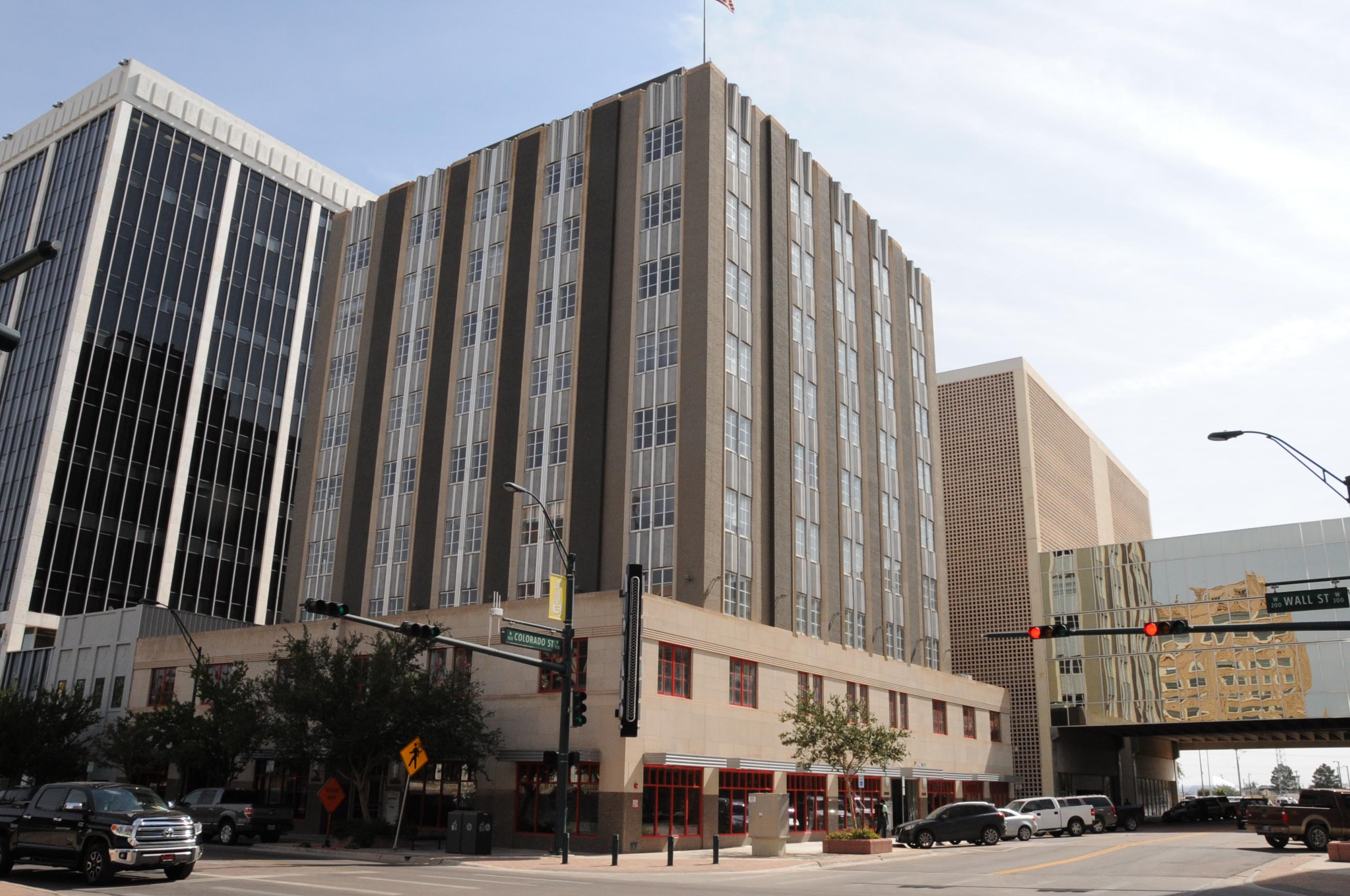
Midland Tower is one of Midland's oldest high rise buildings.

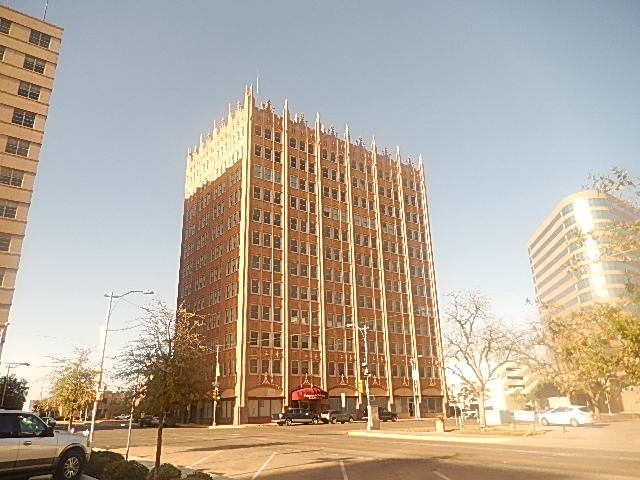
The historic Petroleum Building was built with a neo-gothic facade in 1928.

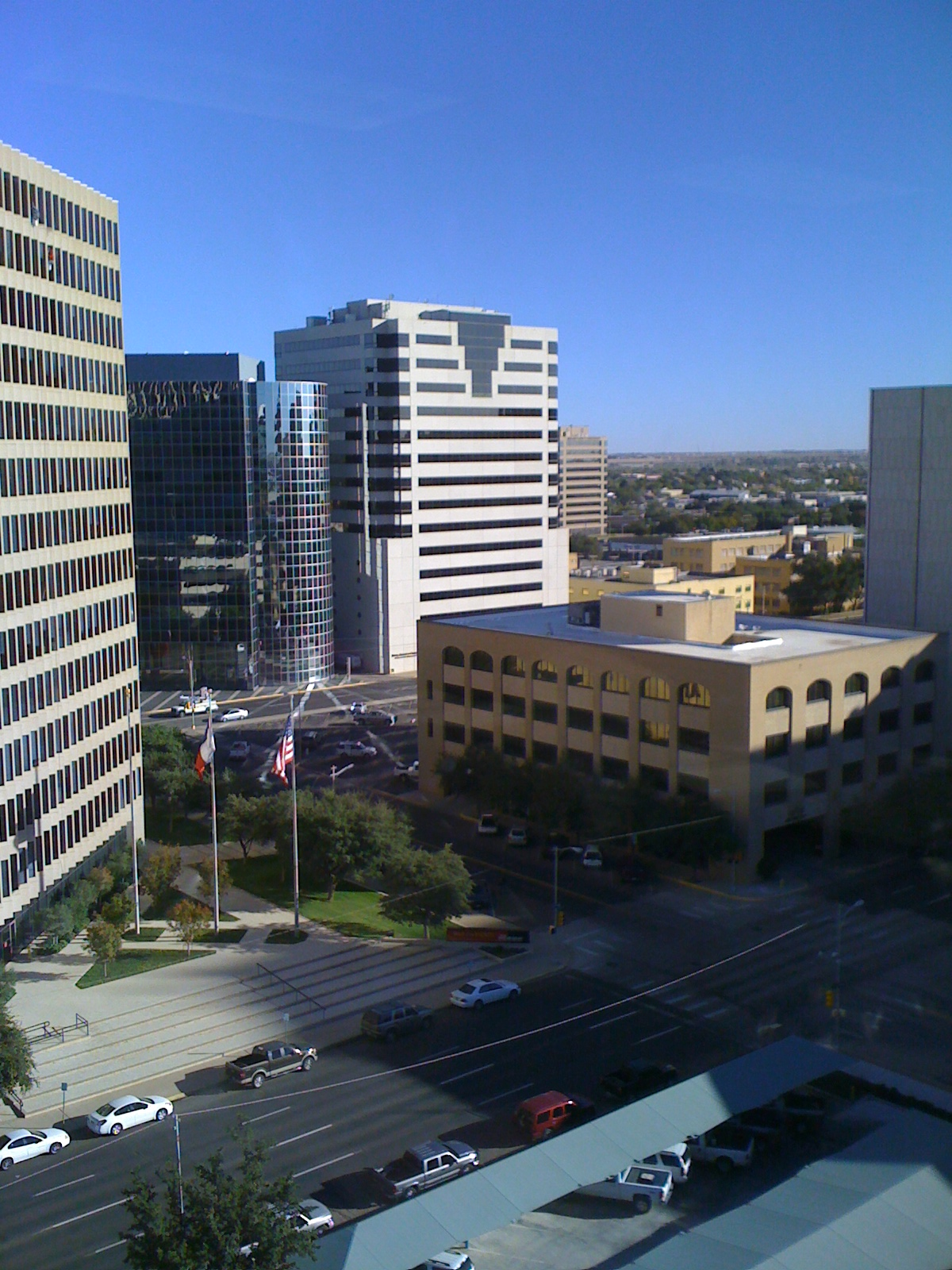
A vew of Independence Plaza and the Summit Building. Independence Plaza is Midland's 4th tallest building.

== Demographics ==
Historical population
Census	Pop.	Note	%±
1910	2,192		—
1920	1,795		−18.1%
1930	5,484		205.5%
1940	9,352		70.5%
1950	21,713		132.2%
1960	62,625		188.4%
1970	59,463		−5.0%
1980	70,525		18.6%
1990	89,443		26.8%
2000	94,996		6.2%
2010	111,147		17.0%
2020	132,524		19.2%
U.S. Census Bureau Texas Almanac

=== Racial and ethnic composition ===
Midland city, Texas – Racial and ethnic composition Note: the US Census treats Hispanic/Latino as an ethnic category. This table excludes Latinos from the racial categories and assigns them to a separate category. Hispanics/Latinos may be of any race.
Race / ethnicity (NH = Non-Hispanic)	Pop 2000	Pop 2010	Pop 2020	% 2000	% 2010	% 2020
White alone (NH)	57,603	57,658	59,453	60.64%	51.88%	44.86%
Black or African American alone (NH)	7,811	8,426	9,913	8.22%	7.58%	7.48%
Native American or Alaska Native alone (NH)	323	421	546	0.34%	0.38%	0.41%
Asian alone (NH)	928	1,474	3,422	0.98%	1.33%	2.58%
Native Hawaiian or Pacific Islander alone (NH)	13	39	127	0.01%	0.04%	0.10%
Other Race alone (NH)	50	200	473	0.05%	0.18%	0.36%
Mixed-race or multiracial (NH)	725	1,132	3,429	0.76%	1.02%	2.59%
Hispanic or Latino (any race)	27,543	41,797	55,161	28.99%	37.61%	41.62%
Total	94,996	111,147	132,524	100.00%	100.00%	100.00%

=== 2020 census ===
As of the 2020 census, there were 132,524 people, 48,227 households, and 32,632 families residing in the city.

The population density was 1,558.9 inhabitants per square mile (601.9/km^{2}). There were 55,424 housing units at an average density of 667.1 per square mile (257.6/km^{2}); 13.0% of the units were vacant, the homeowner vacancy rate was 1.7%, and the rental vacancy rate was 21.3%.

According to the same census, 98.4% of residents lived in urban areas, while 1.6% lived in rural areas.

Racial composition as of the 2020 census
Race	Number	Percent
White	76,288	57.6%
Black or African American	10,446	7.9%
American Indian and Alaska Native	1,175	0.9%
Asian	3,501	2.6%
Native Hawaiian and Other Pacific Islander	163	0.1%
Some other race	16,628	12.5%
Two or more races	24,323	18.4%

Of the 48,227 households, 37.8% had children under the age of 18 living in them, 51.2% were married-couple households, 19.4% were households with a male householder and no spouse or partner present, and 23.3% were households with a female householder and no spouse or partner present. About 29.3% of households were made up of same-sex relationships, non-family habitations, or other habitation arrangements; 24.6% of all households consisted of individuals, and 7.7% had someone living alone who was 65 years of age or older. The average household size was 2.62 and the average family size was 3.19.

In the city, the population was distributed as 27.2% under the age of 18, 9.0% from 18 to 24, 28.2% from 25 to 44, 20.6% from 45 to 64, and 11.1% who were 65 years of age or older. The median age was 33.3 years. For every 100 females, there were 100.9 males, and for every 100 females age 18 and over, there were 99.7 males age 18 and over.

The median household income in 2020 was $90,448, with a per capita income of $47,870. 10.5% of the population was below the poverty line.

=== 2000 census ===
In 2000, the median income for a household in the city was $39,320, and for a family was $48,290. Males had a median income of $37,566 versus $24,794 for females. The per capita income for the city in 2007 was $52,294. In 2000, about 10.1% of families and 12.9% of the population were below the poverty line, including 16.4% of those under age 18 and 8.0% of those age 65 or over.

In 2014, Forbes magazine ranked Midland the second fastest-growing small city in the United States.

== Economy ==
In 2014, Midland had the lowest unemployment rate in the United States, 2.3%. According to the city's latest Comprehensive Annual Financial Report, the city's top ten employers are:

#	Employer	# of employees
1	Midland Independent School District	2,919
2	Midland Memorial Hospital and Medical Center	1,670
3	Dawson Geophysical	1,244
4	Walmart	950
5	City of Midland	880
6	Midland College	735
7	Baker Hughes	600
8	Warren Equipment Companies	597
9	Midland County, Texas	541
10	H-E-B	509

== Arts and culture ==
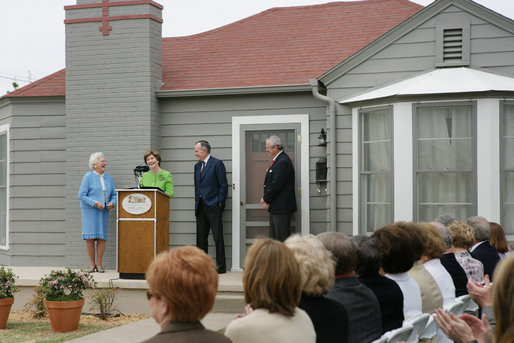
Barbara Bush, Laura Bush, and George H. W. Bush at the dedication of the George W. Bush Childhood Home in 2006

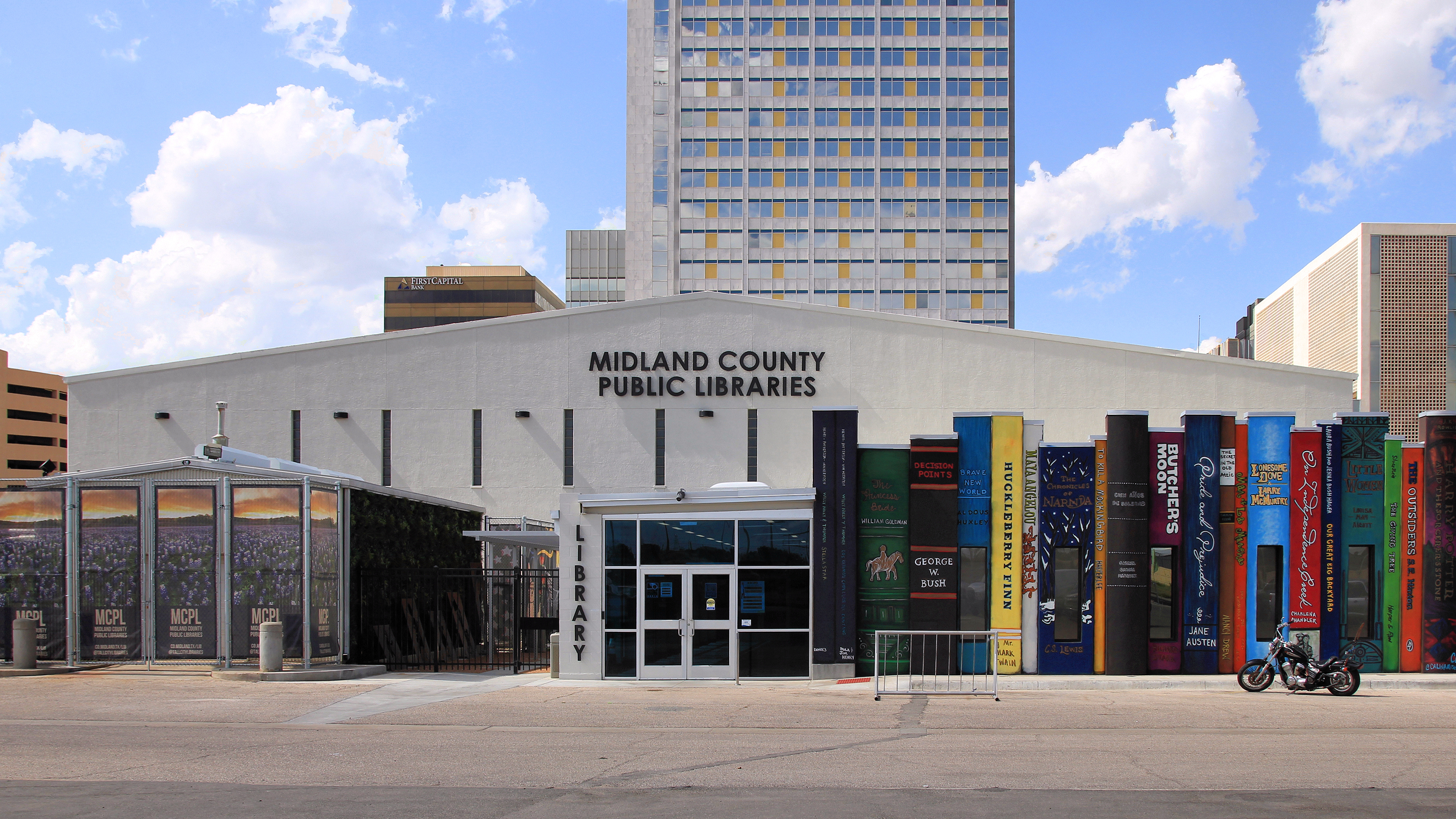
Midland County Public Library

=== Galleries ===
Midland College is home to the McCormick Gallery, inside the Allison Fine Arts Building on the main campus. Throughout the year, exhibits at the McCormick feature works of MC students and faculty, visiting artists, and juried exhibits. The Arts Council of Midland serves as the promotional and public relations vehicle to promote the arts and stimulate community participation and support. The McCormick is also home to the Studio 3600 Series, established in 2006 to "spotlight selected art students and provide them the opportunity to exhibit key works that identify the style they have crafted over a period of time."

=== Performing arts ===
The Midland-Odessa Symphony and Chorale (MOSC) has performed in the Permian Basin for over 45 years, and is the region's largest orchestral organization, presenting both Pops and Masterworks concerts throughout the year. The MOSC also is home to three resident chamber ensembles, the Lone Star Brass, Permian Basin String Quartet and West Texas Winds. These ensembles are made up of principal musicians in the orchestra.

The Midland Community Theatre (MCT) originated in 1946 with musicals, comedies, dramas, mysteries, children's theatre and melodramas. MCT produces 15 shows each year in three performance spaces—Davis Theatre I and Mabee Theatre II, in the Cole Theatre, and the annual fundraiser Summer Mummers in the Yucca Theatre. MCT is a member of the American Association of Community Theatre, and hosted the 2006 AACT International Theatrefest.

Twice each year, the Phyllis and Bob Cowan Performing Arts Series at Midland College presents free cultural and artistic performances. The series was endowed in 1999.

=== Libraries ===
- Midland County Library
- Haley Memorial Library and History Center
- Murray L. Fasken Learning Resource Center at Midland College

=== Tourism ===
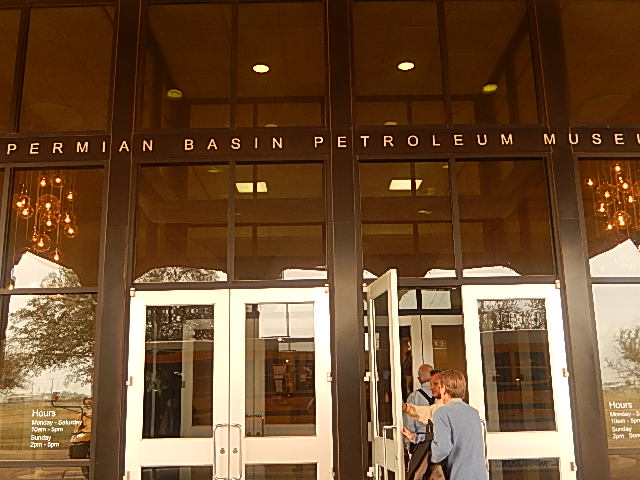
Permian Basin Petroleum Museum

Sitting on the southern edge of the Llano Estacado and near the center of the Permian Basin oil fields, Midland's economy has long been focused on petroleum exploration and extraction. Providing more information about this industry is the Permian Basin Petroleum Museum, on the outskirts of town near Interstate 20. The museum houses numerous displays on the history, science, and technology of oil and gas development. The Permian Basin Petroleum Museum houses a collection of race cars designed by Jim Hall, a longtime Midland resident who pioneered the use of aerodynamic downforce in Formula One car design.

Midland is also home to The Museum of the Southwest. The museum features a collection of paintings by various members of the Taos Society of Artists and Karl Bodmer as well as engravings by John J. and John W. Audubon. Within the same museum complex are the Children's Museum and the Marian W. Blakemore Planetarium. The Museum of the Southwest is in the Turner Mansion, the historic 1934 home of Fred and Juliette Turner.

On display at the Midland County Historical Museum are reproductions of the "Midland Man", the skeleton of a Clovis female found near the city in 1953. Analysis of the remains by Curtis R. McKinney using uranium-thorium analysis showed that the bones are 11,600 ± 800 years old. Presenting his findings at the annual meeting of the Geological Society of America in 1992, McKinney said, "[T]he Midland Woman was related to the earliest ancestors of every Indian who lives today, and she is very likely the only representative of those who created the Clovis cultures."

== Sports ==
Midland is home to the Midland RockHounds, a Texas League minor league baseball team. It is the AA affiliate of the Athletics. The Rockhounds have played their home games in Momentum Bank Ballpark since 2002.

West Texas FC is an American soccer team founded in 2008. The team is a member of USL League Two, the fourth tier of the American Soccer Pyramid, in the Ranger Division of the Southern Conference. The team plays its home games at Astound Broadband Stadium.

Midland is home to the West Texas Drillers (adult tackle football) of the Minor Professional Football League. They were established in 2009. They play their home games at Grande Communications Stadium.

Midland College is a member of the Western Junior College Athletic Conference, and fields teams in baseball, men's basketball, women's basketball, men's golf, softball and volleyball. Midland College has won 20 national championships in sports since 1975, as well as produced 192 All-Americans.

Plans have been made to develop a 35-court tennis facility named the Bush Tennis Center.

Midland is also home to the Midland Mad Dog Rugby Club, which competes in the Texas Rugby Union as a Division III team.

Midland brought arena football to the city with the Midland Frac-Attack of American Indoor Football that play at the Midland County Horseshoe starting in 2026.

== Government ==
=== Local government ===
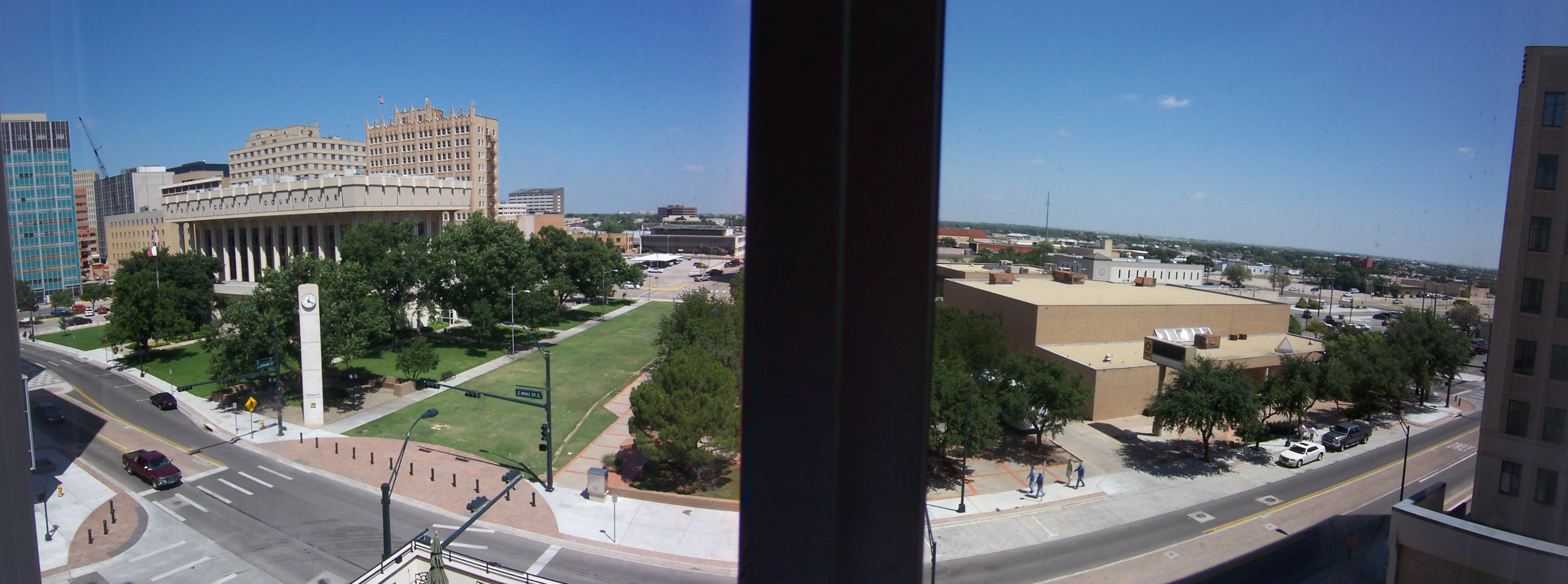
The former Midland County Courthouse on Wall Street, looking north from Midland Doubletree towers

According to its 2008 Comprehensive Annual Financial Report, Midland's various funds had $57.3 million in revenues, $53.0 million in expenditures, $363.4 million in total assets, $133.9 million in total liabilities, and $75.0 million in cash and investments.

List of mayors of Midland, Texas
- 1907–1908, S.J. Issaacs
- 1908–1909, A.C. Parker
- 1909–1911, J.A. Haley
- 1911–1915, J.M. Cladwell
- 1915–1917, J.M. Gilmore
- 1917–1918, H.A. Leaverton
- 1918–1923, W.A. Dawson
- 1923–1925, Paul T. Barron
- 1925–1929, Frank Haag
- 1929–1934, Leon Goodman
- 1934–1943, M.C. Ulmer
- 1943–1946, A.N. Hendrickson
- 1946–1947, Fred Hogan
- 1947–1949, Russell H. Gifford
- 1949–1951, William B. Neely
- 1951–1953, Perry Pickett
- 1953–1954, J.W. McMillen
- 1955–1958, Ernest Sidwell
- 1958–1962, F.L. Thompson
- 1962–1968, H. C. Avery Jr.
- 1968–1972, Edwin H. Magruder Jr.
- 1972–1980, Ernest Angelo Jr.
- 1980–1986, G. Thane Akins
- 1986–1992, Carroll Thomas
- 1992–1994, J.D. Faircloth
- 1994–2001, Robt. E. Burns
- 2001–2008, Michael J. Canon
- 2008–2014, Wes Perry
- 2014–2019, Jerry Morales
- 2019-2023, Patrick Payton
- 2023–present, Lori Blong

=== State and federal representation ===
Midland is represented in the US Senate by John Cornyn and Ted Cruz and in the US House of Representatives by August Pfluger. Midland residents are represented in the Texas Senate by Republican Kevin Sparks, District 31. Midland has been represented in the Texas House of Representatives by Republican Tom Craddick, the former Speaker from District 82, since 1969. Craddick is the longest serving representative in the history of the Texas House and the longest serving incumbent state legislator in the United States.

== Education ==
=== Colleges and universities ===
Midland is the home of Midland College (MC), which offers over 50 programs of study for associate degrees and certificates to more than 7,200 students who enroll each semester. MC offers programs in health sciences, information technology, and aviation, including a professional pilot training program. MC is one of only three community colleges in Texas approved to offer a bachelor's degree in applied technology. Dr. Damon Kennedy is MC's president.

Midland is home to the Texas Tech University Health Sciences Center Permian Basin Campus's physician assistant program, on the MC campus. The entry-level graduate program awards a Master of Physician Assistant Studies following 27 months of intensive academic and clinical training.

All of Midland County except for the Greenwood community is in the service area of Midland College. All of Martin County is in the service area of Howard County Junior College District.

=== Primary and secondary schools ===
Midland Independent School District serves the portion in Midland County, as in the vast majority of Midland. Midland is home to three public high schools: Midland High School, Legacy High School and Early College High School (ECHS) at Midland College, all of which are part of MISD. Another school district just outside Midland, Greenwood Independent School District, serves approximately 3,000 students and operates Greenwood High School, James R. Brooks Middle School, Greenwood Intermediate, and Greenwood Elementary.

In July 2020 the Midland Independent School District voted to change the name of the former Robert E. Lee High School to Legacy High School in the wake of the George Floyd protests.

ECHS welcomed its first freshman class on August 24, 2009. It aims to award students their associate degrees from Midland College by the time they receive their high school diplomas.

The portion in Martin County is in the Stanton Independent School District.

Midland has many private schools, including Hillcrest School, Hillander, Midland Classical Academy, Midland Christian School, Midland Montessori, St. Ann's School, and Trinity School of Midland. It is also home to four charter schools: Richard Milburn Academy, Premier High School, Texas Leadership Charter Academy, and Midland Academy Charter School.

== Media ==
=== Newspapers ===
Midland is served by the Midland Reporter-Telegram.

=== Radio ===
- KLFB 88.1 FM (Religious)
- KFRI 88.7 FM (Christian Contemporary)
- KBMM 89.5 FM (Religious)
- KTPR 89.9 FM (Texas Public Radio)
- KLVW 90.5 FM (Christian Contemporary)
- KVDG 90.9 FM (Spanish)
- KXWT 91.3 FM (Public Radio)
- WJFM 91.7 FM (Gospel Music)
- KNFM 92.3 FM (Country)
- KZBT 93.3 FM (Hip-Hop)
- KACD 94.1 FM (Spanish)
- KTXO 94.7 FM (Country)
- KQRX 95.1 FM (Rock)
- KMRK-FM 96.1 FM (Country)
- KMCM 96.9 FM (Oldies)
- KODM 97.9 FM (Adult Contemporary)
- KHKX 99.1 FM (Country)
- KMTH 99.5 FM (Public Radio)
- KBAT 99.9 FM (Rock)
- KMMZ 101.3 FM (Regional Mexican)
- KFZX 102.1 FM (Classic Rock)
- KCRS 103.3 FM (Top-40)
- KTXC 104.7 FM (Regional Mexican)
- KCHX 106.7 FM (Adult Contemporary)
- KWEL 107.1 FM (Talk)
- KQLM 107.9 FM (Spanish)
- KCRS 550 AM (News/Talk)
- KXOI 810 AM (Spanish)
- KFLB 920 AM (Religious)
- KWEL 1070 AM (Talk)
- KLPF 1180 AM (Religious)
- KMND 1510 AM (Sports)

=== Television ===
Midland is served by nine local television stations: KMID, an ABC affiliate; KWES-TV, an NBC affiliate; KOSA, a CBS affiliate and a MyNetworkTV affiliate on their digital cable TV station; KPEJ-TV, a Fox affiliate; KPBT-TV, a PBS affiliate; KWWT, a MeTV affiliate; KUPB, a Univision affiliate; and KTLE-LD, a Telemundo affiliate. It also has a religious television station: KMLM-DT, an affiliate of God's Learning Channel, a worldwide institution offering pro-Israel programming.

Midland is the location for Taylor Sheridan's new series Landman.

Many major motion pictures have been filmed in and around Midland, including Hangar 18, Waltz Across Texas, Fandango, Blood Simple, Hard Country, Friday Night Lights, The Rookie, The Three Burials of Melquiades Estrada, Everybody's Baby: The Rescue of Jessica McClure (which featured, as extras, many participants in the actual rescue and its coverage), and others.

The Midland-Odessa area is a focal point for many of the TV series Heroes's first-season episodes, serving as the Bennet family home and as the location of the Burnt Toast Diner.

== Transportation ==
Midland is served by Midland International Air and Space Port (ICAO code: KMAF, IATA code: MAF), which is located between Odessa and Midland. Midland Airpark (ICAO code: KMDD, IATA code: MDD) is a general aviation airport located on Midland's northeast side. Midland was the site of the 2012 Midland train crash, in which a train collided with a parade float carrying wounded military veterans, killing four. Midland also has citywide public bus services provided for the Midland-Odessa Urban Transit District by Midland-Odessa Transit Management, otherwise known as E-Z Rider.

=== Roads ===
- I-20 (Interstate 20)
- I-20 BL (Wall Street/Front Street/Former US 80)
- SH 140 (Florida Street)
- SH 158 (Garden City Highway)
- SH 191 (Highway 191/Sgt. Mike Naylor Memorial Highway)
- SH 349 (Big Spring Street)
- Loop 40
- Loop 250
- Loop 268 (Wall Street)
- FM 868 (Midland Drive)

== Sister cities ==
Midland has four sister cities around the world.

- Chihuahua, Chihuahua (Mexico)
- Dongying, Shandong (China), located near China's second-largest known oil field. A modest pagoda, located at the Beal Complex, was donated by Dongying officials. It has since been demolished.
- New Amsterdam (Guyana)
- Birkenhead (United Kingdom)
