= Ape (disambiguation) =

Apes are a superfamily of highly intelligent anthropoids.

Ape or APE may also refer to:

== People ==
- Ape, an alias of the 19th century artist Carlo Pellegrini (1839–1889)
- Keith Ape, South Korean rapper

=== Fictional characters ===
- Ape, a fictional character from the George of the Jungle franchise
- Ape (comics), a mutant character in the Marvel Comics universe

== Places ==
- Ape, Latvia, town in Latvia
  - Ape Parish, Ape Municipality, Latvia
- Ape Canyon, Plains of Abraham, Mount St. Helens, Washington, USA
- Ape Hill, Shoushan, Kaohsiung, Taiwan

== Science and technology ==
- Ape (plant), the Polynesian name for the giant taro plant
- Xanthosoma ('ape), tropical American plant
- Acute pulmonary edema, fluid accumulation on the lungs
- Anomalous photovoltaic effect, a type of a photovoltaic effect which occurs in semiconducting materials
- AP Environmental Science, the environmental science course in the Advanced Placement program
- Available potential energy, or convective available potential energy, the energy a parcel of air would have if lifted through the atmosphere

=== Computing ===
- AJAX Push Engine, an open source Comet/push server
- ANSI/POSIX Environment, a POSIX compatibility layer for the Plan 9 operating system
- APE tag, a tag format used to add metadata to digital audio files
- .ape, a filename extension used by Monkey's Audio
- APE100, a series of Italian supercomputers
- Application Enhancer, a product by Unsanity
- AVS plugin effect, any third-party addition to the Advanced Visualization Studio computer software
- Auckland Peering Exchange, a peering point serving Auckland, New Zealand

== Arts and entertainment ==
- The Apes, a 1929 novel by Eden Phillpotts
- Agency to Prevent Evil, a fictional agency in Lancelot Link, Secret Chimp
- Animals project editor in the computer game Zoo Tycoon
- APE Con or Alternative Press Expo, an annual comics convention
- "The Ape", a song by Level 42 on the album Guaranteed
- The Apes, a band from Washington, D.C.

=== Films ===
- The Ape (1940 film) starring Boris Karloff
- Ape (1976 film)
- The Ape (2005 film)
- The Ape (2009 film), a Swedish film
- Ape (2012 film)

== Transportation ==
- Piaggio Ape, a small Italian tricycle pickup-truck
- Honda Ape, a Japanese minibike
- APE 4.80, a passenger trailer for the road

== Other uses ==
- Adapted physical education, for learners with a disability
- Annual premium equivalent, a measure used for comparison of life insurance revenue
- APE Foundation (Association for the Protection of the Environment)
- APE, a stock market ticker for AMC Theatres, an American movie theater chain
- Ape, Inc., a video game development company
- Bukiyip language of Papua New Guinea (ISO 639 code: ape)
- Hape people, an extinct Native American tribe

== See also ==
- Ile Ape, Lembata, Indonesia
- Apeman (disambiguation)
- Great apes (disambiguation)
