= Tarzan of the Apes (disambiguation) =

Tarzan of the Apes is a novel by American writer Edgar Rice Burroughs

Tarzan of the Apes may also refer to:

- Tarzan of the Apes (1918 film), an American action/adventure silent film
- Tarzan of the Apes (1999 film), an animated musical adventure film

== See also ==
- Tarzan (disambiguation)
- Tarzan, the Ape Man (disambiguation)
