= Stanton Elementary School =

Stanton Elementary School may refer to:

- M. Hall Stanton Public School, Philadelphia, Pennsylvania
- Stanton Elementary School, Washington, D.C. - District of Columbia Public Schools
- Stanton Elementary School, El Paso, Texas - El Paso Independent School District
- Stanton Elementary School, Stanton, Texas - Stanton Independent School District
