= Stanton High School (Texas) =

Location
- 705 Koonce Street; Stanton, Texas 79782-0730; United States; 32.130669°N 101.805813°W

Information
- School type: Public high school
- School district: Stanton Independent School District
- Principal: Mark Cotton
- Staff: 24.04 (FTE)
- Grades: 9-12
- Enrollment: 317 (2023–2024)
- Student to teacher ratio: 13.19
- Colors: Red & Gray
- Athletics conference: UIL Class 3A
- Mascot: Buffalo
- Yearbook: The Round Up
- Website: Stanton High School

Stanton High School is a public high school located in the city of Stanton, Texas in Martin County, United States and classified as a 3A school by the UIL. It is a part of the Stanton Independent School District located in southeast Martin County. In 2015, the school was rated "Met Standard" by the Texas Education Agency.

== Athletics ==
The Stanton Buffaloes compete in these sports -

- Basketball
- Cross Country
- Football
- Golf
- Powerlifting
- Tennis
- Track and Field

=== State Titles ===
- Football -
  - 1997(2A)
- Boys Golf -
  - 1986(2A)
- Boys Powerlifting
  - 2022(3A)
- Girls Powerlifting
  - 2022(3A)

== Notable alumni ==
- Steve Fryar, professional steer wrestler
