= Raymon Lacy =

American baseball player (1922–2020)

- Born: August 12, 1922; Bullard, Texas
- Died: February 10, 2020 (aged 97); Wiergate, Texas

Negro league baseball debut
- 1947, for the Homestead Grays

Last appearance
- 1949, for the Houston Eagles

Teams
- Homestead Grays (1947); Houston Eagles (1949)

Raymon Taylor Lacy (August 12, 1922 – February 10, 2020) was an American Negro league baseball player in the 1940s.

A native of Bullard, Texas, Lacy attended Stanton High School, Prairie View A&M University, Texas College and Stephen F. Austin State University. He served in the United States military during World War II, and played on various semi-pro and barnstorming teams in the 1940s. In 1947, Lacy played for the Homestead Grays, and in 1949 for the Houston Eagles. Following his baseball career, he was a high school teacher, coach and administrator in various Texas school systems. Lacy died in Wiergate, Texas in 2020 at age 97.
