= Apeman =

Apeman or ape-man may refer to:

- historically, a term for archaic humans, see:
  - Missing link (human evolution)
  - Pithecanthropus ("ape-man"), historical taxon now synonymous with Homo
  - Chimpanzee–human last common ancestor
- Hominid cryptid creatures like Bigfoot and Yeti
- Humanzee, hypothetical human-chimpanzee hybrids

== Popular culture ==
- Tarzan, sometimes referred to as an "Apeman"
- Mangani in the Tarzan fictional stories
- different ape-men species from Kull's Thurian Age and Conan's Hyborian Age
- evolved apes in the Planet of the Apes universe
- Ape-Man, a comic book character
- "Apeman" (song), a 1970 song by The Kinks
- The Apemen (band), a Dutch surf rock band
- The Ape Man (film), 1943 U.S. sci-fi horror film

== Other uses ==
- Tarzan, the Ape Man (disambiguation)

== See also ==
- The Ape Woman, a 1964 Italian-French drama film directed by Marco Ferreri
- Anthropopithecus, called "man-ape", historical taxon now synonymous with Pan (the chimpanzee)
- Caveman
- Hominidae
- Mythic humanoids, legendary, folkloric, or mythological creatures that are part human
- Neanderthals in popular culture
- Man-Ape, a Marvel Comics character
- Humanoid (disambiguation)
- Ape (disambiguation)
- Man (disambiguation)
