= Tarzan (disambiguation) =

Tarzan is a character created by writer Edgar Rice Burroughs.

Tarzan may also refer to:

== Literature ==
- Tarzan (book series)
- Tarzan: The Greystoke Legacy, a 2011 young-adult novel by Andy Briggs

== Film and stage ==
- Tarzan of the Apes (1918 film), first (silent) film adaptation of Edgar Rice Burroughs' novel
- Tarzan the Ape Man (1932 film), starring Johnny Weissmuller
- Tarzan, the Ape Man (1981 film), starring Bo Derek and Miles O'Keeffe
- Tarzan (franchise), a Disney franchise
  - Tarzan (1999 film), Disney's 1999 animated film
  - Tarzan (1999 soundtrack), the soundtrack
  - Tarzan (musical), a 2006 Disney Broadway musical based on the 1999 film
- Tarzan (2013 film), an animated film
- The Legend of Tarzan (2016 film), starring Alexander Skarsgård

== Television ==
- Tarzan (1966 TV series), an American series starring Ron Ely that aired 1966–68 on NBC
- Tarzan, Lord of the Jungle, an animated CBS series that aired 1976–80
- Tarzán, a French-Canadian-Mexican TV series that aired 1991–94
- Tarzan: The Epic Adventures, an American TV series that aired in syndication for the 1996–97 season
- Tarzan (2003 TV series), an American series starring Travis Fimmel that aired on The WB

== Video games ==
- Tarzan: Lord of the Jungle, a 1994 game
- Tarzan (video game), a 1999 platform game

== People ==
- Tarzan (nickname)
- Tarzan Milošević (born 1954), Montenegrin politician, former Minister for Agriculture and Rural Development
- Tarzan Goto, a ring name of Japanese professional wrestler Masaji Goto (born 1963)
- Tarzán López and El Tarzán, ring names of Mexican luchador (professional wrestler) Carlos López (1912–1975)
- Tarzan Taborda, Portuguese professional wrestler Albano Taborda (1935–2005)
- Tarzan Tyler and Tarzan Tourville, ring names of Canadian professional wrestler Camille Tourville (1927–1985)
- João Tarzan, Portuguese footballer João Miguel Ferreira Rodrigues (born 1994)
- Tarzan, Russian actor, singer and bodybuilder Sergei Glushko (born 1970)
- Tarzan of Manisa, Turkish environmentalist
- Soumaine Ndodeba alias Tarzan, Central African warlord

== Places ==
- Tarzan, Iran, a village in Lorestan Province
- Tarzan, Texas, an unincorporated community
- Tarzan River, Guam

== Other uses ==
- Tarzan (radio program), a generic title for three old-time radio series, two in the 1930s and one in the 1950s.
- AutoVAZ Tarzan, a Russian 4-wheel drive vehicle manufactured by AutoVAZ
- Tarzán (mascot), the college mascot from the University of Puerto Rico at Mayagüez
- A character in the 1991 Hong Kong film Riki-Oh: The Story of Ricky (in the English language dub version)
- The mascot of the former Stockton High School in Stockton, California

== See also ==
- Tarazan (disambiguation)
- The Legend of Tarzan (disambiguation)
- Lord of the Jungle (disambiguation)
- ASM-A-1 Tarzon, an American air-to-surface missile
- Taarzan: The Wonder Car, a 2004 romantic thriller Bollywood film
