= FBW =

FBW may refer to:

- Fighter Bomber Wing, a unit of the U.S. Air Force
- Fly-by-wire, a kind of aircraft flight control system
- Franz Brozincevic Wetzikon, a Swiss manufacturer of trucks, motorbuses and trolleybuses
- Deutsche Film- und Medienbewertung (FBW) (formerly Filmbewertungsstelle Wiesbaden), a German federal state authority which evaluates films
- Fleet Base West, a Royal Australian Navy major fleet base near the city of Perth
