= Badgett, Texas =

Ghost town in Texas, US

Badgett is a ghost town in Martin County, Texas, United States. Situated on Farm to Market Road 1212, its namesake is R. A. Badgett and his family, settlers from Mitchell County. At some point between 1916 and 1926, its school was opened; it was consolidated by nearby Courtney in the 1940s. It was later abandoned.
