= Ackerly, Texas =

- City
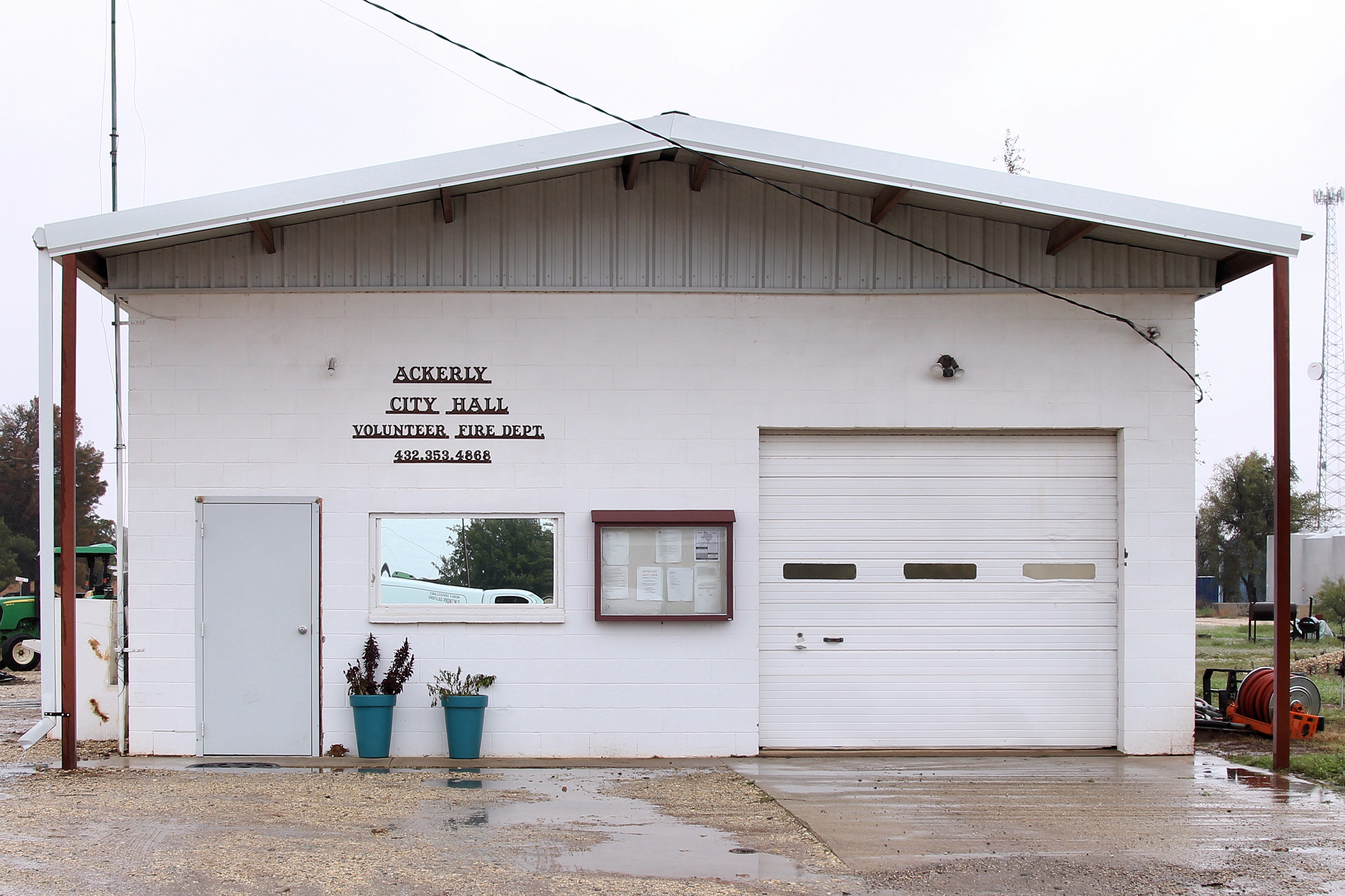
- Ackerly City Hall
- Interactive map of Ackerly, Texas
- Coordinates: 32°31′32″N 101°42′51″W
- Country: United States
- State: Texas
- Counties: Dawson, Martin

Area
  - Total: 0.31 sq mi (0.81 km^{2})
  - Land: 0.31 sq mi (0.81 km^{2})
  - Water: 0 sq mi (0.00 km^{2})
- Elevation: 2,802 ft (854 m)

Population (2020)
  - Total: 264
  - Density: 746.3/sq mi (288.13/km^{2})
- Time zone: UTC-6 (Central (CST))
  - Summer (DST): UTC-5 (CDT)
- ZIP code: 79713
- Area code: 432
- FIPS code: 48-01108
- GNIS feature ID: 1329187

Ackerly is a city in Dawson and Martin Counties in the U.S. state of Texas. As of the 2020 Census, the population was 264. The Martin county portion of Ackerly is part of the Midland-Odessa metropolitan area.

== History ==
The town was established in 1923 and named for the town founder Paul Ackerly. In 1995, a local discovered the Ackerly meteorite while plowing his cotton field.

== Geography ==
Ackerly is located at 32°31′32″N 101°42′51″W (32.525563, –101.714242).

According to the United States Census Bureau, the city has a total area of 0.3 square miles (0.8 km^{2}), all land.

== Demographics ==
Historical population
| Census | Pop. | Note | %± |
|---|---|---|---|
| 1970 | 348 | | — |
| 1980 | 317 | | −8.9% |
| 1990 | 243 | | −23.3% |
| 2000 | 245 | | 0.8% |
| 2010 | 220 | | −10.2% |
| 2020 | 264 | | 20.0% |
U.S. Decennial Census

=== 2020 census ===
As of the 2020 census, Ackerly had a population of 264. The median age was 33.0 years, 34.8% of residents were under the age of 18, and 12.1% of residents were 65 years of age or older. For every 100 females there were 88.6 males, and for every 100 females age 18 and over there were 93.3 males age 18 and over.

There were 72 households in Ackerly, of which 59.7% had children under the age of 18 living in them. Of all households, 65.3% were married-couple households, 8.3% were households with a male householder and no spouse or partner present, and 19.4% were households with a female householder and no spouse or partner present. About 11.2% of all households were made up of individuals, and 4.2% had someone living alone who was 65 years of age or older.

There were 89 housing units, of which 19.1% were vacant. Among occupied housing units, 63.9% were owner-occupied and 36.1% were renter-occupied. The homeowner vacancy rate was <0.1% and the rental vacancy rate was 16.1%.

0% of residents lived in urban areas, while 100.0% lived in rural areas.

Racial composition as of the 2020 census
| Race | Percent |
|---|---|
| White | 70.1% |
| Black or African American | 0% |
| American Indian and Alaska Native | 1.1% |
| Asian | 0% |
| Native Hawaiian and Other Pacific Islander | 0.8% |
| Some other race | 12.1% |
| Two or more races | 15.9% |
| Hispanic or Latino (of any race) | 48.9% |

=== 2000 census ===
As of the census of 2000, 245 people, 80 households, and 60 families resided in the city. The population density was 792.5 inhabitants per square mile (306.0/km^{2}). There were 96 housing units at an average density of 310.5 per square mile (119.9/km^{2}). The racial makeup of the city was 69.80% White, 28.98% from other races, and 1.22% from two or more races. Hispanics or Latinos of any race were 48.98% of the population.

Of 80 households, 45.0% had children under the age of 18 living with them, 70.0% were married couples living together, 3.8% had a female householder with no husband present, and 25.0% were not families. About 20.0% of all households were made up of individuals, and 7.5% had someone living alone who was 65 years of age or older. The average household size was 3.06 and the average family size was 3.65.

In the city, the population was distributed as 33.9% under the age of 18, 7.3% from 18 to 24, 23.3% from 25 to 44, 26.9% from 45 to 64, and 8.6% who were 65 years of age or older. The median age was 34 years. For every 100 females, there were 104.2 males. For every 100 females age 18 and over, there were 86.2 males.

The median income for a household in the city was $27,222, and for a family was $31,250. Males had a median income of $36,667 versus $15,000 for females. The per capita income for the city was $12,081. About 20.0% of families and 20.2% of the population were below the poverty line, including 25.7% of those under the age of 18 and 13.0% of those 65 or over.

== Education ==
The City of Ackerly is served by the Sands Consolidated Independent School District.

== Climate ==
The Köppen climate classification subtype for the Ackerly climate is BSk; it occurs primarily on the periphery of the true deserts in low-latitude semiarid steppe regions.

Climate data for Ackerly, Texas
| Month | Jan | Feb | Mar | Apr | May | Jun | Jul | Aug | Sep | Oct | Nov | Dec | Year |
|---|---|---|---|---|---|---|---|---|---|---|---|---|---|
| Mean daily maximum °C (°F) | 13 (55) | 16 (60) | 20 (68) | 26 (78) | 29 (85) | 34 (93) | 34 (94) | 34 (93) | 30 (86) | 25 (77) | 18 (65) | 14 (57) | 24 (76) |
| Mean daily minimum °C (°F) | −3 (26) | −1 (30) | 2 (36) | 7 (45) | 13 (55) | 18 (64) | 19 (66) | 18 (65) | 15 (59) | 9 (48) | 3 (37) | −2 (28) | 8 (46) |
| Average precipitation mm (inches) | 15 (0.6) | 18 (0.7) | 20 (0.8) | 28 (1.1) | 56 (2.2) | 61 (2.4) | 53 (2.1) | 46 (1.8) | 69 (2.7) | 51 (2) | 20 (0.8) | 18 (0.7) | 450 (17.8) |
Source: Weatherbase
