= Saurer 5 DUK =

Swiss bus model

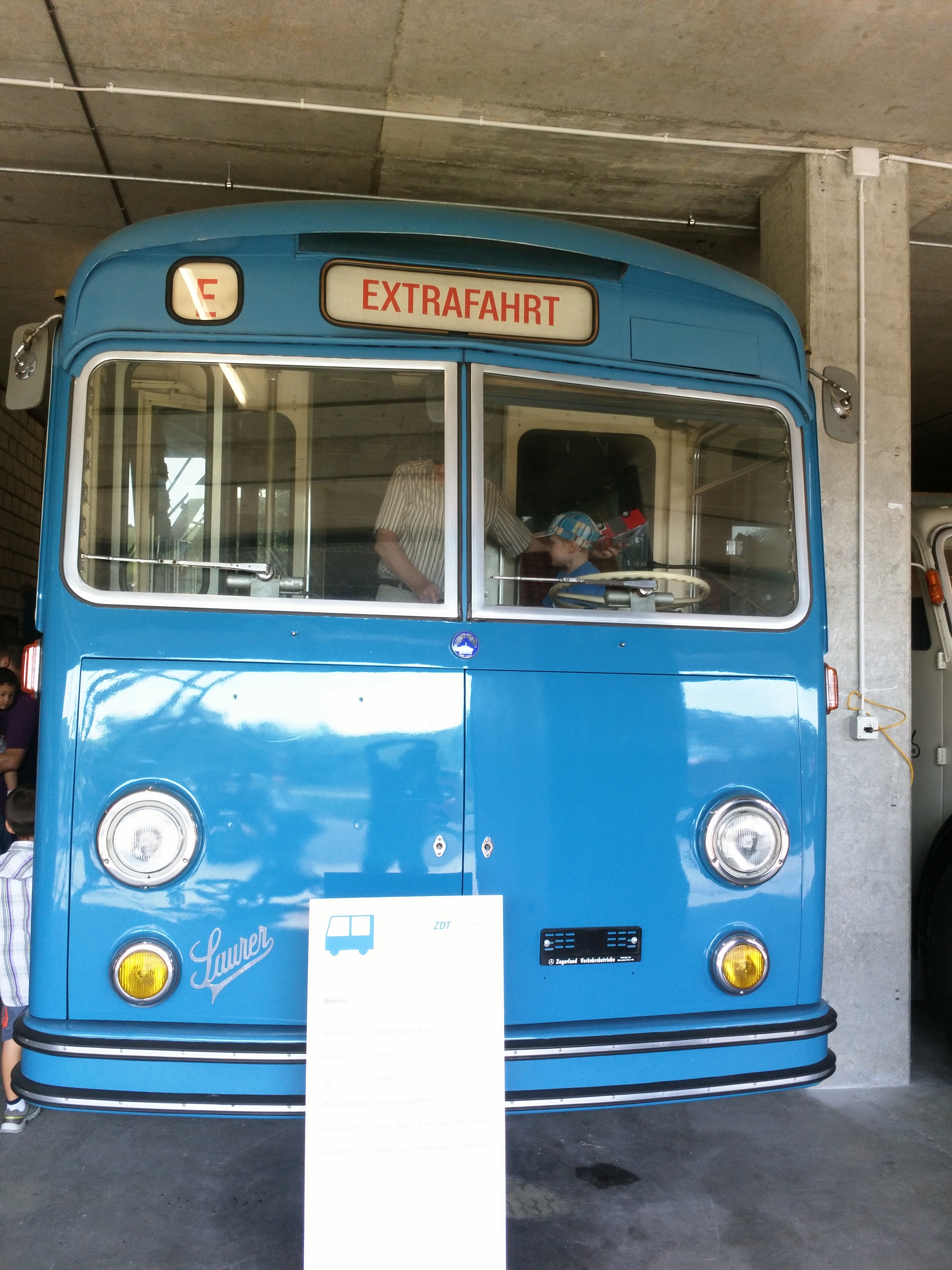
Saurer 5 DUK

The Saurer 5 DUK is a bus of the Swiss manufacturer Adolph Saurer AG, from Arbon.

== History and development ==
The Saurer 5 DUK is a left-steered bus and PostBus type of the former PTT operations and various regional bus / transport companies in Switzerland. DUK stands for Diesel-Unterflur-Kompressor (diesel underfloor compressor). At the post office, these Saurer 5 DUKs were used as postbus busses or as postbus busses with a single axle luggage trailer. The Saurer 5 DUK was built from 1953 on.

It has a driver's seat, 39 passenger seats, 33 standing places and a luggage compartment. The luggage compartment is directly behind the rear exit door and has a partition with sliding door with glass panes. There are also seats in the luggage compartment. The passenger compartment is divided in the middle by a partition with a door, because in the past the rear part of the bus was designed as a smoking compartment. With the prohibition of smoking in public buses only the doors of the smoking compartment were removed, and the rest of the partition remained. For PTT operations, these Saurer 5 DUKs were used as single postbus busses, or as postbus busses with a single axle luggage trailer.

In the Zugerland transport companies ZVB (German: Zugerland Verkehrsbetrieben), these buses were mainly used on the mountain lines Zug-Ägeri (line 1) and Zug-Menzingen (line 2).

The ZVB buses were also equipped with split dispenser in front of the rear wheels in order to achieve better grip on snow and ice. These are used as pure buses, as buses with the passenger trailer APE 4.80 or with the passenger trailer APE 4.80 and the luggage trailer AGP 3. These trailer were used also by the successor model, the FBW 91U EU4A.

Without a trailer, a maximum speed of 120 km/h (75 mph) would have been possible.

By 1975/76, the Saurer 5 DUK was replaced by more modern vehicles such as the FBW 91U EU4A bus with Hess superstructures.

With the purchase in 1975, together with the orange buses, which were held in VST unit paintwork, additional new ordered APE 4.80 trailers got also the orange paintwork and not the blue one like the Saurer 5 DUK and the older APE 4.80.

Some Saurer 5 DUK were sold to Eastern European countries.

A Saurer 5 DUK of the ZVB is located in the Zug depot technology history (German: Zuger Depot Technikgeschichte).

== Data ==
Engine power	162 kW (220 Hp) at 1'900/min.
Length	11 '000 mm
Width	2'500 mm
Height	3,150 mm

== Gallery ==
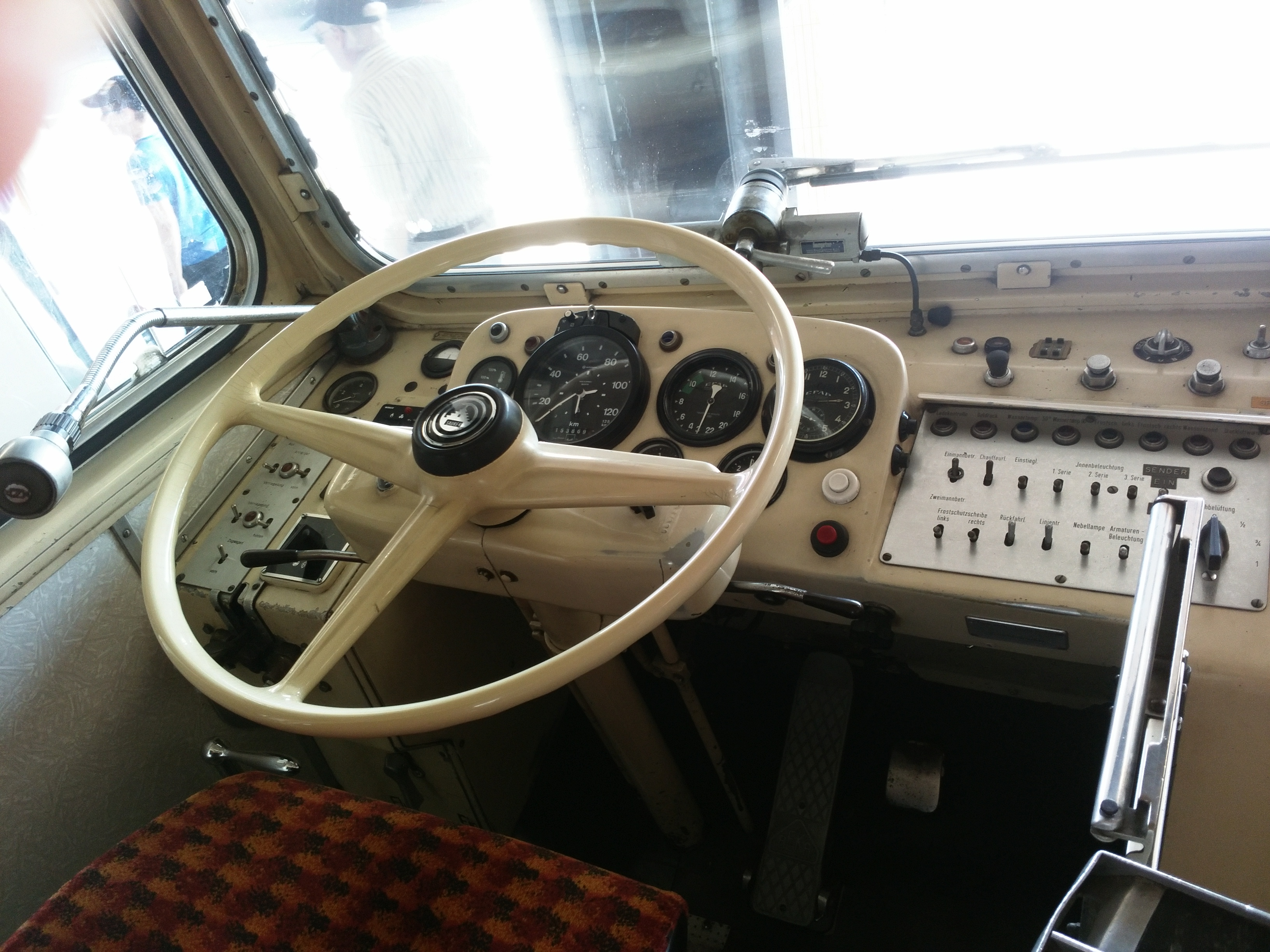
Cockpit

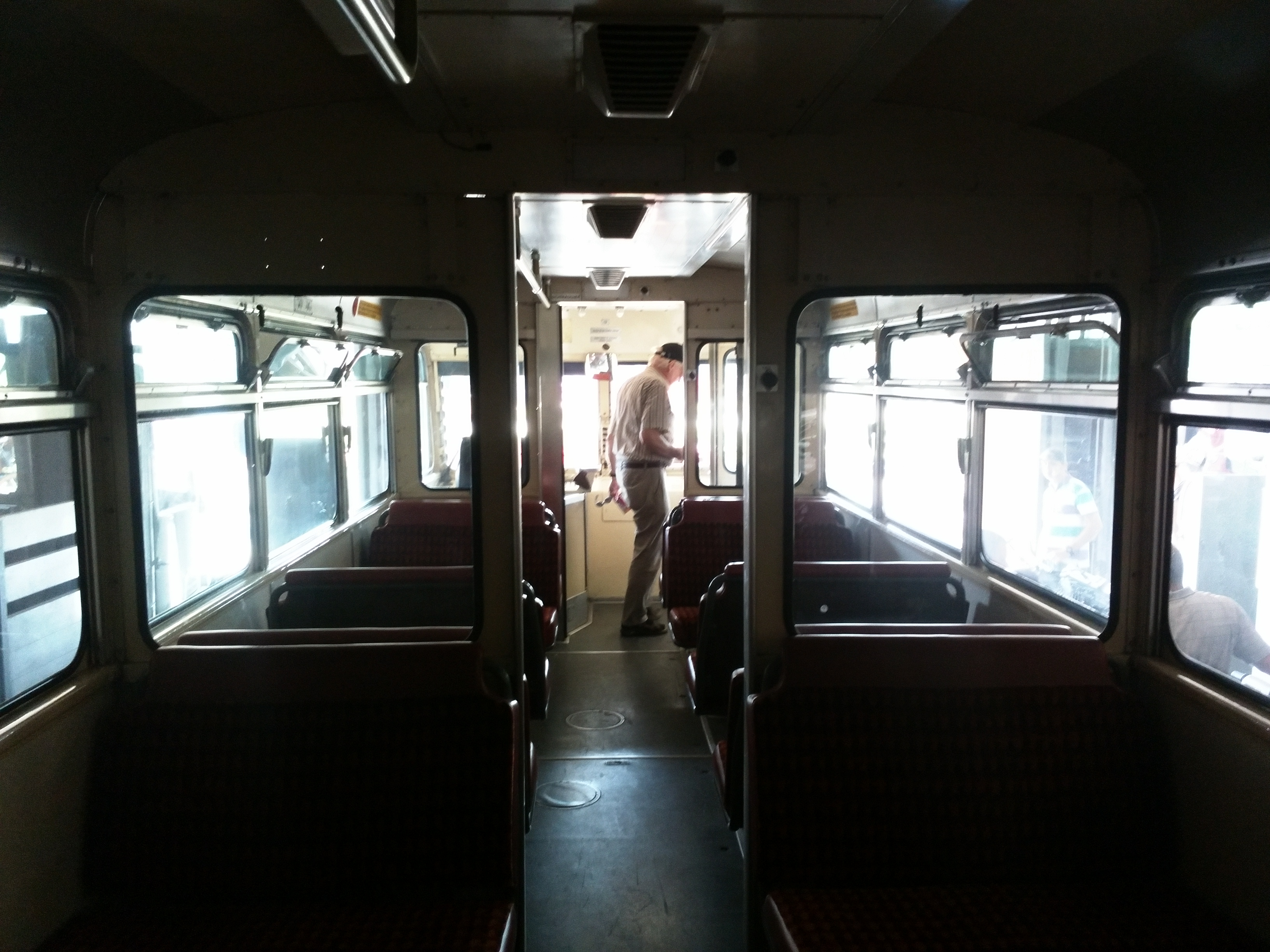
Passenger compartment

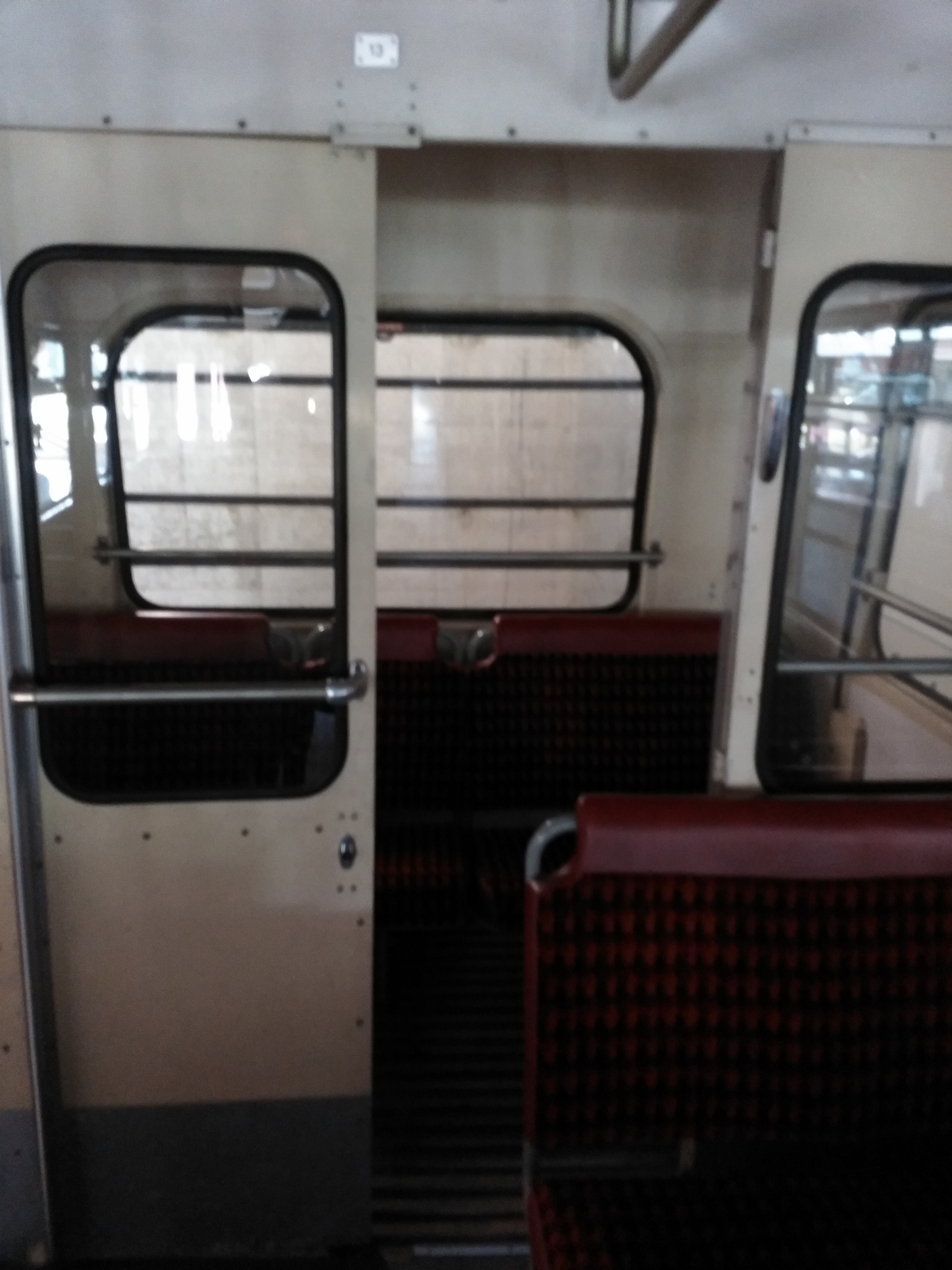
Luggage compartment

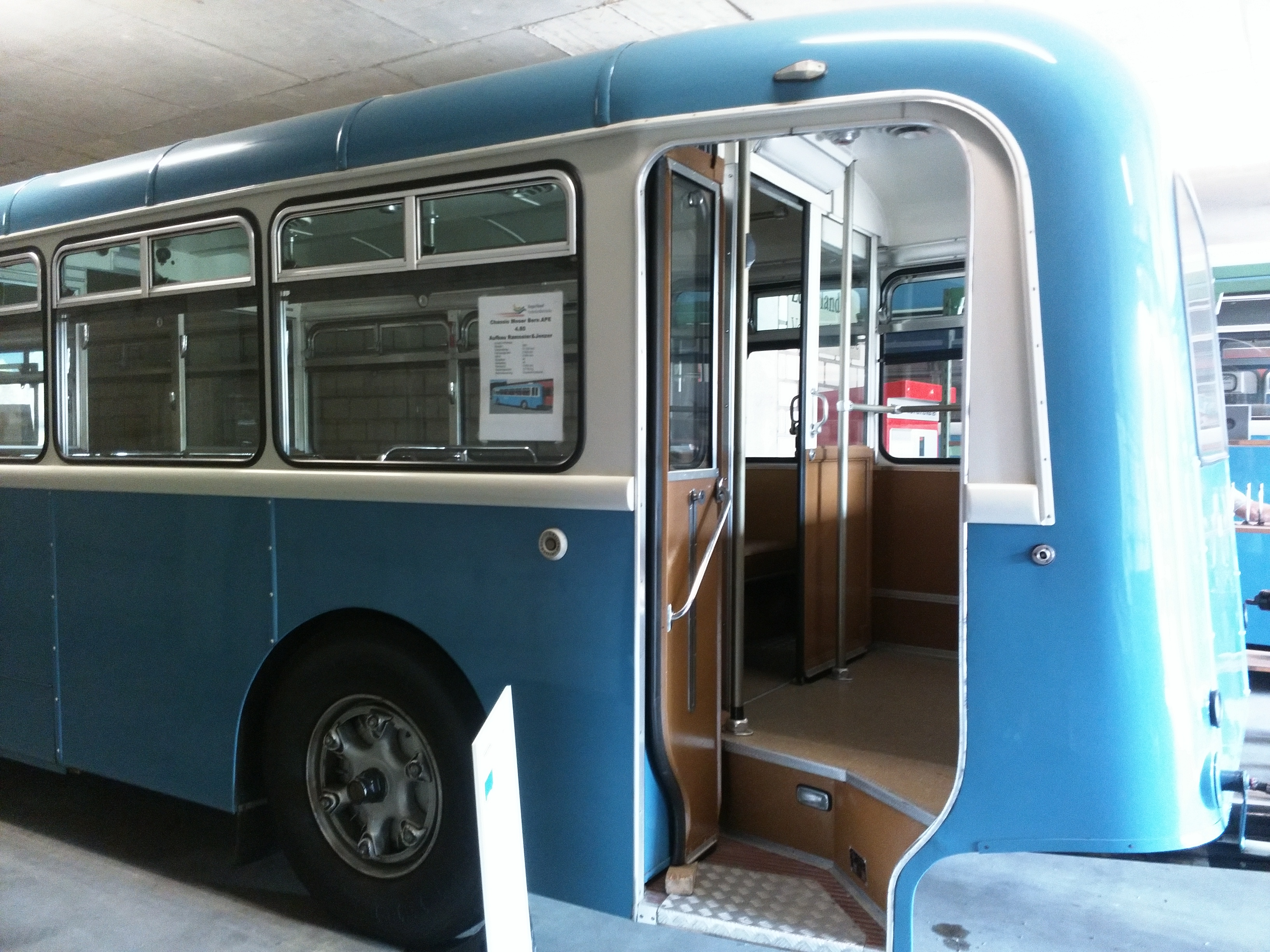
ZVB passenger trailer APE 4.80

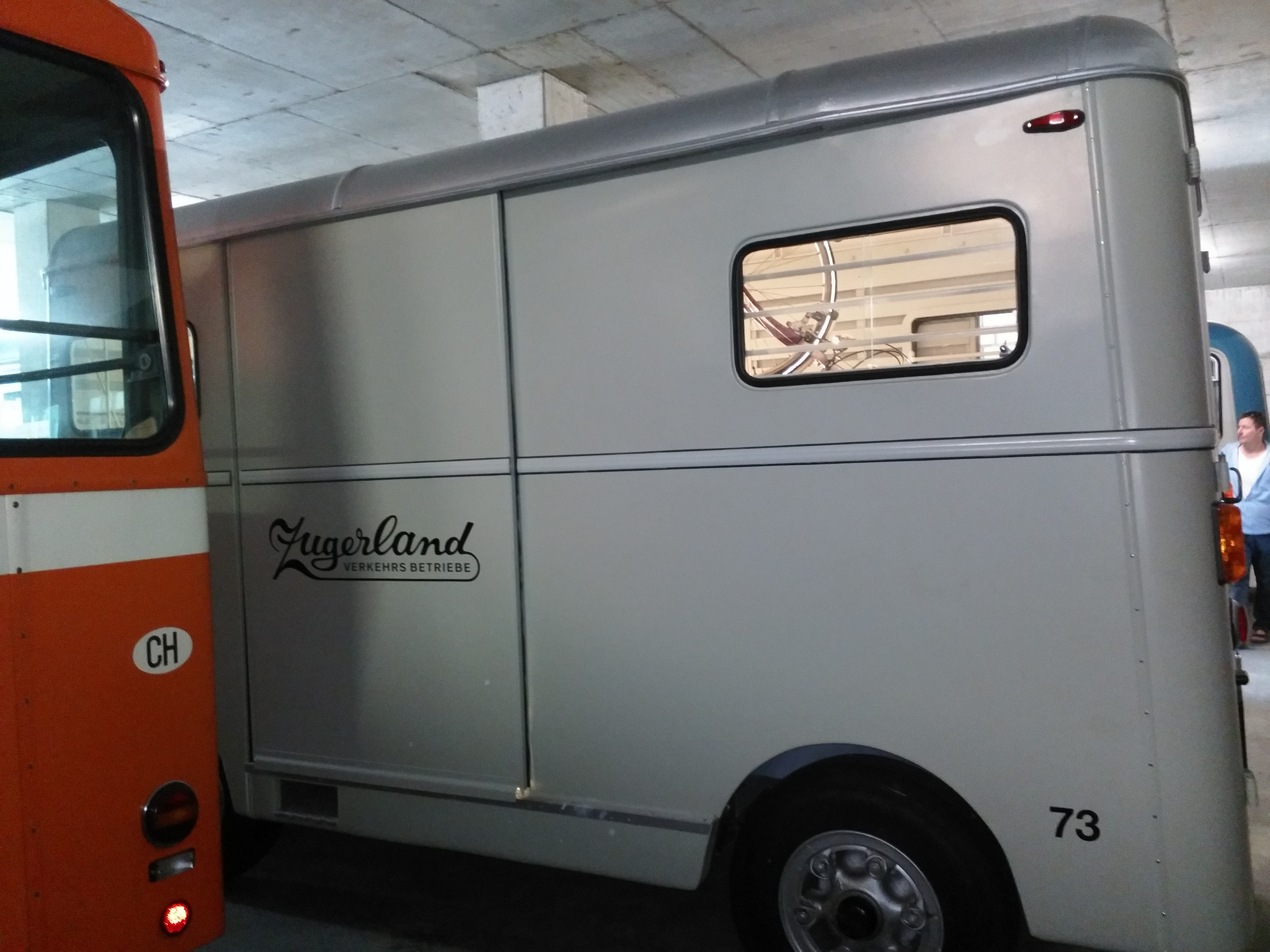
ZVB luggage trailer AGP 3
