= Sands Consolidated Independent School District =

School district in Texas

Location
- Ackerly, Texas United States
- Coordinates: 32°31′36.7″N 101°42′38.1″W

District information
- Type: Public
- Grades: Pre-K – 12
- Schools: 1

Students and staff
- Athletic conference: UIL Class A (six-man football)

Sands Consolidated Independent School District is a public school district based in Ackerly, Texas (USA).

The district serves parts of four counties - southeast Dawson, northeast Martin, southwest Borden, and northwest Howard.

Sands Consolidated ISD has one school that serves students in grades pre-kindergarten (pre-k) through twelve.

== Academic achievement ==
In 2009, the school district was rated "recognized" by the Texas Education Agency.

== Special programs ==
=== Athletics ===
Sands High School plays six-man football.

== See also ==
- List of school districts in Texas
