= Lord of the Jungle =

Lord of the Jungle may refer to:

- Lord of the Jungle (film), a 1955 American film in the Bomba, the Jungle Boy series
- Lord of the Jungle (Dynamite), a Dynamite Entertainment comic book based on public domain Tarzan novels
- Tarzan, Lord of the Jungle (novel), a Tarzan novel by Edgar Rice Burroughs
- Tarzan, Lord of the Jungle, a Saturday morning cartoon by Filmation

== See also ==
- Tarzan (disambiguation)
