= Ackerly meteorite =

Meteorite found in the United States

- Type: Ordinary chondrite
- Class: L5
- Weathering grade: W4
- Country: United States
- Region: Ackerly, Texas
- Coordinates: 32°35′25″N 101°46′20″W
- Observed fall: No
- Found date: June 1995
- TKW: 3.05 kilograms (6.7 lb)

Ackerly meteorite is a meteorite of 3.05 kilograms (6.7 lb) found in 1995 in Ackerly, Texas, United States.

== See also ==
- Glossary of meteoritics
