= Lenorah, Texas =

Unincorporated community in Texas, US

- unincorporated community
- Interactive map of Lenorah, Texas
- Coordinates: 32°16′18″N 101°52′34″W
- Country: United States
- State: Texas
- County: Martin

Lenorah is an unincorporated community in Martin County, Texas, United States. The ZIP Code for Lenorah is 79749.

== Education ==
The Grady Independent School District serves area students.
