= Tarzan, the Ape Man =

Tarzan, the Ape Man may refer to:

- Tarzan, a fictional character
- Tarzan the Ape Man (1932 film), with Johnny Weissmuller
- Tarzan, the Ape Man (1959 film) with Denny Miller
- Tarzan, the Ape Man (1981 film) with Richard Harris and Bo Derek

== See also ==
- Tarzan (disambiguation)
- Apeman (disambiguation)
