= FBW 91U EU4A =

Swiss bus model

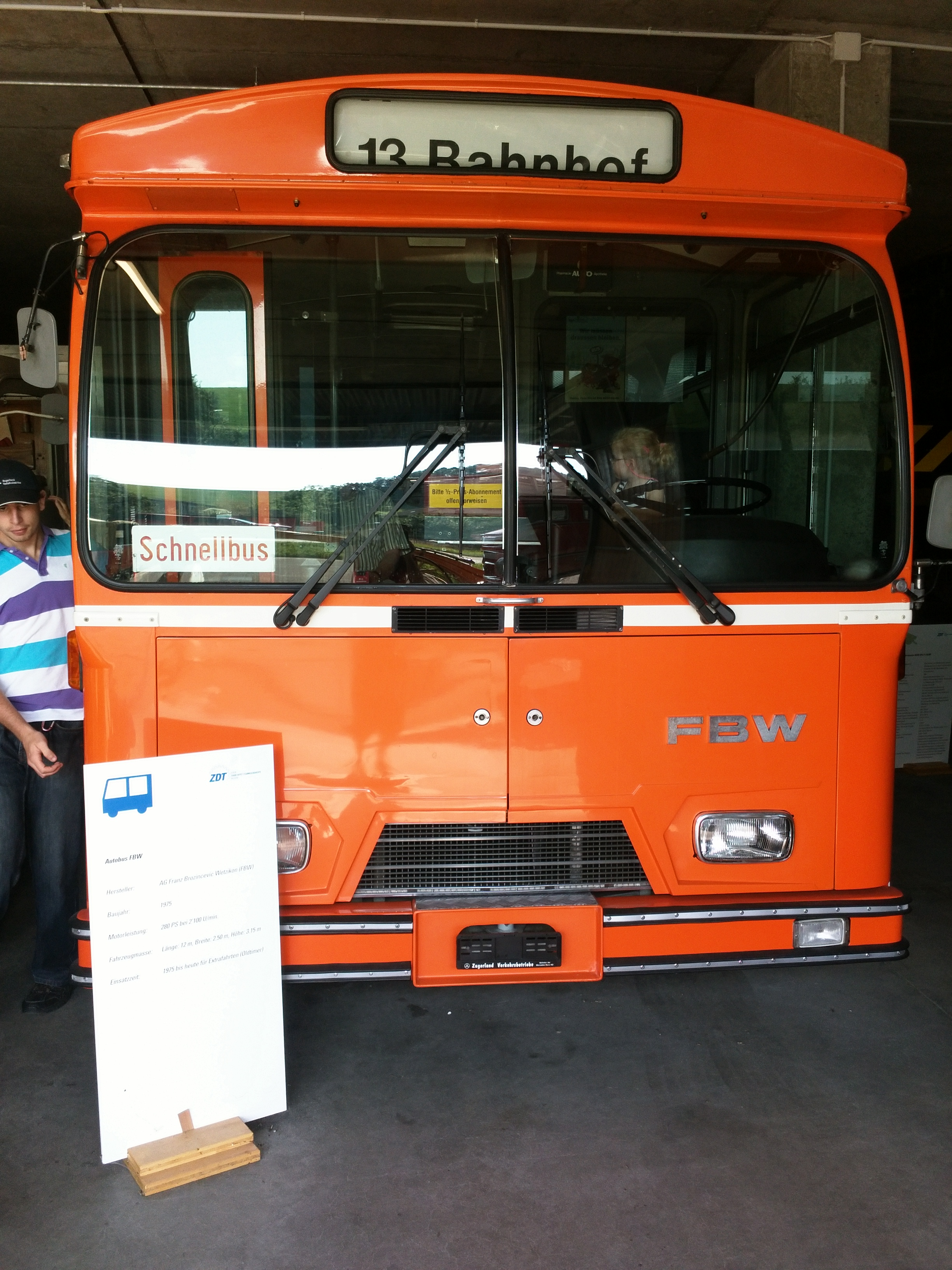
ZVB FBW 91U EU4A bus

The FBW 91U EU4A is a bus of the Swiss manufacturer Franz Brozincevic Wetzikon (FBW), from Wetzikon.

== History and development ==
The FBW 91U EU4A is a left-steered bus type used by various regional bus / transport companies in Switzerland. The body is from Hess. The FBW 91U EU4A has a luggage compartment, which is located directly behind the rear exit door and has a partition with a sliding door with glass panes. There are also seats in the luggage compartment. In the Zugerland transport companies ZVB (German: Zugerland Verkehrsbetrieben), these buses were mainly used on the mountain lines Zug-Ägeri (line 1) and Zug-Menzingen (line 2). The ZVB buses were also equipped with split dispenser in front of the rear wheels in order to achieve better grip on snow and ice. These are as pure buses, as buses with the passenger trailer APE 4.80 or with the passenger trailer APE 4.80 and the luggage trailer AGP 3. These trailers were used already from the predecessor model the Saurer 5 DUK. With the purchase in 1975, together with the orange buses, which were held in VST unit paintwork, new ordered APE 4.80 trailers got also the orange paintwork. An FBW 91U EU4A of the ZVB is located in the Zug depot technology history (German: Zuger Depot Technikgeschichte).

== Data ==
engine power	205 kW (280 Hp) at 2'100/min.
Length	12 '000 mm
Width	2'500 mm
Height	3,150 mm

== Pictures ==
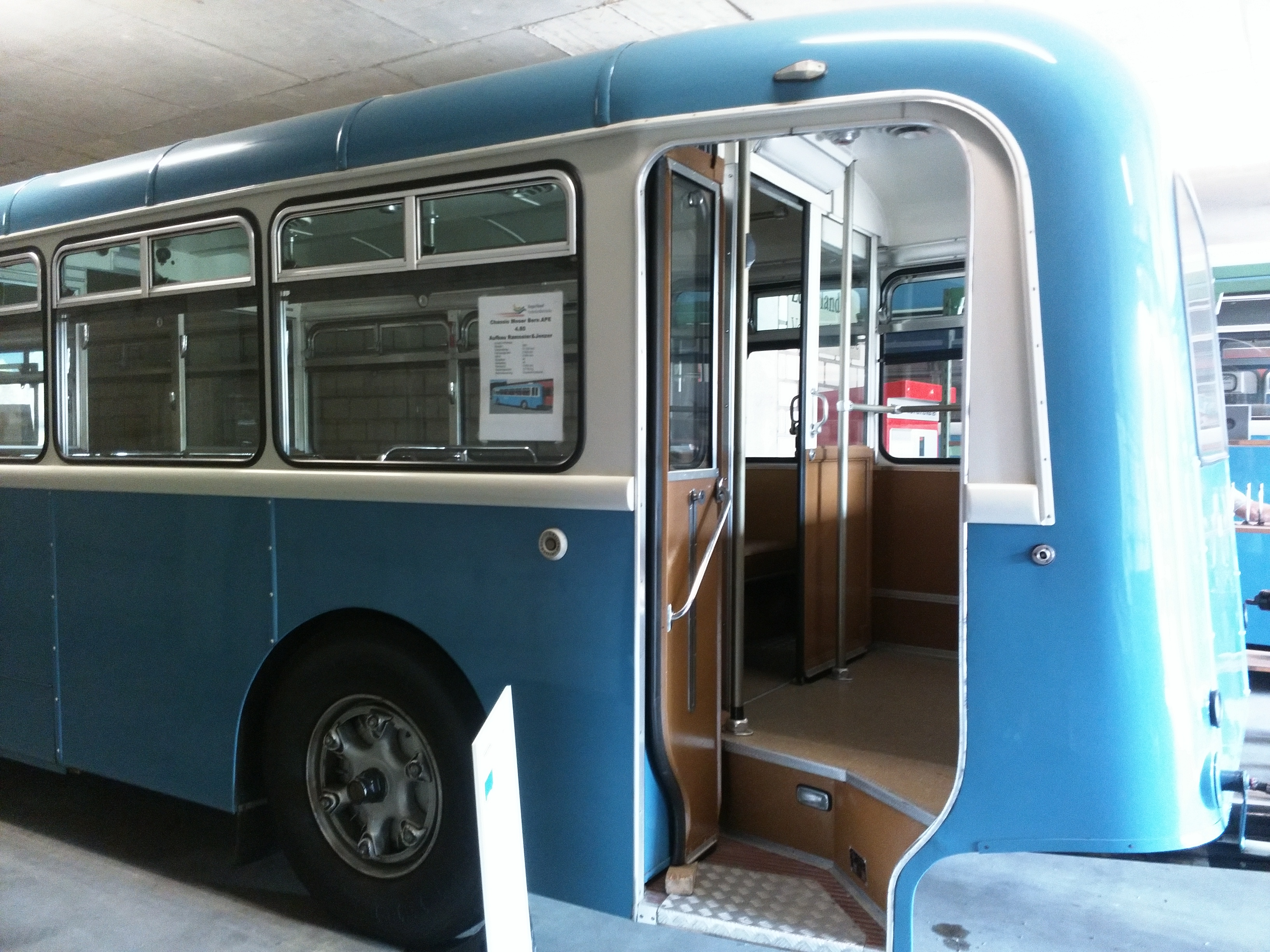
ZVB passenger trailer APE 4.80

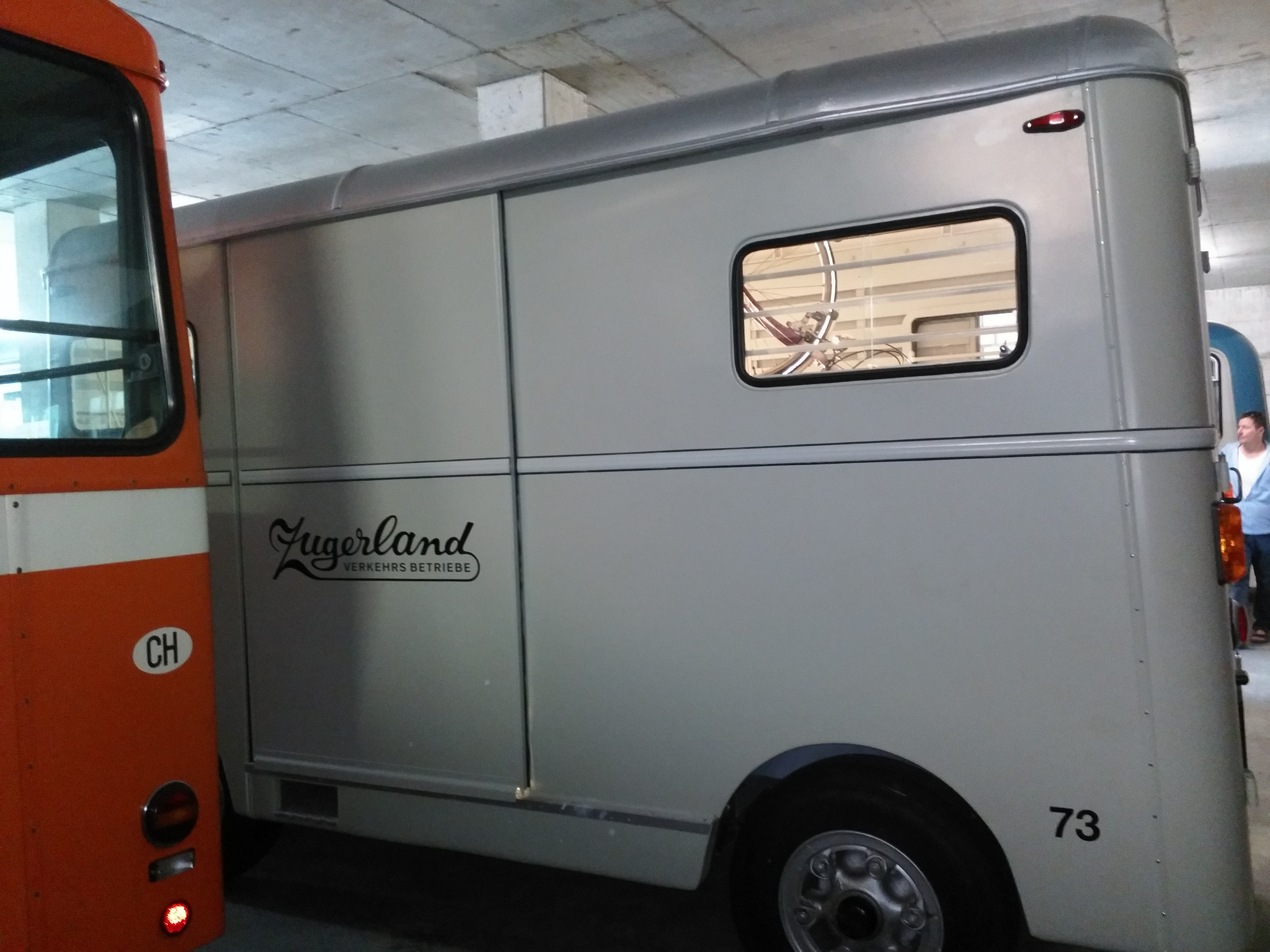
ZVB luggage trailer AGP 3
