= The Legend of Tarzan =

The Legend of Tarzan may refer to:

- The Legend of Tarzan (TV series), a 2001–2003 animated series
- The Legend of Tarzan (film), a 2016 film directed by David Yates
  - The Legend of Tarzan (soundtrack), a soundtrack album to the 2016 film
- Greystoke: The Legend of Tarzan, Lord of the Apes. a 1984 film directed by Hugh Hudson

== See also ==
- Tarzan (disambiguation)
