= Great apes (disambiguation) =

Great apes are apes in the family Hominidae.

Great apes may also refer to:

- Great Apes (novel), a novel by Will Self
- Pongidae, or "great apes", an obsolete taxonomic family
