= Tarzan, Texas =

Unincorporated community in Texas, US

Coordinates: 32°18′19″N 101°58′31″W

Location of Tarzan within the state of Texas

Tarzan is an unincorporated community in Martin County, Texas, United States. In 1990, Tarzan had approximately six occupied homes, a post office, cotton gin and a crossroads store to serve the local farming area.

The Grady Independent School District serves area students.

The community was named after Edgar Rice Burroughs' fictional character Tarzan. It has frequently been noted on lists of unusual place names.

== Etymology ==
In 1926, Tant and Viola Lindsay moved to the community, which was then called South Plains. They opened a general store and wanted to add a post office, but the U.S. Postal Service informed them there was already a South Plains post office in Texas, so they had to apply under a different community name. Tant Lindsay wrote several possible names on the application, and because he liked reading Tarzan books, his wife told him to add that name to his list. Two weeks later, the Lindsays received approval of the Tarzan post office which, in 1983, was serving 500 customers.
