= Franz Brozincevic Wetzikon =

Swiss truck and bus manufacturer

1959 FBW model EDU underfloor diesel engine

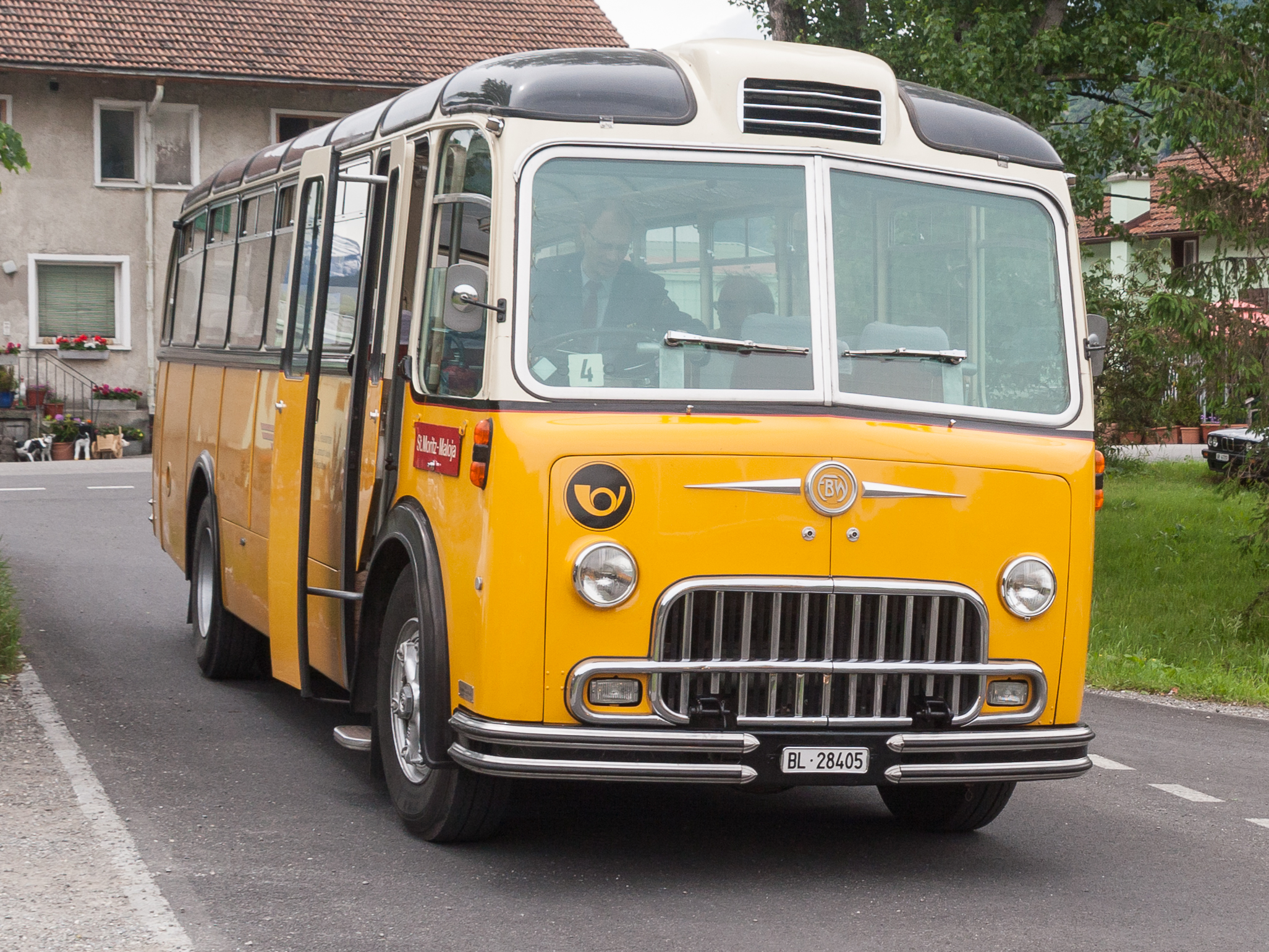
Postauto FBW C40U

Franz Brozincevic & Cie (FBW) was a Swiss maker of trucks, motorbuses and trolleybuses, founded by Croatian-born engineer and constructor Franjo (Franz) Brozinčević (1874-1933), active between 1922 and 1985 and based in Wetzikon, canton of Zürich.

== History ==
FBW gained an excellent reputation for the top-level engineering and the long-lasting life of its products, never producing series but instead making individually tailored vehicles. It used only components of its own manufacture, a costly system that allowed the company to produce only a few hundred units per year.

Notable designs from FBW included the underfloor-engined trucks, in production since 1949.

In 1982, FBW was merged with its Swiss competitor, Saurer, to form Nutzfahrzeuggesellschaft Arbon & Wetzikon (NAW), but new trolleybuses continued to be badged as FBW into 1984 One of the last truck build by FBW was the FBW Dreiachskipper Type 80-N. Daimler-Benz held a majority stake in the new company, NAW, and production of some types of FBW vehicles was discontinued, being replaced by assembly of Mercedes-Benz multi-axle heavy hauler trucks. The last FBW-badged truck was produced in 1985. However, NAW continued making trolleybuses until 2003.

- 16 Tractors
- 18 Gyrobuses
- 498 Trolleybuses
- 1,012 Trailers
- 1,263 Buses
- 3,878 Trucks

== Trolleybuses ==
Trolleybuses were a significant part of FBW production. Trolleybus production extended from 1932 until 1984. FBW supplied trolleybuses to 12 different Swiss cities, often multiple batches in different periods, and two cities in Czechoslovakia.

Trolleybuses built by FBW are still in operation in several cities in the 2010s, both in Switzerland and in a few other countries where trolleybuses were sold secondhand for continued use after being withdrawn from service in the Swiss cities concerned, such as in Ploieşti, Romania, where ex-Genève FBW vehicles (acquired secondhand in 2006) comprised the majority of the city's trolleybus fleet at the end of 2007, or in Brasov, where former FBW trolleybuses from Bern and Neuchatel operated from about 2006 until 2021.

Three FBW trolleybuses built in 1959–1963 were also still in regular passenger service in 2011 in Valparaíso, Chile, where the privately owned trolleybus system acquired them secondhand from the Zürich transit system in 1991.

== Gallery ==
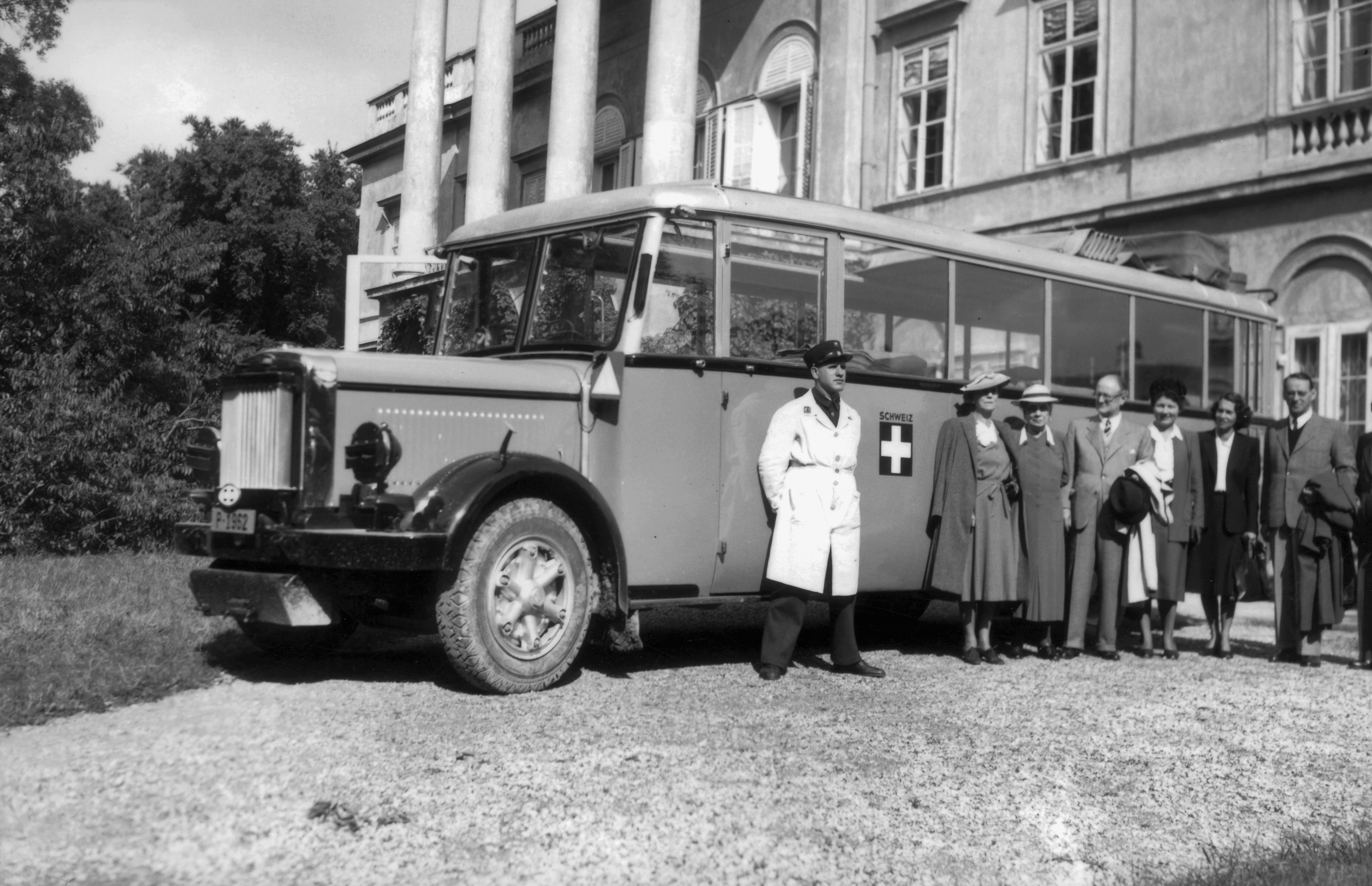
Wood gas-powered bus of Swiss embassy in Budapest, 1944

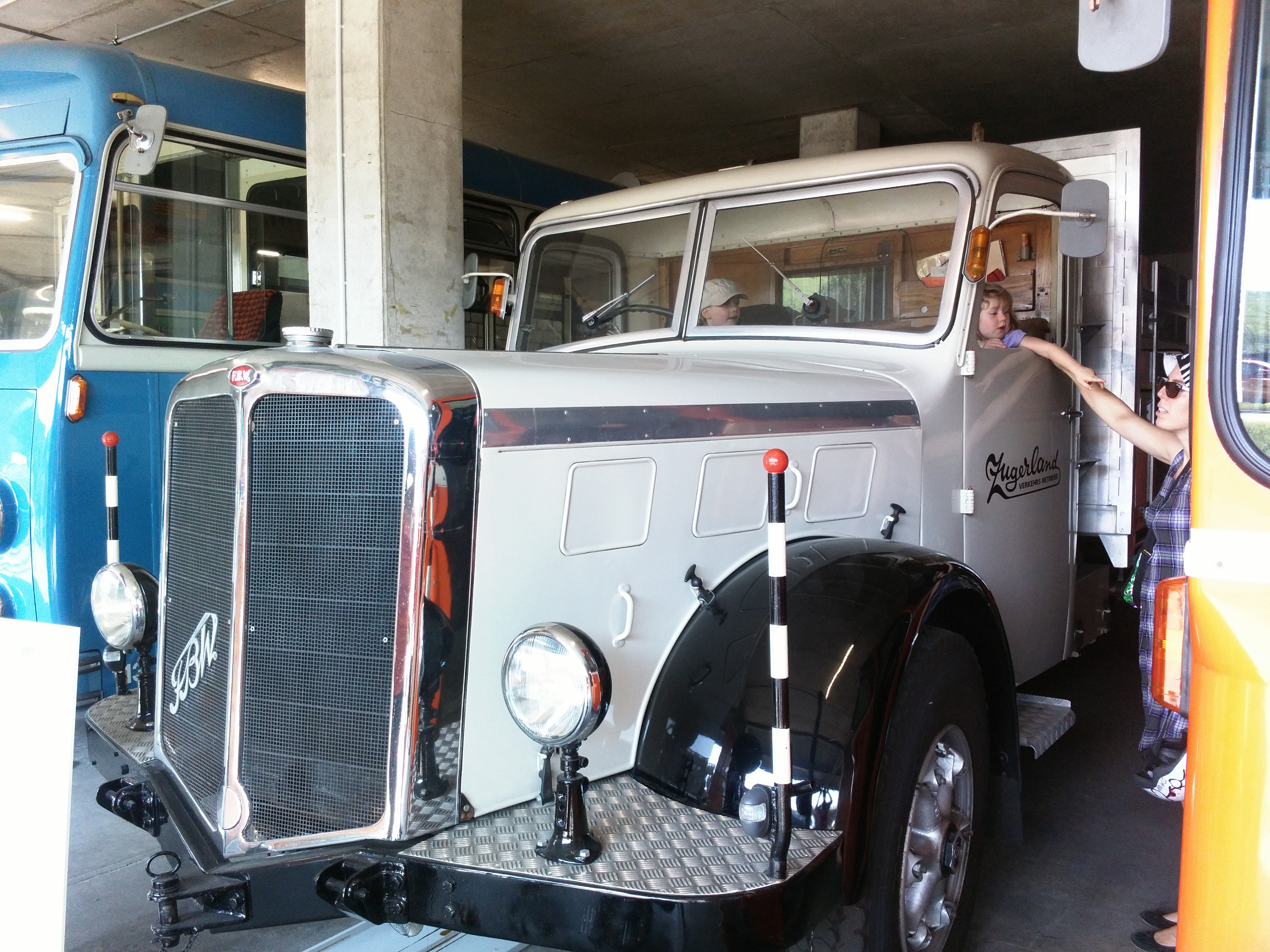
FBW L 50 ED

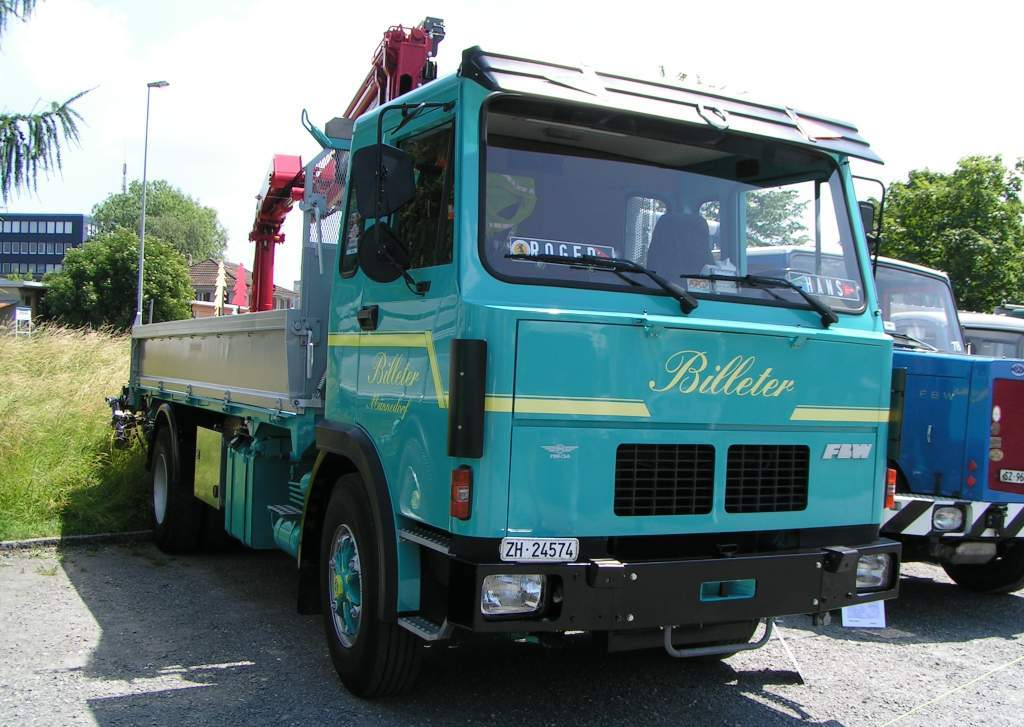
FBW-Frontlenker

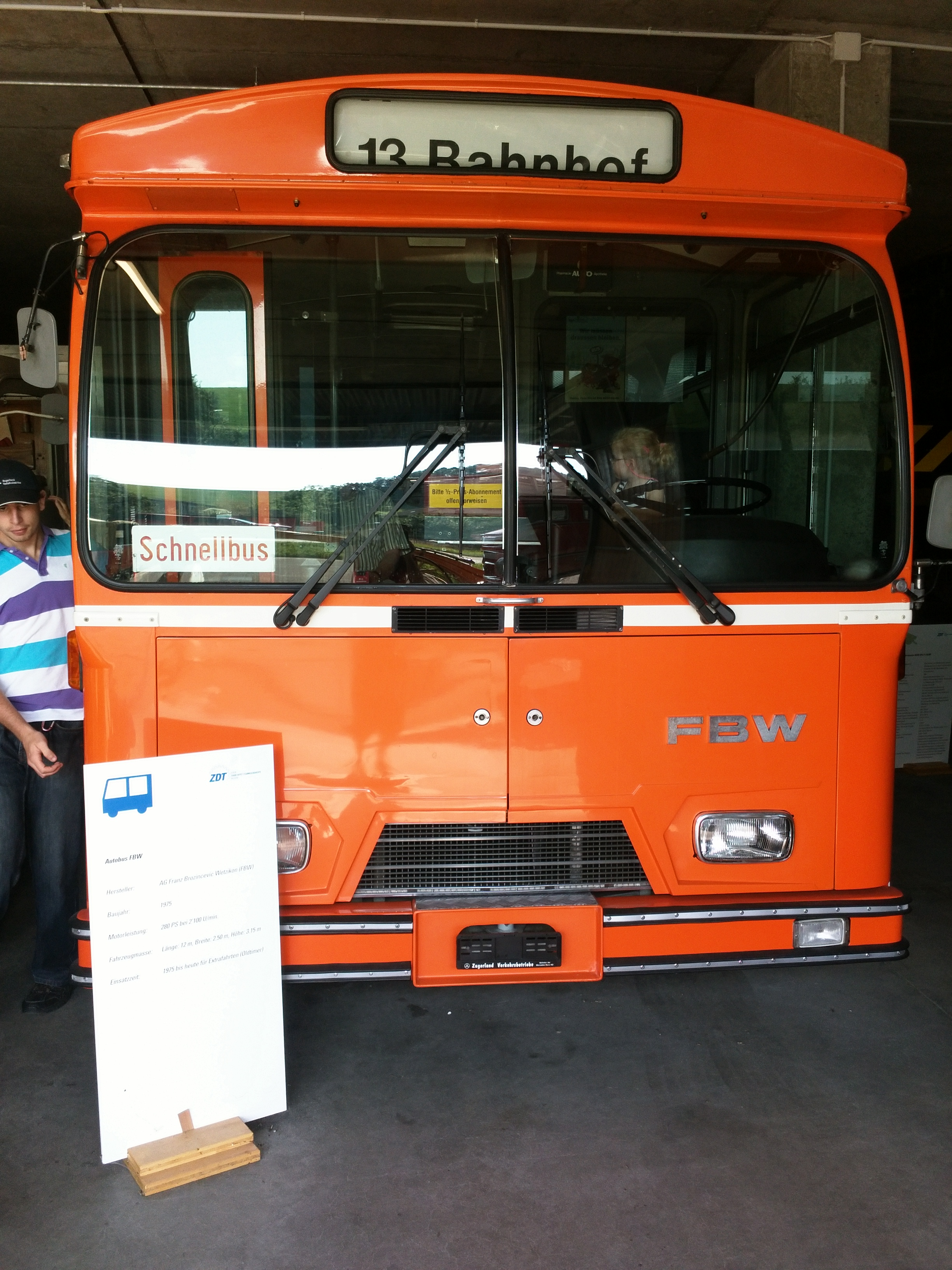
FBW 91U EU4A

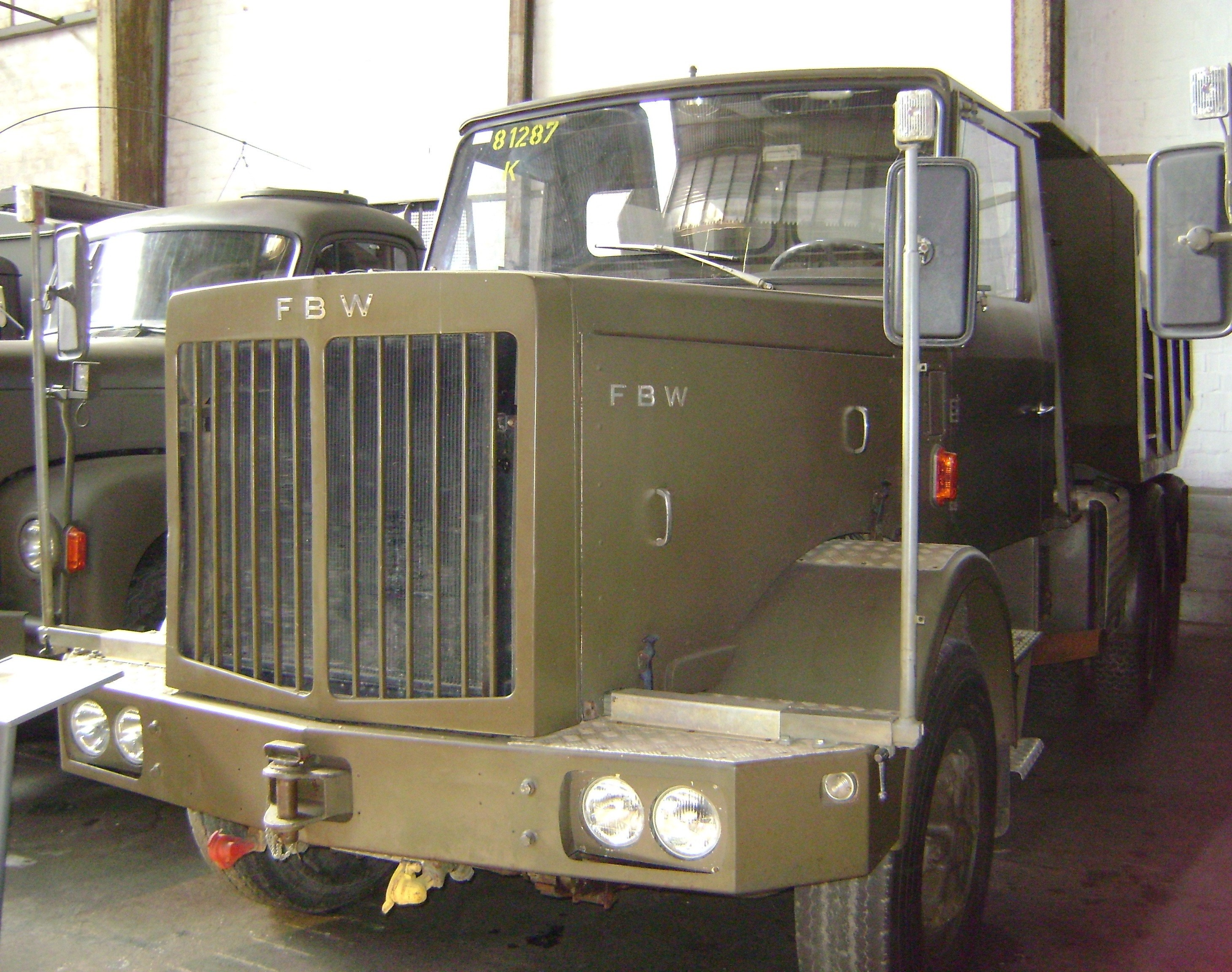
FBW Dreiachskipper Type 80-N

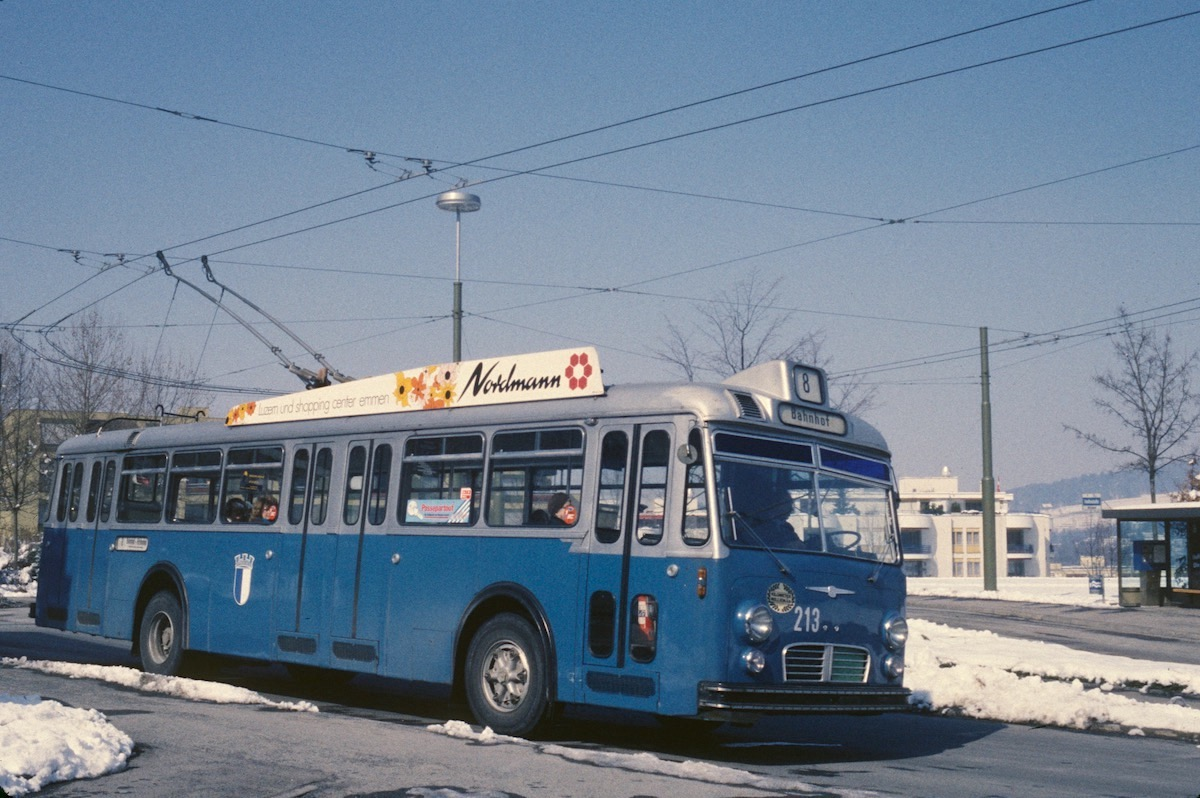
A 1960 FBW trolleybus (with body by Schindler Waggon) in Lucerne in 1987

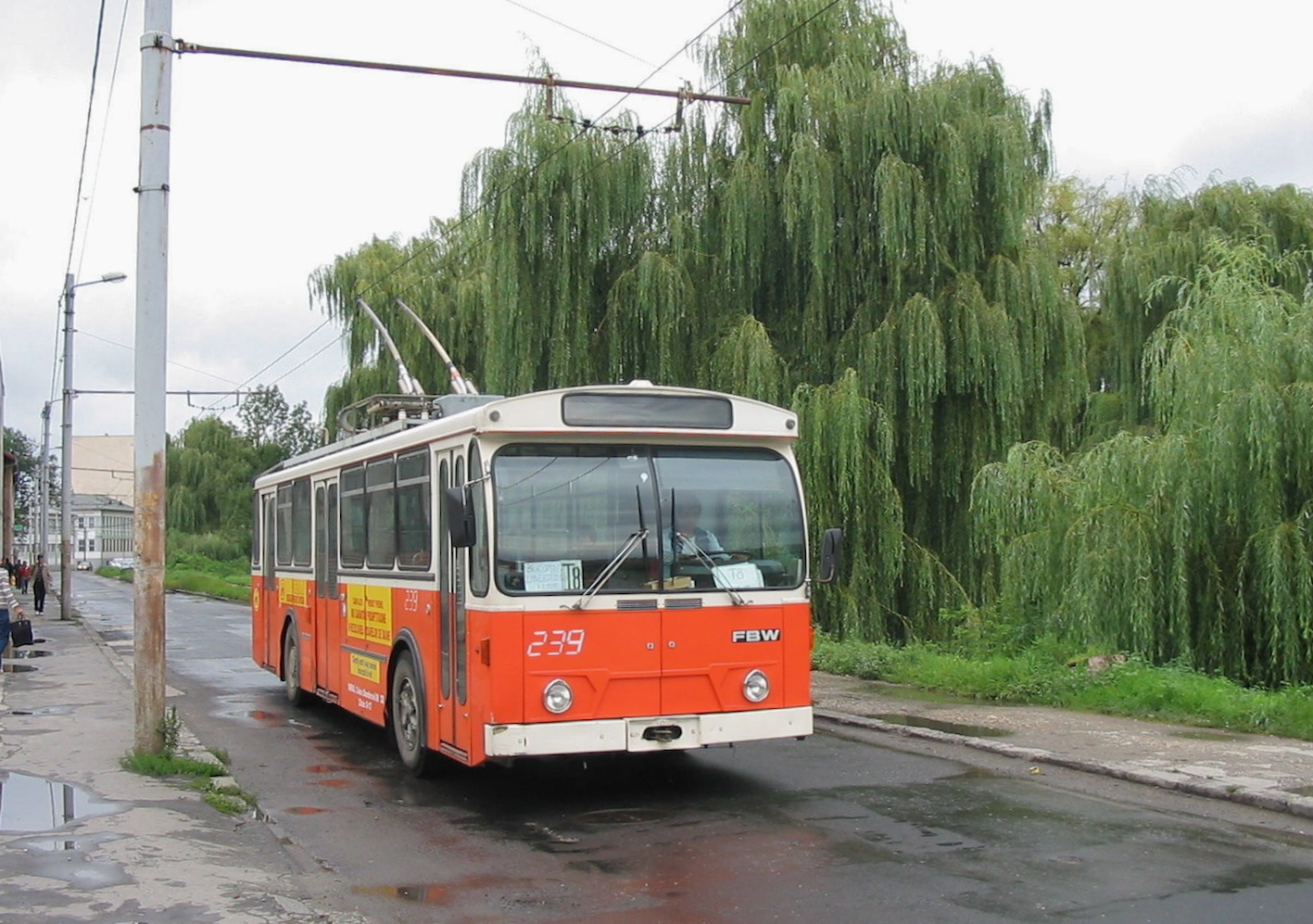
Former Lausanne FBW trolleybus (with Hess body) in Sibiu, Romania, in 2004

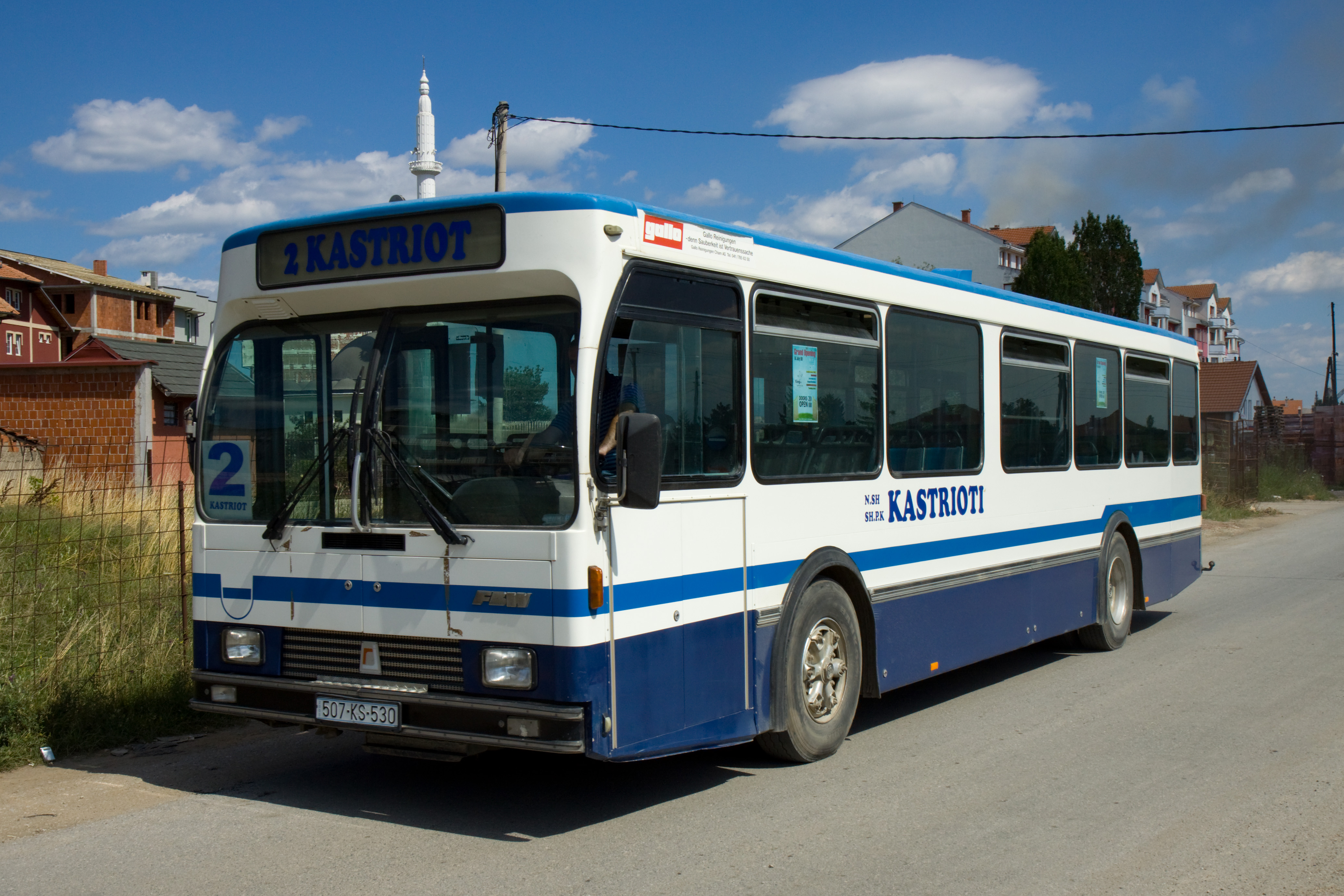
One of the last city buses built by FBW, a FBW Ramseier&Jenzer BNU618-71U EU3AR-1. Seen in the town of Pristina
