= The Apemen =

The Apemen is a Dutch surf rock band, comprising band-members from Tilburg and Rotterdam, with their base remaining in Tilburg.

They have existed since the early 1990s, and has seen several changes in line-up and musical style since their beginning. Their most active period was in the mid-90s when they released all of their records. They are famous for wearing gorilla masks and suits on stage combined with various stage acts, including jumping and moving around on stage, shaking hands with the audience, telling jokes between songs and climbing on top of the bar while playing.

Their first album Are you being surfed? (1994) is strictly guitar-oriented, and includes a mix of songs from their first EP and surf classics like Pipeline and Penetration. The personnel on this record was Joep Verbeek and John Peate on guitar, Jeroen van de Sande on bass, and their first drummer Mike Rosema on drums.

Surfvival of de onbeschofste (1995) saw a change in line-up with Joep Verbeek and John Peate quitting the band, Jeroen van de Sande moving from bass to guitar, and David Andriesse filling in on bass. On this record Albert Benier was added to play organ, and he wrote much of the material for this album. The sound on this record is more organ-based with several songs using that as the lead instrument. El rey del Surf is their only vocal song on Surfvival..., and is a Spanish-language version of Trashmen's King of the Surf.

After Surfvival of de onbeschofste the group has only recorded one song that has been released: 24 hours from Tulsa which was released on the surf-music tribute to Burt Bacharach That's new Pussycat! (OmOm Records, 2000).

Their live-set mainly comprises songs from Surfvival of de onbeschofste with several numbers from Are you... and songs they have written after Surfvival of de onbeschofste, and has seen little change after their prolific period.

On January 6, 2007 they played their farewell concert in Geel, Belgium. Late 2010 they made their comeback on Burlesque Ballroom in Rotterdam.

== Band members ==
- Jeroen van de Sande - guitar
- Johnny Zuidhof - drums
- Albert Benier - organ
- David Andriesse - bass

== Albums ==
- Are you being surfed?, 10" LP/CD, 1994, Vulcan records (Semaphore)
- Surfvivial of de Onbeschofste, 12" LP/CD, 1995, Nitro! (Demolition Derby)
- Live at KFJC(CDR), CD-R, 1999 [Recorded in Los Altos Hills, CA, USA, spring 1994; Promo CD-R live (250 copies released for special fans)]
- Seven Inches of Love, CD, 2000, Double Crown records [The Apemen's complete 7" vinyl releases, compilation album tracks, 1 unreleased track and two live tracks.]

== 7"s ==
- Invasion of the Apemen EP, 7” EP 45 RPM, spring 1993, Kogar records.
- Intoxica (split single w/Monomen), 7” 45 RPM split single, summer 1993, Demolition Derby records.
- Sounds of the Apemen EP, 7” EP 33 RPM, August 1994, Demolition Derby records.
- El Torura/Percolator Stomp, 7” 45 RPM, autumn 1994, Estrus records.

== Appearances on compilations ==
- Estrus Cocktail Companion, 1994
- Surfin Around the World, 1995
- Locked into Surf volume 2, 1995
- Rock music from the Netherlands, 1996
- ANGST! OX! compilation No. 22, 1996
- Locked into Surf Part 1, 1997
- Rockaway Zine (free CDR Sampler), 1999
- That's New Pussycat!, 2000
- Continental Magazine No. 9 Sampler, 2000
- Gremmie's Ghouly Surf Hits, 2001
- Continental Magazine No. 10 Sampler, 2002
- War of the Surf Guitars, 2002
- Diggin for Gold, 2004
- Surf Guitars! Extreme, 2004
- Surf as Art, 2005
