= Annual premium equivalent =

Annual premium equivalent (APE) is a measure used for comparison of life insurance revenue by normalising policy premiums into the equivalent of regular annual payments. This is particularly used when the sales contain both single premium and regular premium business. This is used by the insurance industry to allow comparisons of the amount of new business gained in a period by life insurance companies.

There can be single payment premiums which is actually the sales spread over a period of long time. (In contrast to the recurring premiums which involves payment of premiums every year). So APE is a measure to normalize the single premium payments to the recurring payment premium equivalent. This helps in comparing the sales accurately.

A common approach taken by insurance companies is to take 100% of regular premiums, being the annual premiums received for a policy, and 10% of single premiums. This assumes that an average life insurance policy lasts 10 years and therefore taking 10% of single premiums annualises the single lump sum payment received over the 10-year duration.

== Related categories ==
- Insurance
- PVNBP (Present value of new business premium)
- European embedded value (EEV)
