= Martin County, Texas =

County in Texas, United States

- County
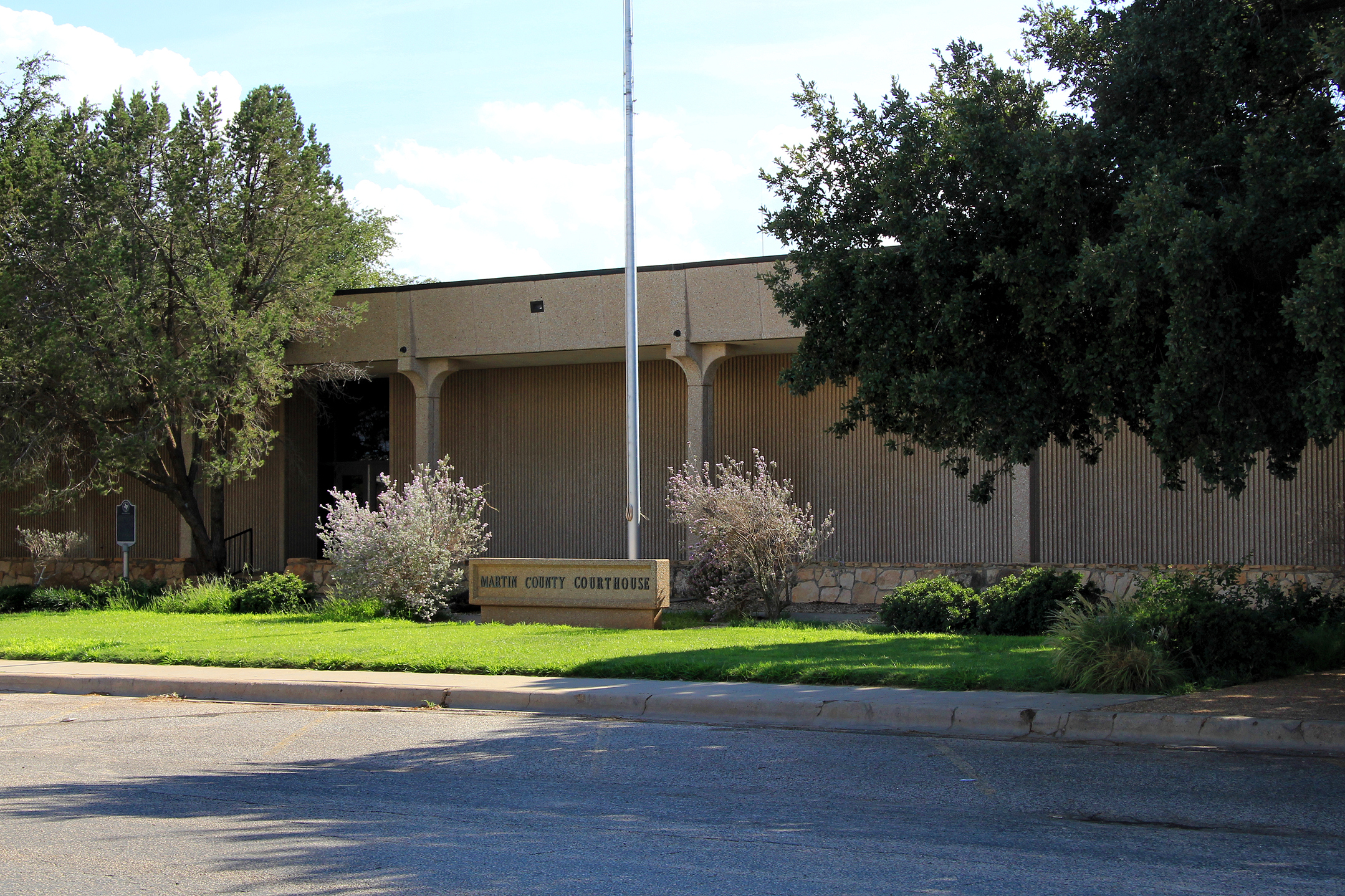
- The Martin County Courthouse in Stanton

- Location within the U.S. state of Texas
- Coordinates: 32°18′N 101°58′W
- Country: United States
- State: Texas
- Founded: 1884
- Named for: Wylie Martin
- Seat: Stanton
- Largest city: Midland

Area
  - Total: 916 sq mi (2,370 km^{2})
  - Land: 915 sq mi (2,370 km^{2})
  - Water: 0.7 sq mi (1.8 km^{2}) 0.08%

Population (2020)
  - Total: 5,237
  - Estimate (2025): 5,284 ▲
  - Density: 5.72/sq mi (2.21/km^{2})
- Time zone: UTC−6 (Central)
  - Summer (DST): UTC−5 (CDT)
- Congressional district: 19th
- Website: www.co.martin.tx.us

Martin County is a county in the U.S. state of Texas. As of the 2020 census, its population was 5,237. Its county seat is Stanton. The county was created in 1876 and organized in 1884. It is named for Wylie Martin, an early settler. Martin County is included in the Midland–Odessa combined statistical area.

== Geography ==
According to the U.S. Census Bureau, the county has an area of 916 square miles (2,370 km^{2}), of which 0.7 square miles (1.8 km^{2}) (0.08%) is covered by water. The northern portion of the Spraberry Trend, the second-largest oil field in the United States by 2013 estimated crude oil production, underlies much of the county.

=== Major highways ===
- I-20
- I-20 BL
- US 87
- SH 115
- SH 137
- SH 176
- SH 349

=== Adjacent counties ===
- Dawson County (north)
- Howard County (east)
- Glasscock County (southeast)
- Midland County (south)
- Andrews County (west)
- Gaines County (northwest)

== Demographics ==
Historical population
Census	Pop.	Note	%±
1880	12		—
1890	264		2,100.0%
1900	332		25.8%
1910	1,549		366.6%
1920	1,146		−26.0%
1930	5,785		404.8%
1940	5,556		−4.0%
1950	5,541		−0.3%
1960	5,068		−8.5%
1970	4,774		−5.8%
1980	4,684		−1.9%
1990	4,956		5.8%
2000	4,746		−4.2%
2010	4,799		1.1%
2020	5,237		9.1%
2025 (est.)	5,284	▲	0.9%
U.S. Decennial Census 1850-2010; 2010 2020

=== Racial and ethnic composition ===
Martin County, Texas – Racial and ethnic composition Note: the US Census treats Hispanic/Latino as an ethnic category. This table excludes Latinos from the racial categories and assigns them to a separate category. Hispanics/Latinos may be of any race.
Race / Ethnicity (NH = Non-Hispanic)	Pop 2000	Pop 2010	Pop 2020	% 2000	% 2010	% 2020
White alone (NH)	2,696	2,578	2,780	56.81%	53.72%	53.08%
Black or African American alone (NH)	74	67	81	1.56%	1.40%	1.55%
Native American or Alaska Native alone (NH)	8	15	22	0.17%	0.31%	0.42%
Asian alone (NH)	8	11	9	0.17%	0.23%	0.17%
Pacific Islander alone (NH)	0	3	1	0.00%	0.06%	0.02%
Other race alone (NH)	0	7	19	0.00%	0.15%	0.36%
Multiracial (NH)	35	32	70	0.74%	0.67%	1.34%
Hispanic or Latino (any race)	1,925	2,086	2,255	40.56%	43.47%	43.06%
Total	4,746	4,799	5,237	100.00%	100.00%	100.00%

=== 2020 census ===
As of the 2020 census, the county had a population of 5,237 and a median age of 35.1 years. 29.4% of residents were under the age of 18 and 13.2% were 65 years of age or older. For every 100 females there were 99.4 males, and for every 100 females age 18 and over there were 97.3 males age 18 and over.

The racial makeup of the county was 68.4% White, 1.7% Black or African American, 1.3% American Indian and Alaska Native, 0.2% Asian, <0.1% Native Hawaiian and Pacific Islander, 13.8% from some other race, and 14.7% from two or more races. Hispanic or Latino residents of any race comprised 43.1% of the population.

<0.1% of residents lived in urban areas, while 100.0% lived in rural areas.

There were 1,846 households in the county, of which 40.9% had children under the age of 18 living in them. Of all households, 58.4% were married-couple households, 16.4% were households with a male householder and no spouse or partner present, and 21.5% were households with a female householder and no spouse or partner present. About 20.0% of all households were made up of individuals and 8.1% had someone living alone who was 65 years of age or older.

There were 2,114 housing units, of which 12.7% were vacant. Among occupied housing units, 74.4% were owner-occupied and 25.6% were renter-occupied. The homeowner vacancy rate was 1.0% and the rental vacancy rate was 12.3%.

=== 2000 census ===
As of the 2000 census, 4,746 people, 1,624 households, and 1,256 families resided in the county. Its population density was 5 people per square mile (1.9 people/km^{2}). The 1,894 housing units had an average density of 2 units per square mile (0.77/km^{2}). The racial makeup of the county was 79.01% White, 1.58% African American, 0.82% Native American, 0.17% Asian, 16.06% from other races, and 2.36% from two or more races; 40.56% of the population were Hispanics or Latinos of any race.

Of the 1,624 households, 42.7% had children under 18 living with them, 64.3% were married couples living together, 9.5% had a female householder with no husband present, and 22.60 were not families. About 21.7% of all households were made up of individuals, and 11.8% had someone living alone who was 65 or older. The average household size was 2.87 and the average family size was 3.36.

In the county, The age distribution was 33.9% under 18, 6.7% from 18 to 24, 26.4% from 25 to 44, 19.7% from 45 to 64, and 13.3% 65 or older. The median age was 32 years. For every 100 females, there were 95.6 males. For every 100 females 18 and over, there were 92.7 males.

The median income for a household in the county was $31,836, and for a family was $35,965. Males had a median income of $29,360 versus $19,063 for females. The per capita income for the county was $15,647. About 14.90% of families and 18.70% of the population were below the poverty line, including 23.90% of those under age 18 and 17.10% of those age 65 or over.

== Media ==
The county is served by a weekly newspaper, local station KKJW (FM), nearby (Lamesa, Texas) stations KBXJ (FM) and KPET (AM), and the various Midland and Odessa radio and TV stations.

== Communities ==
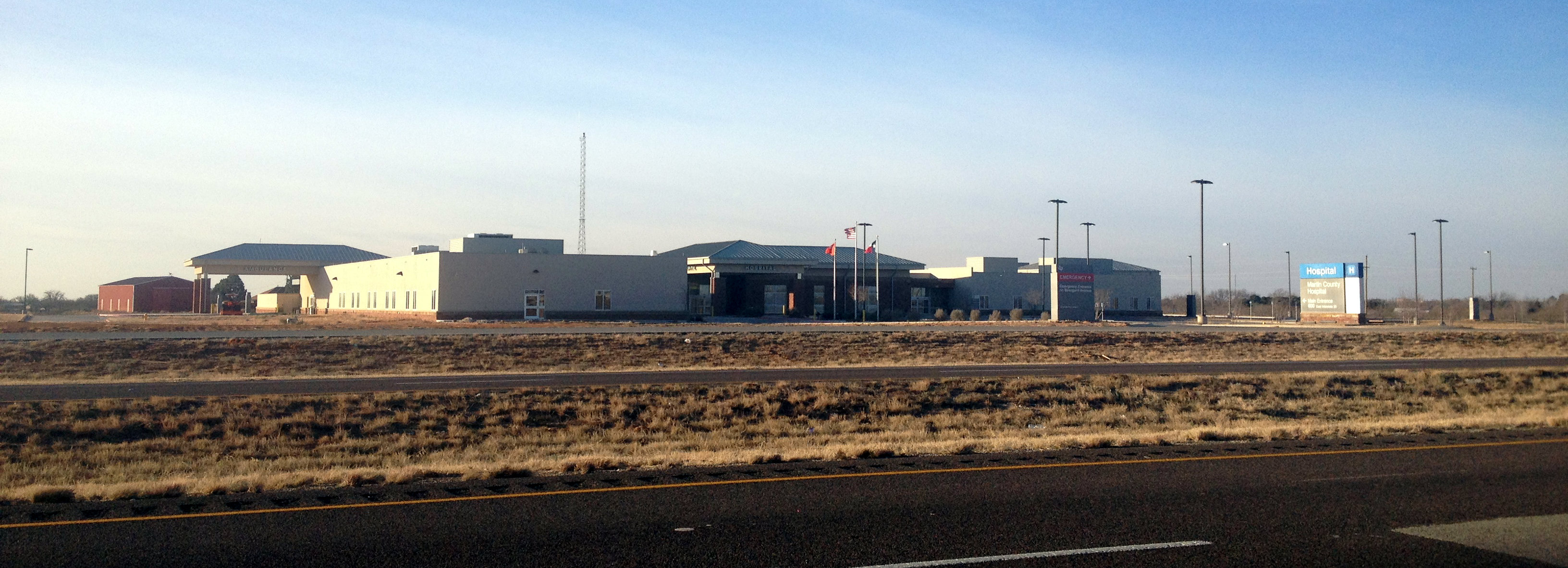
Martin County Hospital, a 20-bed facility, serves the community.

=== Cities ===
- Ackerly (partly in Dawson County)
- Midland (mostly in Midland County)
- Stanton (county seat)

=== Unincorporated communities ===
- Lenorah
- Tarzan

== Government and politics ==
=== Government ===
Martin County, like all counties in Texas, is governed by a commissioners' court, which consists of the county judge (the chairperson of the court), who is elected county-wide, and four commissioners who are elected by the voters in each of four precincts.

The commissioners' court is the policy-making body for the county; in addition, the county judge is the senior executive and administrative position in the county. The court sets the county tax rate, adopts the budget, appoints boards and commissions, approves grants and personnel actions, and oversees the administration of county government. Martin County is one of only a few Texas counties where the county and district clerks have been combined into one position.

Martin County is represented in the United States Congress as part of Texas's 19th congressional district, by Republican Jodey Arrington of Lubbock. Its two senators are Ted Cruz and John Cornyn, both Republicans. At the state level, Martin County is represented in the Texas State Legislature as part of Texas's 82nd House of Representatives district, by Republican Tom R. Craddock, and the Texas Senate, District 31, by Kevin Sparks.

==== County commissioners ====
Office	Name	Party
County Judge	Bryan Cox	Republican
Commissioner, Precinct 1	Kenny Stewart	Republican
Commissioner, Precinct 2	Auggie Ramos	Republican
Commissioner, Precinct 3	Brian Snellgrove	Republican
Commissioner, Precinct 4	Koy Blocker	Republican

==== County officials ====
Office	Name	Party
District/county attorney	James Napper	Republican
County/District Clerk	Linda Gonzalez	Republican
Sheriff	Randy Cozart	Republican
Tax assessor-collector	Lori Pardue	Republican
Treasurer	Cynthia O'Donnell	Republican

=== Politics ===
Martin County, like most other Southern counties, was once deeply Democratic. It continuously gave over 70% of the vote to the Democratic candidate, and only voted twice for Republicans (both during national landslides) between statehood and 1980, after which it swung sharply to the right. Since then, it has followed the rest of West Texas in becoming one of the most loyally Republican areas in the state and has only swung further towards Republicans in the 21st century due to the rapidly liberalizing social policies of the Democratic Party, as well as concerns over Democratic climate policy, which is considered unattractive by West Texans due to their predominantly fossil fuel production-based economy. In 2024, Republican Donald Trump received 87.6% of the vote, the best a Republican has ever received in the county.

Until November 2018, Martin County was one of six remaining entirely dry counties in Texas. During that month, Martin County changed from a dry county to a partially wet county after Stanton residents voted to approve the sale of beer and wine within city limits. Five dry counties remain.

United States presidential election results for Martin County, Texas
Year	Republican		Democratic		Third party(ies)	
Year	No.	%	No.	%	No.	%
1912	9	14.52%	50	80.65%	3	4.84%
1916	14	8.70%	125	77.64%	22	13.66%
1920	33	18.86%	136	77.71%	6	3.43%
1924	92	21.60%	327	76.76%	7	1.64%
1928	330	60.77%	213	39.23%	0	0.00%
1932	44	5.91%	694	93.28%	6	0.81%
1936	70	8.20%	775	90.75%	9	1.05%
1940	136	11.52%	1,044	88.40%	1	0.08%
1944	131	13.29%	758	76.88%	97	9.84%
1948	77	7.15%	945	87.74%	55	5.11%
1952	562	37.07%	952	62.80%	2	0.13%
1956	318	25.92%	903	73.59%	6	0.49%
1960	350	29.09%	831	69.08%	22	1.83%
1964	402	30.99%	892	68.77%	3	0.23%
1968	343	27.33%	373	29.72%	539	42.95%
1972	935	75.22%	287	23.09%	21	1.69%
1976	698	43.14%	907	56.06%	13	0.80%
1980	1,093	63.69%	605	35.26%	18	1.05%
1984	1,218	70.00%	512	29.43%	10	0.57%
1988	1,017	61.60%	632	38.28%	2	0.12%
1992	986	49.60%	641	32.24%	361	18.16%
1996	973	54.88%	643	36.27%	157	8.86%
2000	1,520	77.99%	415	21.29%	14	0.72%
2004	1,514	83.79%	288	15.94%	5	0.28%
2008	1,389	80.99%	314	18.31%	12	0.70%
2012	1,368	84.24%	248	15.27%	8	0.49%
2016	1,455	82.58%	266	15.10%	41	2.33%
2020	1,857	85.97%	288	13.33%	15	0.69%
2024	1,825	87.61%	247	11.86%	11	0.53%

United States Senate election results for Martin County, Texas1
Year	Republican		Democratic		Third party(ies)	
Year	No.	%	No.	%	No.	%
2024	1,756	84.95%	264	12.77%	47	2.27%

United States Senate election results for Martin County, Texas2
Year	Republican		Democratic		Third party(ies)	
Year	No.	%	No.	%	No.	%
2020	1,811	85.75%	263	12.45%	38	1.80%

Texas Gubernatorial election results for Martin County
Year	Republican		Democratic		Third party(ies)	
Year	No.	%	No.	%	No.	%
2022	1,341	88.93%	149	9.88%	18	1.19%

== Education ==
School districts include:

- Grady Independent School District
- Klondike Independent School District
- Sands Consolidated Independent School District
- Stanton Independent School District

All of Martin County is in the service area of Howard County Junior College District.

== See also ==
- National Register of Historic Places listings in Martin County, Texas
- Recorded Texas Historic Landmarks in Martin County
