= Stanton, Texas =

- City
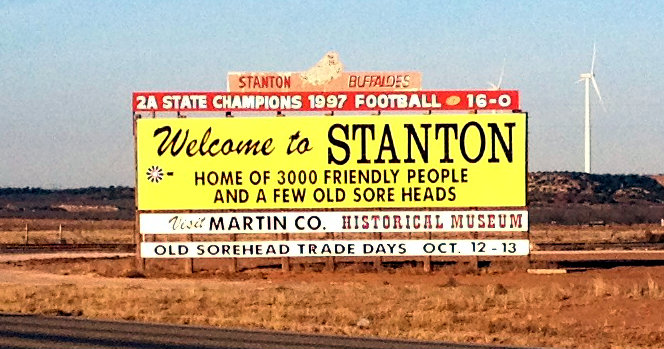
- Welcome to Stanton sign on I-20

- Location of Stanton, Texas
- Coordinates: 32°7′51″N 101°47′31″W
- Country: United States
- State: Texas
- County: Martin

Area
  - Total: 1.99 sq mi (5.16 km^{2})
  - Land: 1.98 sq mi (5.14 km^{2})
  - Water: 0.0077 sq mi (0.02 km^{2})
- Elevation: 2,664 ft (812 m)

Population (2020)
  - Total: 2,657
  - Density: 1,338.5/sq mi (516.81/km^{2})
- Time zone: UTC-6 (Central (CST))
  - Summer (DST): UTC-5 (CDT)
- ZIP code: 79782
- Area code: 432
- FIPS code: 48-70040
- GNIS feature ID: 1347803
- Website: www.cityofstantontx.com

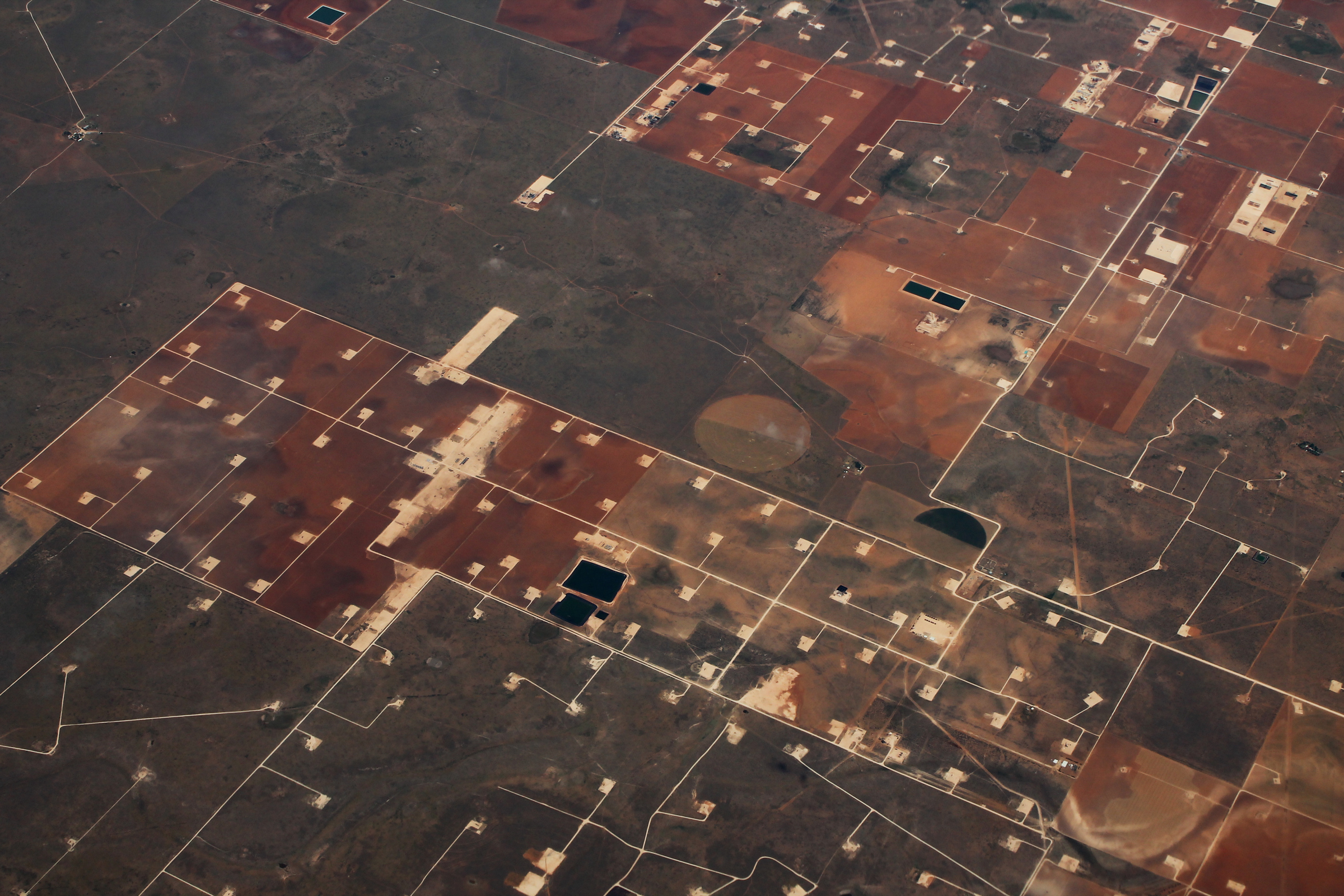
Oil wells near Stanton

Stanton is a city in and the county seat of Martin County, Texas, United States. Stanton was founded as Marienfeld by German immigrants who were some of the first settlers in this region of Texas. Its population was 2,657 at the 2020 census.

== History ==
In 1887, New York native John Scharbauer established a cattle ranch near what later became known as Stanton.

== Geography ==
Stanton is located at 32°7′51″N 101°47′31″W (32.130740, –101.792072).

According to the United States Census Bureau, the city has a total area of 1.8 square miles (4.7 km^{2}), of which 0.56% is covered by water.

== Demographics ==
Historical population
Census	Pop.	Note	%±
1930	1,384		—
1940	1,245		−10.0%
1950	1,603		28.8%
1960	2,228		39.0%
1970	2,117		−5.0%
1980	2,314		9.3%
1990	2,576		11.3%
2000	2,556		−0.8%
2010	2,492		−2.5%
2020	2,657		6.6%
U.S. Decennial Census

=== 2020 census ===
As of the 2020 census, Stanton had a population of 2,657. The median age was 34.4 years, with 29.2% of residents under the age of 18 and 14.2% 65 or older. For every 100 females there were 92.8 males, and for every 100 females age 18 and over there were 88.3 males age 18 and over.

0.0% of residents lived in urban areas, while 100.0% lived in rural areas.

There were 970 households in Stanton, of which 39.7% had children under the age of 18 living in them. Of all households, 48.6% were married-couple households, 17.5% were households with a male householder and no spouse or partner present, and 29.2% were households with a female householder and no spouse or partner present. About 25.0% of all households were made up of individuals and 10.6% had someone living alone who was 65 years of age or older.

There were 1,108 housing units, of which 12.5% were vacant. The homeowner vacancy rate was 1.5% and the rental vacancy rate was 14.2%.

Racial composition as of the 2020 census
Race	Number	Percent
White	1,640	61.7%
Black or African American	70	2.6%
American Indian and Alaska Native	55	2.1%
Asian	6	0.2%
Native Hawaiian and Other Pacific Islander	1	0.0%
Some other race	471	17.7%
Two or more races	414	15.6%
Hispanic or Latino (of any race)	1,435	54.0%

=== 2000 census ===
As of the 2000 census 2,556 people, 854 households, and 651 families lived in the city. The population density was 1,458.1 inhabitants per square mile (563.0/km^{2}). The 1,002 housing units had an average density of 571.6 per square mile (220.7/km^{2}). The racial makeup of the city was 73.98% White, 2.86% African American, 0.74% Native American, 0.31% Asian, 19.56% from other races, and 2.54% from two or more races. Hispanics or Latinos of any race were 52.90% of the population.

Of the 854 households, 44.8% had children under 18 living with them, 59.0% were married couples living together, 13.7% had a female householder with no husband present, and 23.7% were not families. About 22.7% of all households were made up of individuals, and 13.0% had someone living alone who was 65 or older. The average household size was 2.92 and the average family size was 3.44.

In the city, the age distribution was 35.0% under 18, 7.9% from 18 to 24, 26.0% from 25 to 44, 16.7% from 45 to 64, and 14.4% who were 65 or older. The median age was 30 years. For every 100 females, there were 87.4 males. For every 100 females 18 and over, there were 84.9 males.

The median income for a household in the city was $27,961, and for a family was $32,768. Males had a median income of $27,647 versus $18,333 for females. The per capita income for the city was $13,634. About 19.7% of families and 22.0% of the population were below the poverty line, including 26.0% of those under 18 and 22.0% of those 65 or over.

== Education ==
Residents are in the Stanton Independent School District.

== Notable people ==
- Craig Eiland, Texas state representative from Galveston, was born in Stanton in 1962.
- Michael Salgado, Tejano singer, was born in Stanton in 1971.
