= APE 4.80 =

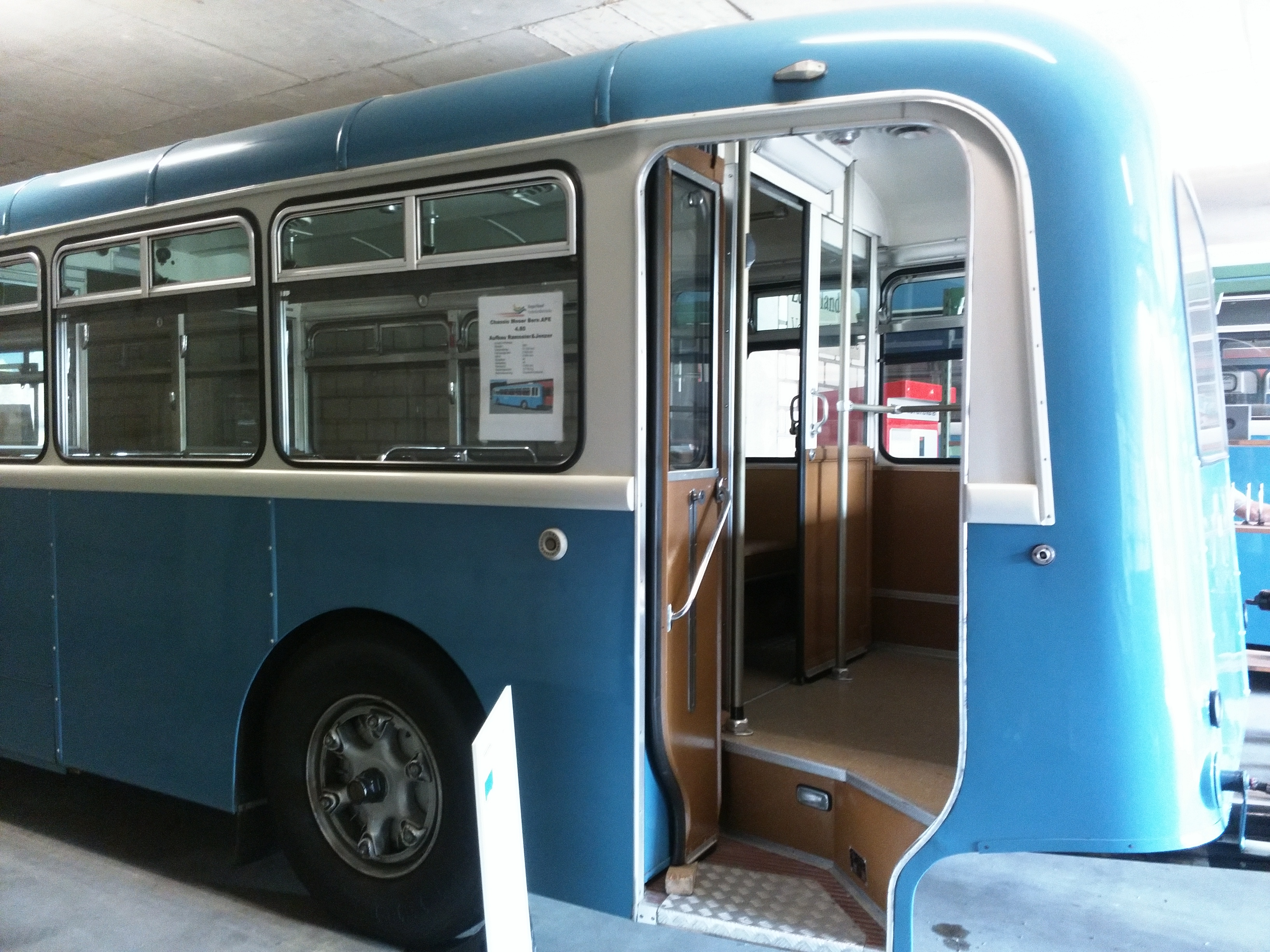
passenger trailer APE 4.80

The APE 4.80 is a passenger trailer wagon and was built by the Swiss manufacturer Gebrüder Moser + Cie and Ramseier & Jenzer + Cie, both in Bern, for the Zugerland Verkehrsbetriebe (ZVB).

== History and development ==
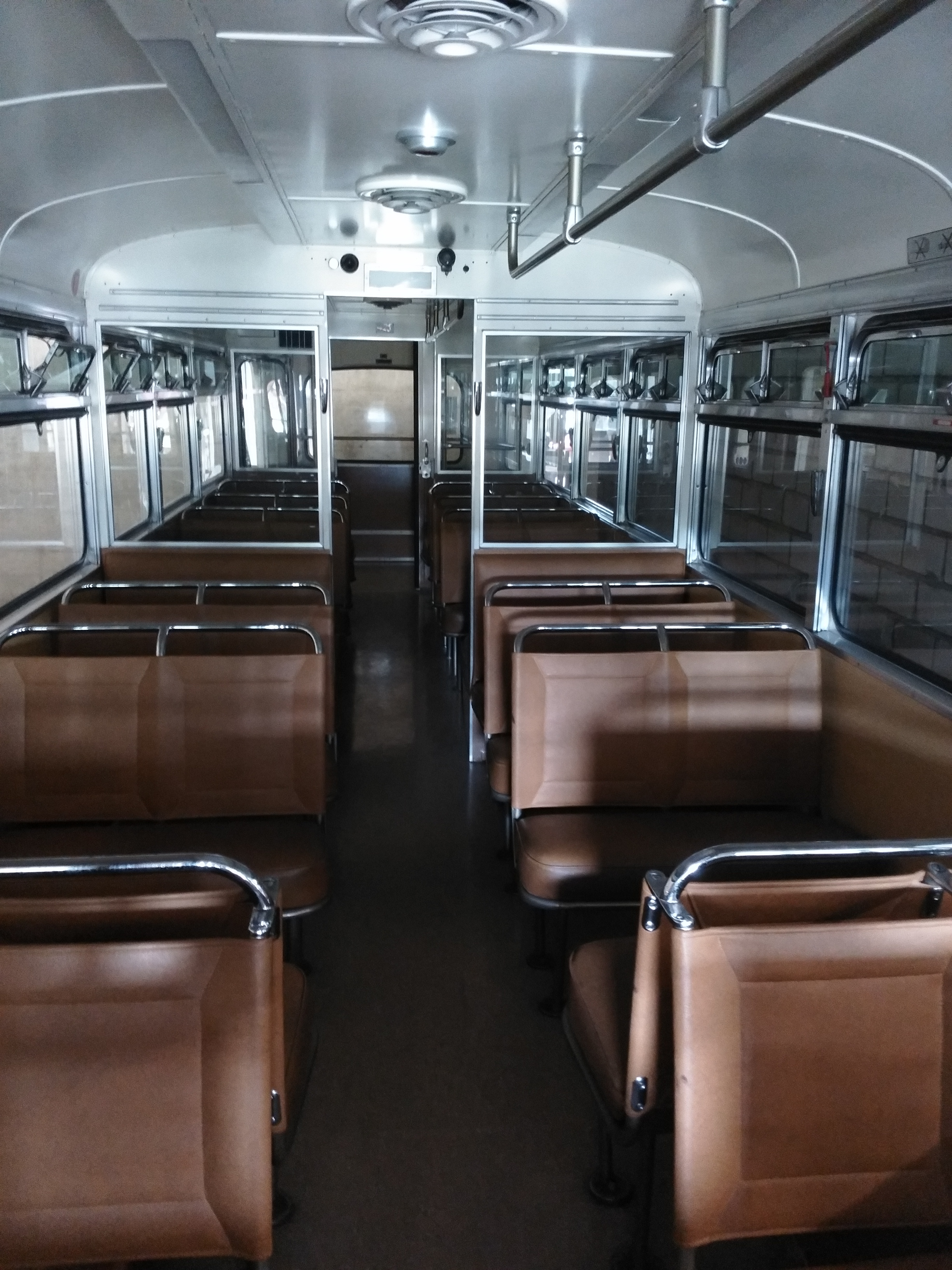
passenger compartment

Construction of the first wagons started in 1961, with Ramseier & Jenzer + Cie handling the manufacturing. In 1963, ZVB had more than ten APE 4.80 passenger trailers.

In the Zugerland transport companies ZVB (German: Zugerland Verkehrsbetrieben), the APE 4.80 were mainly used on the mountain lines Zug-Ägeri (line 1) and Zug-Menzingen (line 2) with Saurer 5 DUK buses. This first batch of APE 4.80 passenger trailers had the same blue color as the Saurer DUK 5 busses.

Around 1975/76, together with the orange-colored FBW buses (manufacturer designation FBW 91U EU4A), eight new trailers were also produced and delivered in orange color.

All APE 4.80 units have a trailer coupling, which can be used to mount single-axle or two-axle luggage trailers AGP 3, and were designed in such a way that the entrance room at the rear also functioned as a luggage compartment, separated from the passenger compartment by sliding doors. In the first tranche, the passenger compartment was also divided into a smoking and non-smoking section by means of an intermediate wall with a door; in the second tranche, the last eight APE 4.80, they were designed with both as a non-smoking compartment. Both compartments were equipped with light brown leather seats. APE 4.80 number 28 (ex. Number 3) of the ZVB is located in the Zug depot technology history (German: Zuger Depot Technikgeschichte).

== Technical specifications ==
- Total length 10,700 mm (35 ft 1 1/4 in)
- Vehicle width 2,500 mm (8 ft 2 3/8 in)
- Height 3,054 mm (10 ft 1/4 in)
- Seating capacity 40
- Standing places 40
- Wheelbase 5,900 mm (19 ft 4 1/4 in)
- Total weight 12,700 kg (28,000 lb)
- Brake control Compressed air, hydraulics
