= APE Foundation =

Thai nongovernmental organization

Association for Protection of the Environment
- Founder: Saroch Deschusson; Dr. Narumol Plodtong; Oliver Price; Sarah Hopson
- Type: Charitable foundation
- Purpose: Environmentalism
- Location: Khlong Thom District, Krabi Province, Thailand
- Region served: Khao Nor Chuchi tropical lowland forest situated in Khoa Pra-Bang Khram National Reserve Forest and Khao Pra-Brag Khram Wildlife Sanctuary
- Method: Community work, research, education
- Website: http://a-p-e.org

The Association for Protection of the Environment (APE) is a non-governmental organization working on issues regarding the conservation, and restoration of the environment, education about permaculture and agroforestry among other things.

The group says its mission is "to protect the existing forest and wildlife, particularly in Khao Nor Chuchi Lowland Forest and to increase biodiversity in the area". Among other issues, it is also concerned with endangered species, deforestation and climate change.

== History ==
APE was started in 2010 by a Thai and British group of conservation workers and volunteers who come from biology, forestry, design and teaching backgrounds. APE was born of their shared urge to prevent deforestation of the few remaining areas of primary forest, restore land cleared areas and protect wildlife in Thailand.

== Project area ==
APE is working in Khao Nor Chu Chi tropical lowland forest situated in Khoa Pra-Bang Khram National Reserve Forest and Khao Pra-Brag Khram Wildlife Sanctuary. Krabi Province has the last remaining areas of topical lowland forest in Thailand; these diverse areas are home to several endangered and threatened species such as bearcat, rufous-collared kingfisher and Gurney's pitta.

== Volunteer projects ==
Participants projects including teaching in schools, basic construction, planting trees, seed collections and community work.

== Current conservation approach ==
=== Goals ===
- Protect the existing forest and wildlife through education and research projects.
- Encourage planting of native tree and plant species to increase biodiversity in the area.
- Restore existing forest with help from groups like FORRU, OBC, RSPB and BCST.
- Support and co-ordinate existing local conservation efforts.

These goals will be achieved through education with school-aged children and locals, providing information and bridging the gap between research and community on issues relating to forest & wildlife habitat restoration, native plant and animal species, environmental protection, agroforestry and low impact farming methods, setting up sustainable incomes for local conservation projects and, if required, bringing together various organizations, local and global.

APE works with a large number of different groups to achieve its goals, including other Non-governmental organization, government agencies, business, farmers and local communities. It also seeks to educate people on how to live in a more environmentally friendly manner. APE runs workshops for locals by experts in sustainable farming methods such as agroforestry or permaculture.

== Work with governments ==
APE currently works with the government Forest Protection Unit in Krabi, FORRU Plant Station Krabi and FORRU's forest restoration program in Chiang Mai.
