= Tazeh Ran =

Tazeh Ran تازه ران
- Village
- Location within Iran
- Coordinates: 33°31′28″N 49°35′02″E
- Country: Iran
- Province: Lorestan
- County: Azna
- Bakhsh: Japelaq
- Rural District: Japelaq-e Sharqi

Population (2006)
  - Total: 207
- Time zone: UTC+3:30 (IRST)
  - Summer (DST): UTC+4:30 (IRDT)

Tazeh Ran (Persian: تازه ران, also Romanized as Tāzeh Rān, Tāzehrān, and Tāzīrān; also known as Tārzan) is a village in Japelaq-e Sharqi Rural District, Japelaq District, Azna County, Lorestan Province, Iran. At the 2006 census, its population was 207, in 55 families.
