= Ape Canyon =

Gorge in Washington, United States

Coordinates: 46°12′05″N 122°06′24″W

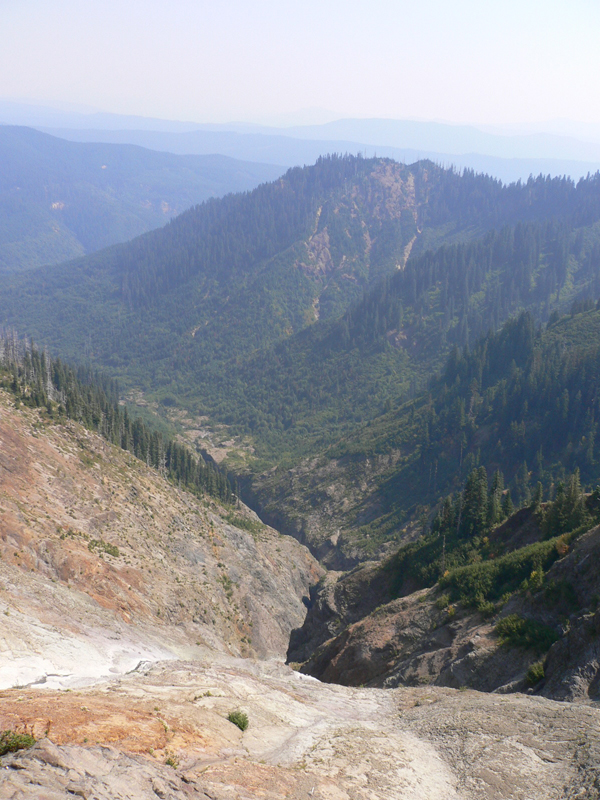
- Ape Canyon in 2006

Geology
- Type: Gorge

Geography
- Location: Mount St. Helens, Washington, U.S.
- Interactive map of Ape Canyon

Ape Canyon is a gorge along the edge of the Plains of Abraham, on the southeast shoulder of Mount St. Helens in the U.S. state of Washington. The gorge narrows to as close as eight feet (2.4 m) at one point. The name alludes to a legend about a 1924 encounter with "apemen" which was later incorporated into Bigfoot folklore. Ape Canyon was heavily impacted by the 1980 eruption of Mount St. Helens. Adjacent to the steep rocky canyon is the present Ape Canyon trail, popular with hikers and mountain bikers. On the south side of the mountain is another feature named Ape Cave.

== Legend ==
In the summer of 1924, a group of gold prospectors claimed that 7 foot (2.1 m) tall ape-like animals attacked them with boulders. According to their tale, they came across the animals in the wilderness, and when one of the group fired a rifle at one of the animals, he struck it three times, and saw the wounded animal topple off a cliff into an inaccessible canyon. The ape men supposedly returned later to bombard their cabin with large stones and leave giant footprints. The story caused a local sensation, prompting U.S. Forest Service rangers J.H. Huffman and William Welch to investigate. Huffman and Welch descended into the supposedly "inaccessible canyon" but found nothing. They demonstrated how 14 inches (36 cm) long footprints found near the cabin could easily be faked, and concluded the miners probably placed large stones near the cabin themselves to bolster their tale. Despite the story being debunked by the rangers, "people still wanted to believe", and the prospectors' story was repeated and continued to spread in later years, inspiring new theories and claims of new sightings.
