= M. Hall Stanton Public School =

School building in Philadelphia

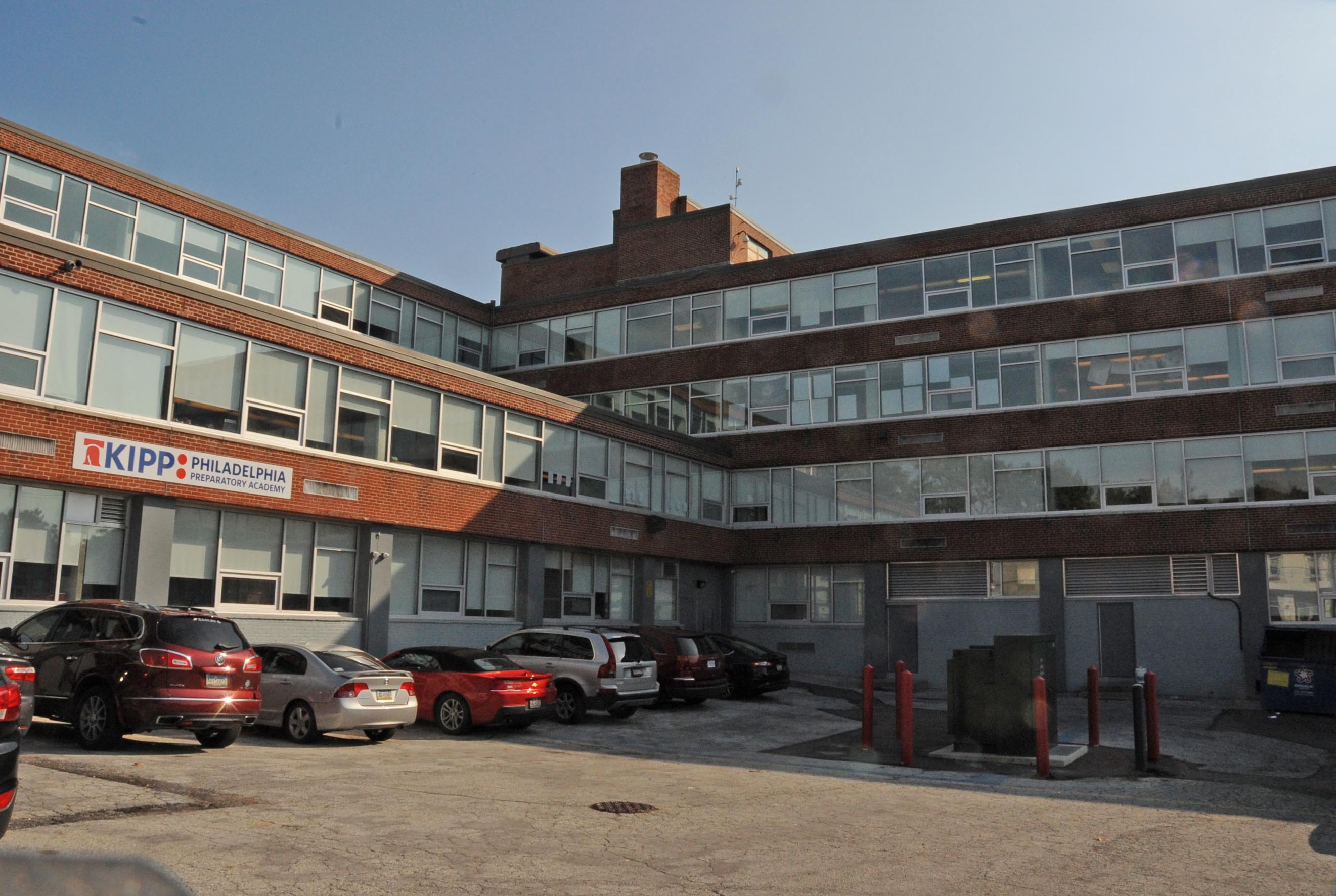
The former building

M. Hall Stanton Public School is a school building in North Philadelphia.

The school building was constructed in 1957. It formerly functioned as a K-8 school operated by the School District of Philadelphia; the school began operations in the 1800s in a different building. The building was listed on the National Register of Historic Places on September 25, 2018.

Stanton K-8 closed in 2013 due to the number of students being too low. KIPP later opened school facilities in the former building.
