= Grady Independent School District =

School district in Texas

Address
- 3011 State Highway 176 Lenorah, Texas, 79749; United States
- Coordinates: 32.293°N 101.843°W

District information
- Type: Public
- Grades: PK–12
- Schools: 1
- NCES District ID: 4821300

Students and staff
- Students: 241 (2024–2025)
- Teachers: 19.78 (on an FTE basis) (2024–2025)
- Staff: 26.77 (on an FTE basis) (2024–2025)
- Student–teacher ratio: 12.18 (2024–2025)

Grady Independent School District is a public school district based in the community of Lenorah, Texas (USA). In addition to Lenorah, the district also serves the community of Tarzan. Grady ISD has one school that serves students in grades kindergarten through twelve.

In 2009, the school district was rated "exemplary" by the Texas Education Agency.

== Special programs ==
=== Athletics ===
Grady High School plays six-man football.
