= Tarzan (nickname) =

The nickname Tarzan may refer to:

- Al-Nour Al-Jilani (born 1944), Sudanese singer
- Enrico Annoni (born 1966), Italian retired footballer
- Tom Beer (born 1944), American former National Football League player
- David Ben-Uziel (born 1935), Israeli Mossad agent and lieutenant colonel
- Migueli (born Miguel Bernardo Bianquetti in 1951), Spanish retired footballer
- Gilles Bilodeau (1955–2008), Canadian ice hockey player, mainly in the World Hockey Association
- Don Bragg (pole vaulter) (1935–2019), American retired pole vaulter
- Ellison Brown (1914–1975), Narragansett Indian runner
- Younus Changezi (born 1944), Pakistani politician
- Tarzan Cooper (1907–1980), African-American basketball player
- Cyrille Delannoit (1926–1998), European middleweight boxing champion in 1948
- John F. Druze (1914–2005), American football player and college football coach
- Bobby Estalella (outfielder) (1911–1991), Major League Baseball player
- Ludwig Fainberg (born 1958), Ukrainian mobster
- Brendon Gale (born 1968), Australian rules football sports administrator and former player
- Eric Glass (1910–1985), Australian rules footballer
- Michael Heseltine (born 1933), Welsh-British politician and businessman
- Carl Holtz (1920–2006), American rower
- Joe Kendall (1909–1965), African-American member of the College Football Hall of Fame
- Mohamed Nur, Somali politician, mayor of Mogadishu (2010–2014)
- Roberto Olivo (1914–2005), Venezuelan baseball umpire
- David "Tarzan" Ritchie (born 1945), Scottish former shinty player
- Antonio Roma (1932–2013), Argentine football goalkeeper
- Hector Tarrazona (born 1944), former Philippine Air Force colonel and a founding member of the Reform the Armed Forces Movement
- Tarzan Taylor (1895–1971), American football player
- David Tyrrell (rugby league) (born 1988), Australian rugby league player
- Joe Wallis (born 1952), American retired Major League Baseball player
- Art White (1915–1996), American National Football League player
- Tarzan Woltzen (1905–1995), American professional basketball player
- Tarzan Yamada (born 1962), Japanese race car driver
- Tarzzan (born 2002), South Korean artist, member of the K-pop group AllDay Project.

== See also ==
- Laurent Dauthuille (1924-1971), French boxer nicknamed the "Tarzan of Buzenval"
- Earl Durand (1913–1939), American poacher, jail escapee and killer nicknamed the "Tarzan of the Tetons"
- Mike Massey (born 1947), American pocket billiards player and trick-shot artist nicknamed "Tennessee Tarzan"
