= Stanton Independent School District =

American public school district

Coordinates: 32°7′40″N 101°47′48″W

Location
- Stanton, Texas; United States

District information
- Superintendent: Dr. Merl Brandon
- Deputy superintendent(s): Jan McCown
- Schools: 3

Students and staff
- Students: 1,102 as of 2017–18
- Teachers: 77 as of 2017–18
- Student–teacher ratio: 13:1 as of 2017–18

Stanton Independent School District is a public school district based in Stanton, Texas, (USA).

Located in Martin County, a portion of the district extends into Howard County.

The Martin County portion includes a section of Midland.

In 2009, the school district was rated "academically acceptable" by the Texas Education Agency.
