= Midland–Odessa =

Metropolitan area in West Texas

Midland–Odessa, Texas Midland–Odessa–Andrews, Texas combined statistical area
- Combined Statistical Area
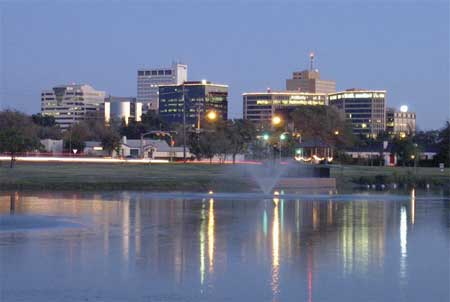
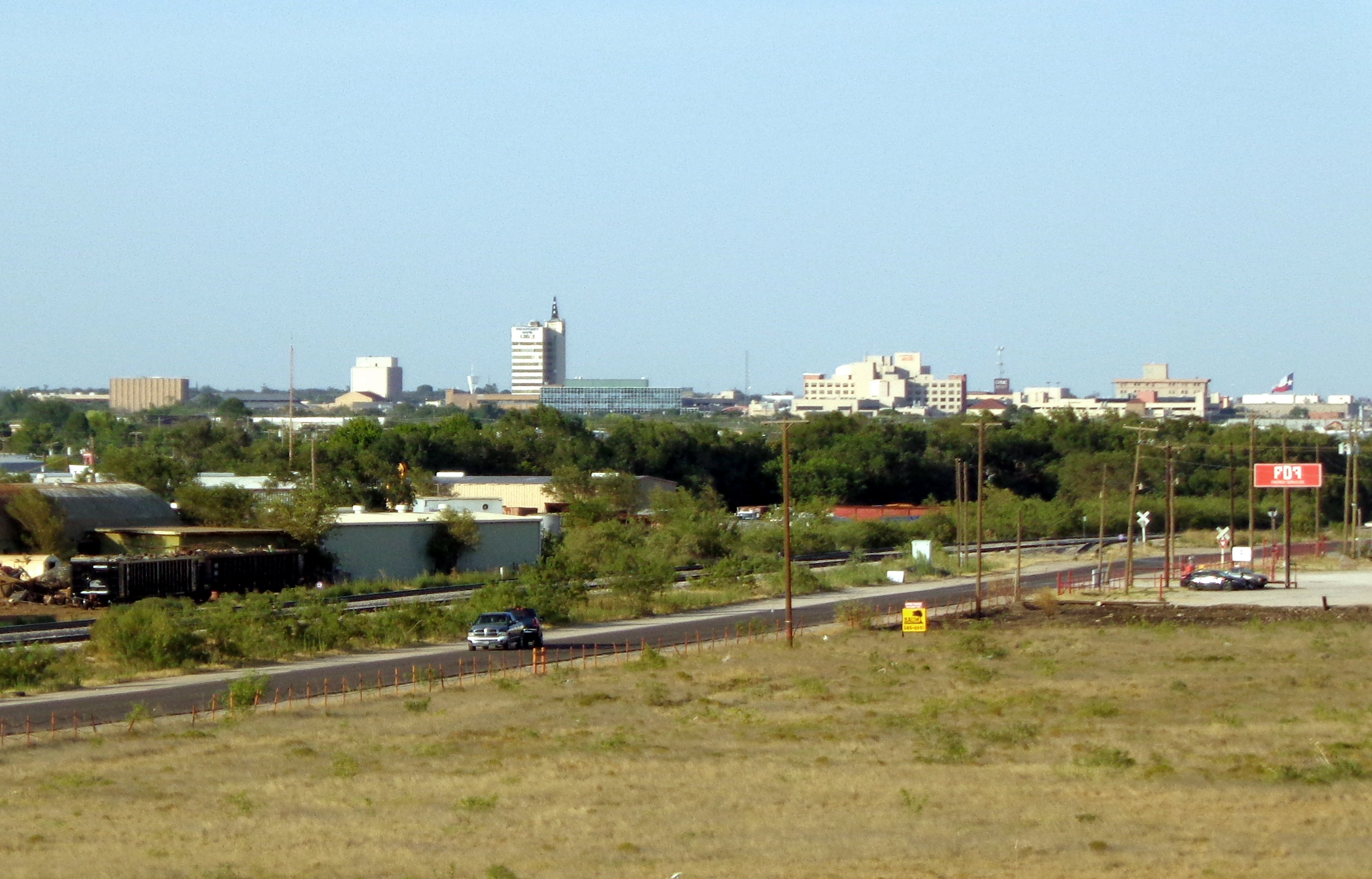
- Top: Downtown Midland in 2007; Bottom: Skyline of Odessa, Texas in 2022
Midland–Odessa–Andrews, TX CSA
City of Midland
City of Odessa
Midland, TX MSA
Odessa, TX MSA
Andrews, TX µSA
- Country: United States
- State: Texas
- Principal cities: Midland; Odessa; Andrews
- Time zone: UTC−6 (CST)
  - Summer (DST): UTC−5 (CDT)

Midland–Odessa is a metropolitan area located on the Texas High Plains about half-way between El Paso and Fort Worth, Texas. This combined statistical area (CSA) is made up of two metropolitan statistical areas (MSAs - Midland and Odessa) and one micropolitan statistical area (µSA - Andrews), and comprises four counties: Andrews, Ector, Martin, and Midland Counties. The Midland–Odessa area is informally known as the Petroplex and Midessa.

In the past, the cities of Midland and Odessa experienced a civic rivalry of bitter competition and political intrigue. Since the early 1990s, the nature of the rivalry has changed into one of friendly competition and economic cooperation. The Midland–Odessa area today is marketed as "Two Cities, no Limits".

== Communities ==
The following are cities in the Midland–Odessa–Andrews, TX CSA listed with their United States Census Bureau 2025 population estimates. No population estimates are released for census-designated places (CDPs), which are ordered based on their 2020 Census population.

=== Cities ===
- Midland (147,615)
- Odessa (122,707)
- Andrews (13,665)
- Stanton (2,694)
- Ackerly (partial) (269)
- Goldsmith (235)

=== Census-designated places ===
- West Odessa (33,340)
- Gardendale (2,020)
- McKinney Acres (852)

=== Unincorporated communities ===
- Greenwood
- Lenorah
- Notrees
- Penwell
- Tarzan

== Geography and climate ==
The Midland–Odessa area, informally known as the Petroplex, akin to the Dallas–Fort Worth metroplex, is located along Interstate 20 in West Texas in a petroleum-rich area called the Permian Basin, which extends into the South Plains region just south of Lubbock, Texas, extending westward into southeastern New Mexico.

Midland–Odessa enjoys a climate typical of the resort cities of the Southwest United States. The terrain type is described as semiarid mesquite-mixed grassland subtropical steppe. Winters are typically mild with a few seasonable cold spells. In the spring, the wind is quite strong, and the summer can bring extended heat waves with many consecutive days with highs of 100°F or more. The average rainfall of Midland–Odessa is 14.96 inches. Midland–Odessa is located in zone 8 according to the USDA 2003 Plant Hardiness Map. On average, the area experiences 316 days of sunshine a year.

== Combined statistical area ==
The Midland–Odessa–Andrews, TX Combined Statistical Area (CSA) is made up of two metropolitan statistical areas (MSAs) and one micropolitan statistical area (µSA) totaling four counties. The CSA includes Martin and Midland Counties comprising the Midland MSA, Ector County comprising the Odessa MSA, and Andrews County comprising the Andrews µSA. The Midland–Odessa–Andrews, TX CSA encompasses 4,221 sq mi (10,930 km^{2}) of area, of which 4,214 sq mi (10,914 km^{2}) is land and 7 sq mi (18 km^{2}) is water.

Statistical Area	2025 Estimate	2020 Census	Change	Area	Density
Midland, TX Metropolitan Statistical Area	193,139	175,220	+10.23%	1,818 sq mi (4,710 km^{2})	106/sq mi (41/km^{2})
Odessa, TX Metropolitan Statistical Area	173,801	165,171	+5.22%	902 sq mi (2,340 km^{2})	193/sq mi (74/km^{2})
Andrews, TX Micropolitan Statistical Area	18,914	18,610	+1.63%	1,501 sq mi (3,890 km^{2})	13/sq mi (5/km^{2})
Total	385,854	359,001	+7.48%	4,221 sq mi (10,930 km^{2})	91/sq mi (35/km^{2})

=== Demographics ===
As of the census of 2020, 340,391 people, 113,241 households, and 77,912 families resided within the CSA. The racial makeup of the CSA was 53.4% White (non-Hispanic White 38.3%), 5.3% African American, 1.0% Native American, 1.8% Asian, 0.2% Pacific Islander, 16.8% from other races, and 21.1% from two or more races. Hispanics or Latinos of any race were 51.6% of the population.

The median income for a household in the CSA was $35,117, and for a family was $41,819. Males had a median income of $33,778 versus $23,013 for females. The per capita income for the CSA was $17,700.

== Economy ==
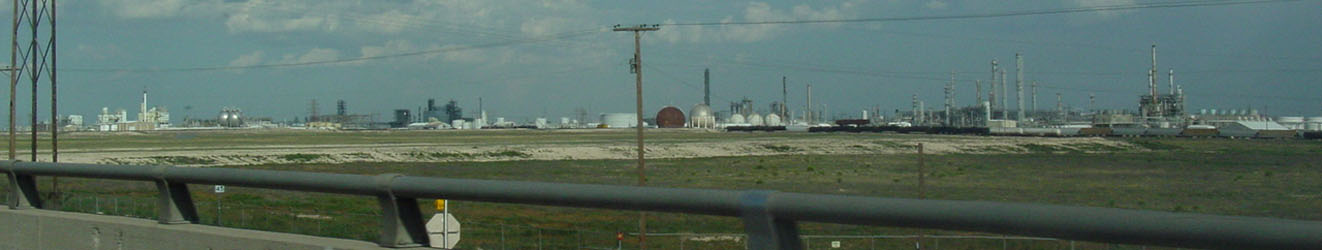
An industrial area of Midland–Odessa as seen from Interstate 20

The economy of the area is heavily dependent on the petroleum industry and has experienced a series of booms and busts as the price of crude oil has fluctuated. The Permian Basin is the source of the New York Mercantile Exchange's benchmark West Texas intermediate crude. Traditionally, the core cities of Midland and Odessa have played very distinct roles in the petroleum industry. Midland is home to most of the corporate offices and has a predominantly white-collar population. Odessa, by contrast, is home to mostly blue-collar workers and industrial facilities. In 2003, Family Dollar constructed its seventh distribution center, in its industrial complex; since then, Telvista, an incoming call center, and Coca-Cola Enterprises have relocated to this complex located on Interstate 20. In even-numbered years, Odessa hosts the Permian Basin International Oil Show—the world's largest inland petroleum exposition—at the Ector County Coliseum. In recent years, both cities have made efforts to diversify into additional industries to reduce their dependence on the petroleum industry. Midland–Odessa is well positioned to become an energy nexus for the region and for the United States as a whole. The metropolitan area is home to two major natural gas powerplants, and in July 2006, Odessa was announced to be one of four possible sites for a FutureGen zero-emissions, coal-fired powerplant (which eventually was awarded to Mattoon, Illinois). The Permian Basin is also home to several windfarms and the city of Andrews is a candidate site for an experimental high-temperature nuclear reactor. This focus on new sources of alternative energy in addition to petroleum has led some to refer to the Permian Basin as the Energy Basin.

== Transportation ==
Midland–Odessa is served by Midland International Air and Space Port (MAF), located between the core cities in Terminal and has since been annexed into Midland proper. This airport serves as a regional hub for cities and towns throughout the Permian Basin and as a gateway to Big Bend National Park. Odessa Schlemeyer Airport and Midland Air Park also serve as an option for smaller jets.

The spirit of cooperation can be seen in the Midland Odessa Transportation Alliance and its centerpiece project La Entrada al Pacifico or Entrance to the Pacific. La Entrada al Pacifico is an official trade corridor that connects the Mexican port city of Topolobampo on the west coast of Mexico with major markets in the Eastern and Northeastern United States and includes an inland port facility to be located in Midland–Odessa.

== 2019 shooting spree ==
Eight people were killed, including the perpetrator, and 25 others were injured in a shooting spree that occurred on Interstate 20, between Midland and Odessa. The shooter was eventually killed by a shootout with the police.
