= List of state highway loops in Texas (300–399) =

- Texas State Highway Loop marker

Highway names
- Interstates: Interstate Highway X (IH-X, I-X)
- US Highways: U.S. Highway X (US X)
- State: State Highway X (SH X)
- Loops: Loop X
- Spurs: Spur X
- Farm or Ranch to Market Roads: Farm to Market Road X (FM X); Ranch-to-Market Road X (RM X)
- Park Roads: Park Road X (PR X)

System links
- Highways in Texas; Interstate; US; State; Former; Toll; Loops; Spurs; FM/RM; Park; Rec

State highway loops in Texas are owned and maintained by the Texas Department of Transportation (TxDOT).

== Loop 300 ==
State Highway Loop 300
- Location: Scurry County
- Existed: February 23, 1956–October 1, 1968

Loop 300 was a proposed route in Snyder. It was designated on February 23, 1956, from US 180 west of the city, around its west and south sides, to US 84 southeast of it. The route was never built, and the designation was cancelled on October 1, 1968.

== Loop 301 ==
State Highway Loop 301
- Location: Hopkins County
- Length: 2.785 mi (4.482 km)
- Existed: February 23, 1956–present

Loop 301 is located in Sulphur Springs. It runs from the junction of SH 19 and SH 154 to I-30/US 67.

Loop 301 was designated on February 23, 1956, from US 67 (later Loop 313; now Bus. US 67) and SH 19 in west Sulphur Springs, northward to SH 154. On September 21, 1965, it was extended southeast to I-30. On April 27, 1967, the section from SH 154 southwest to Loop 313 was transferred to SH 19.

== Loop 302 ==
State Highway Loop 302
- Location: Hunt County
- Existed: March 29, 1956–June 21, 1990

Loop 302 was located in Greenville. It became Bus. US 67, which is now Spur 302.

== Loop 304 ==
State Highway Loop 304
- Location: Houston County
- Length: 8.584 mi (13.815 km)
- Existed: March 28, 1956–present

Loop 304 is a beltway within Crockett, the county seat of Houston County. It is 8.584 miles (13.815 km) in length. It was established in on March 28, 1956. Nearly all of the loop is two lanes wide (one lane in each direction), and provides access for long distance travelers and trucks to bypass the downtown core. Populated areas also dot outside the loop, but have less population density.

Junction list

The entire route is in Crockett, Houston County.

mi	km	Destinations	Notes
		SH 19 (South Fourth Street) – Trinity, Huntsville	Clockwise end
		FM 2110 (Austin Street)	
		SH 7 / SH 21 (West Goliad Avenue) – Centerville, Madisonville	
		FM 2076 (West Houston Avenue)	
		FM 229	
		US 287 / SH 19 (North Fourth Street) – Grapeland, Palestine	
		FM 2022 (Old Rusk Road) – Slocum, Mound City	
		SH 21 (East Houston Avenue) – Crockett, Alto, Nacogdoches	
		SH 7 (East Goliad Avenue) – Kennard, Ratcliff, Lufkin, Nacogdoches	
		US 287 (East Bowie Avenue) – Groveton, Woodville, Beaumont	
		SH 19 (South Fourth Street) – Trinity, Huntsville	Counterclockwise end
1.000 mi = 1.609 km; 1.000 km = 0.621 mi

== Loop 305 ==
State Highway Loop 305
- Location: Zavala County
- Length: 1.074 mi (Note: The certified mileage given is shorter than the actual mileage as TxDOT considers Loop 305 to be discontinuous at rather than concurrent with US 57.) (1.728 km)
- Existed: March 28, 1956–present

Loop 305 is located in La Pryor.

Loop 305 was designated on March 28, 1956, as a loop off of US 83 when it was rerouted.

Loop 305 begins at the intersection of US 83 and US 57 near the town's western boundary. Loop 305 begins running concurrent with US 57 before turning off onto North Pryor Avenue. The highway continues along North Pryor Avenue until ending at an intersection with US 83 near the town's northern boundary.

Junction list

The entire route is in La Pryor, Zavala County.

mi	km	Destinations	Notes
0.0	0.0	US 57 south – Eagle Pass, Piedras Negras; US 83 – Crystal City, Uvalde	Southern terminus; south end of US 57 overlap
0.4	0.64	US 57 north – Batesville	North end of US 57 overlap
1.5	2.4	US 83 – Crystal City, Uvalde	Northern terminus
1.000 mi = 1.609 km; 1.000 km = 0.621 mi: Concurrency terminus

== Loop 306 ==
State Highway Loop 306
- Location: Tom Green County
- Length: 11.666 mi (Note: The certified mileage given is shorter than the actual mileage as TxDOT considers Loop 306 to be discontinuous at rather than concurrent with US 87 and US 277.) (18.775 km)
- Existed: October 24, 1956–present

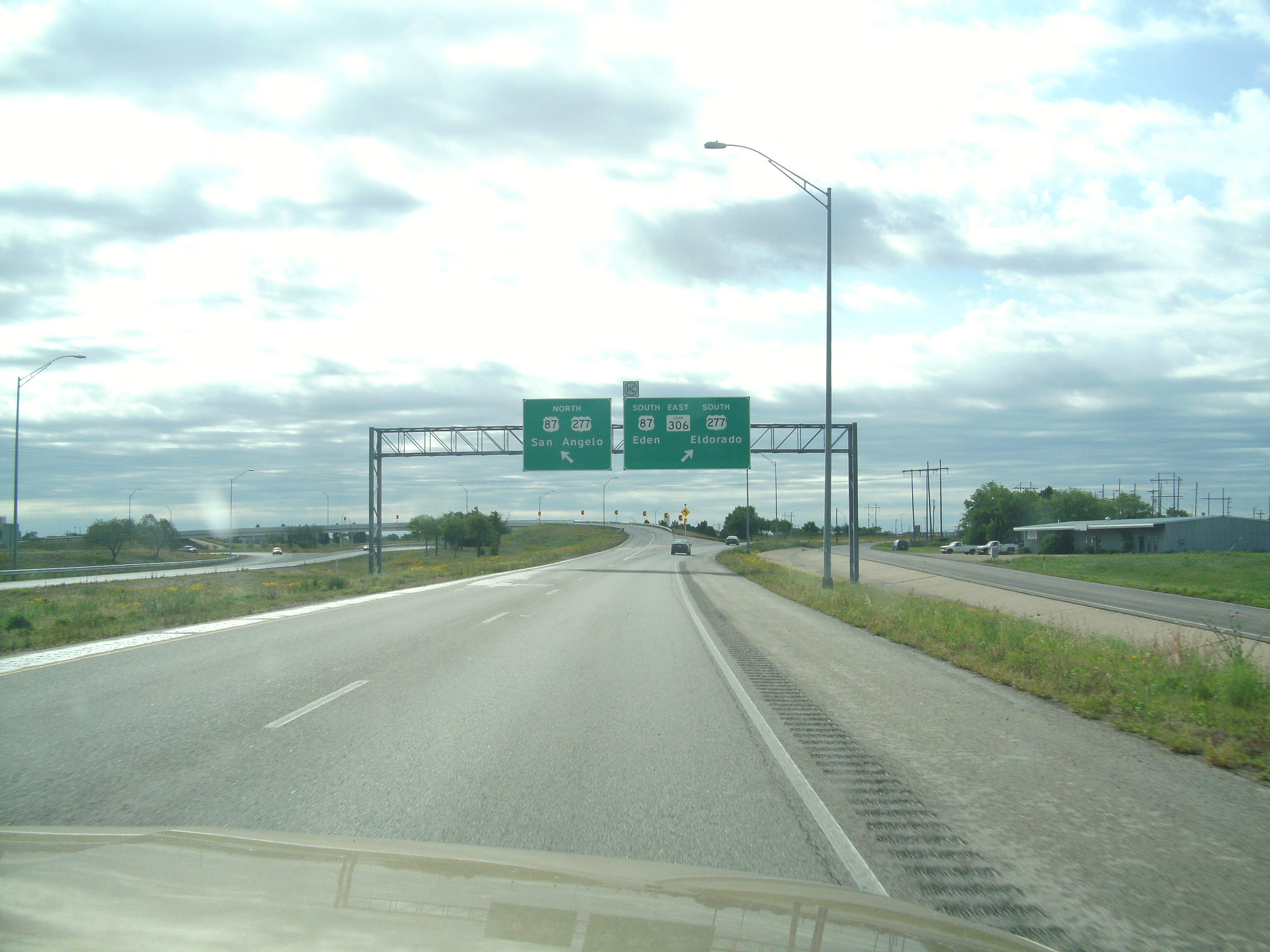
State Loop 306 before US 277/87 interchange

Loop 306 is a state loop that encircles much of San Angelo. Loop 306 begins on the north side of San Angelo, at the US 67/277 interchange, and continues south on the eastern edge of town. The highway multiplexes with US 87 while being routed west. The multiplex ends at the US 87/277/Loop 306 interchange, with Loop 306 routed northwest. Loop 306 ends at the Bus. US 67 (Sherwood Way) overpass, however the freeway continues and is signed as US 67, Houston Harte Expressway; named after the San Angelo-native publishing magnate. The route is often referred to locally as "the Loop" or "Loop 306", despite the terminus of Loop 306 at Sherwood Way. TxDOT upgraded portions of Loop 306 to expand it from a two-lane road to a four-lane divided highway. From the US 67/277 interchange, Loop 306 continues as a four-lane divided highway all the way to US 87. The upgrades included adding two overpasses and improvements to a divided highway.

Loop 306 was designated on October 24, 1956. On July 30, 1976, the section from US 67 west and southwest to US 67 was transferred to rerouted US 67.

Junction list

The entire route is in Tom Green County.

Location	mi	km	Destinations	Notes
San Angelo	0.0	0.0	US 67 (Sherwood Way) / Bus. US 67 east – Mertzon	Western terminus
San Angelo	0.5	0.80	Southwest Boulevard	
San Angelo	1.2	1.9	College Hills Boulevard	
San Angelo	2.0	3.2	RM 584 (Knickerbocker Road)	Access to San Angelo Community Medical Center
San Angelo	3.0	4.8	Foster Road	
San Angelo	4.3	6.9	US 87 north / US 277 north (Bryant Boulevard) / Ben Ficklin Road – San Angelo	East end of freeway; western end of US 87 / US 277 concurrency
San Angelo	5.0	8.0	US 277 south / Loop 378 – Eldorado	Eastern end of US 277 concurrency
	8.7	14.0	US 87 south / FM 1223 – Eden	Eastern end of US 87 concurrency
	11.0	17.7	FM 765	Interchange
	12.6	20.3	FM 388 (Paint Rock Road) – Goodfellow AFB	Interchange
San Angelo	14.7	23.7	FM 380 (Pulliam Street)	Interchange
San Angelo	15.0	24.1	US 67 / US 277 (Houston Harte Expressway)	Interchange; eastern terminus
1.000 mi = 1.609 km; 1.000 km = 0.621 mi: Concurrency terminus

== Loop 307 ==
State Highway Loop 307
- Location: Freestone County
- Existed: February 23, 1956–April 30, 2004

Loop 307 was a proposed route in Teague. It was designated on February 23, 1956, from US 84 (now Bus. US 84) north of Teague, east and south to SH 179, 1 mile (1.6 km) east of Teague. On October 21, 1959, part of the route was transferred to US 84 when that highway was rerouted. On November 25, 1975, FM 553 was designated on the remaining route, but Loop 307 was not cancelled until April 30, 2004.

== Loop 308 ==
State Highway Loop 308
- Location: Burnet County
- Length: 0.798 mi (1,284 m)
- Existed: June 22, 1956–present

Loop 308 is located in Briggs.

Loop 308 was designated on June 22, 1956, as a loop off of US 183 when it was rerouted.

Junction list

The entire route is in Burnet County.

Location	mi	km	Destinations	Notes
	0.0	0.0	US 183	
Briggs	0.5	0.80	FM 2657 north – Copperas Cove	
	0.8	1.3	US 183 – Austin, Lampasas	
1.000 mi = 1.609 km; 1.000 km = 0.621 mi

== Loop 310 ==
State Highway Loop 310
- Location: Dallas County
- Existed: February 23, 1956–November 21, 1991

Loop 310 was located in Carrollton. It was designated on February 23, 1956, as a loop off US 77 (now I-35E). Loop 310 was cancelled on November 21, 1991, and returned to the city of Carrollton.

== Loop 311 ==
State Highway Loop 311
- Location: Gregg County
- Existed: August 1, 1956–June 14, 1968

Loop 311 was located in Kilgore.

Loop 311 was designated on August 1, 1956, from SH 259 (now SH 42) in downtown Kilgore west 2.4 miles (3.9 km) to SH 135 near the west edge of Kilgore. The route was signed as Bus. SH 135 rather than Loop 311. On June 14, 1968, Loop 311 was cancelled and removed from the highway system due to the completion of the rerouting of SH 42.

== Loop 313 ==
State Highway Loop 313
- Location: Hopkins County
- Existed: September 19, 1956–June 21, 1990

Loop 313 was located in Sulphur Springs. It ran along a former alignment of US 67. It is now Bus. US 67.

== Loop 315 ==
State Highway Loop 315
- Location: Hunt County
- Existed: November 21, 1956–June 21, 1990

Loop 315 was located in Greenville.

Loop 315 was designated on November 21, 1956, from US 69 near Peniel south to US 67 southwest of Greenville. On November 30, 1961, the road was extended east over old US 67 to I-30, and southeast to US 69 on October 13, 1971. On May 21, 1979, Loop 315 was routed over US 69 while the old route of Loop 315 was transferred to US 69. Loop 315 was cancelled on June 21, 1990, and transferred to Bus. US 69.

== Loop 316 ==
State Highway Loop 316
- Location: Mitchell County
- Existed: February 26, 1957–June 21, 1990

Loop 316 was located in Loraine. It is now Business I-20.

== Loop 318 ==
=== Loop 318 (1957) ===
State Highway Loop 318
- Location: Callahan County
- Existed: April 23, 1957–July 15, 1957

The first use of Loop 318 was in Callahan County, from US 380 west and north to FM 576, then east along FM 576 to US 380. Loop 318 was cancelled three months later and transferred to FM 880 and FM Spur 880.

=== Loop 318 (1960) ===
State Highway Loop 318
- Location: Washington County
- Existed: January 18, 1960–June 21, 1990

The second use of the Loop 318 designation was in Washington County, as a loop off US 290 in Brenham. This was the former routing of US 290 before it was rerouted on top of a section of Loop 283. On February 28, 1973, the section from US 290 west of Brenham to Market Street was transferred to SH 105. The remainder of Loop 318 was cancelled on June 21, 1990, and transferred to Bus. US 290.

== Loop 319 ==
State Highway Loop 319
- Location: Taylor County
- Existed: April 23, 1957–June 21, 1990

Loop 319 was located in Trent. It is now Business I-20.

== Loop 320 ==
State Highway Loop 320
- Location: Taylor County
- Existed: May 31, 1957–June 21, 1990

Loop 320 was located in Tye. It is now Business I-20.

== Loop 321 ==
State Highway Loop 321
- Location: Wilson County
- Length: 0.753 mi (1,212 m)
- Existed: July 16, 1957–present

Loop 321 is located in Wilson County. It is the former route of US 87 through La Vernia.

== Loop 322 ==
State Highway Loop 322
- Location: Taylor County
- Length: 7.167 mi (11.534 km)
- Existed: August 30, 1957–present

Loop 322 is a 7.167-mile (11.534 km) loop route in the city of Abilene in the U.S. state of Texas. It is located in Taylor County.

== Loop 323 ==
State Highway Loop 323
- Location: Smith County
- Length: 19.708 mi (31.717 km)
- Existed: October 30, 1957–present

Loop 323 is a state highway loop in Texas in the United States. It is a 19.7-mile (31.7 km) highway circling the city of Tyler in Smith County.

== Loop 328 ==
State Highway Loop 328
- Location: Childress County
- Length: 2.854 mi (4.593 km)
- Existed: October 30, 1957–present

Loop 328 is located in Carey.

Loop 328 was designated on October 30, 1957, as a loop off of US 287 when it was rerouted.

== Loop 329 ==
State Highway Loop 329
- Location: Colorado County
- Existed: February 16, 1982–June 21, 1990

Loop 329 was located in Columbus.

Loop 329 was designated on February 16, 1982, from SH 71, 4 miles (6.4 km) northwest of Columbus, southeast and south 5.1 miles (8.2 km) along Fannin Street to I-10. This was formerly a portion of SH 71 before it was rerouted. On June 21, 1990, Loop 329 was cancelled and transferred to Bus. SH 71.

== Loop 332 ==
State Highway Loop 332
- Location: Williamson County
- Existed: January 22, 1958–January 31, 2019

Loop 332 was located in Liberty Hill. Its western terminus was at SH 29. The route headed southeast on a two-lane undivided road that became Main Street. It crossed RM 1869 before turning east at CR 279. Loop 332 crossed a railroad line that is owned by the Capital Metropolitan Transportation Authority and used by the Austin Western Railroad. Loop 332's eastern terminus was at another intersection with SH 29.

Loop 332 was designated on January 22, 1958, as a loop off SH 29 in Liberty Hill. On January 31, 2019, Loop 332 was cancelled and returned to the city of Liberty Hill by request of the city council.

== Loop 333 ==
State Highway Loop 333
- Location: Mitchell County
- Existed: February 22, 1958–June 21, 1990

Loop 333 was located in Westbrook. It is now Business I-20.

== Loop 334 ==
=== Loop 334 (1958) ===
State Highway Loop 334
- Location: Bexar County
- Existed: February 27, 1958–August 7, 1959

The first use of the Loop 334 designation was in Bexar County, from FM 1604 and I-10 west and south to US 90. On August 29, 1958, the road was extended southwest 3.5 miles (5.6 km) to FM 2173 near Macdona. Loop 334 was cancelled on August 7, 1959, and transferred to FM 1604 (now Loop 1604).

=== Loop 334 (1981) ===
State Highway Loop 334
- Location: Panola County
- Existed: October 21, 1981–June 21, 1990

The next use of the Loop 334 designation was in Panola County as a loop off US 79 in Carthage. The same day a break in the route was added at Loop 455 (now Bus. US 59). The route was signed as US 79 Business rather than Loop 334. Loop 334 was cancelled on June 21, 1990, and transferred to Bus. US 79.

== Loop 335 ==
State Highway Loop 335
- Location: Potter and Randall counties
- Length: 39.967 mi (64.321 km)
- Existed: January 18, 1960–present

Loop 335 encircles Amarillo.

Loop 335 was designated on January 18, 1960, from US 60/US 87 south of Amarillo east and north to US 287 east of Amarillo. On January 31, 1961, the road was extended north and west to US 87/US 287 (now Loop 434) and west and north to US 66 (now I-40) on July 30, 1965. On June 21, 1977, the road was extended to new US 87/US 287, replacing a section of FM 1719. On July 24, 1984, the road was extended 10 miles (16 km) north, northeast and east to US 287, replacing a second section of FM 1719 and completing the loop around Amarillo. On April 21, 2018, the road was rerouted along FM 2186 with the old route transferred to FM 2590, although this will not be effective until construction is complete on this section.

== Loop 336 ==
State Highway Loop 336
- Location: Montgomery County
- Length: 17.439 mi (28.065 km)
- Existed: September 27, 1960–present

Loop 336, also known as the Veterans Memorial Highway, encircles the city of Conroe. Through trucks traveling east and west are directed onto this loop, as they are prohibited on SH 105 inside Conroe.

Loop 336 was designated on September 27, 1960, as a loop off SH 105 in Conroe. On November 20, 1984, the road was extended around the eastern and southern sides of Conroe to FM 2854 west of Conroe. On February 23, 1989, the road was extended north 1.1 miles (1.8 km) from FM 2854 to SH 105, replacing FM 3374 and completing the loop around Conroe.

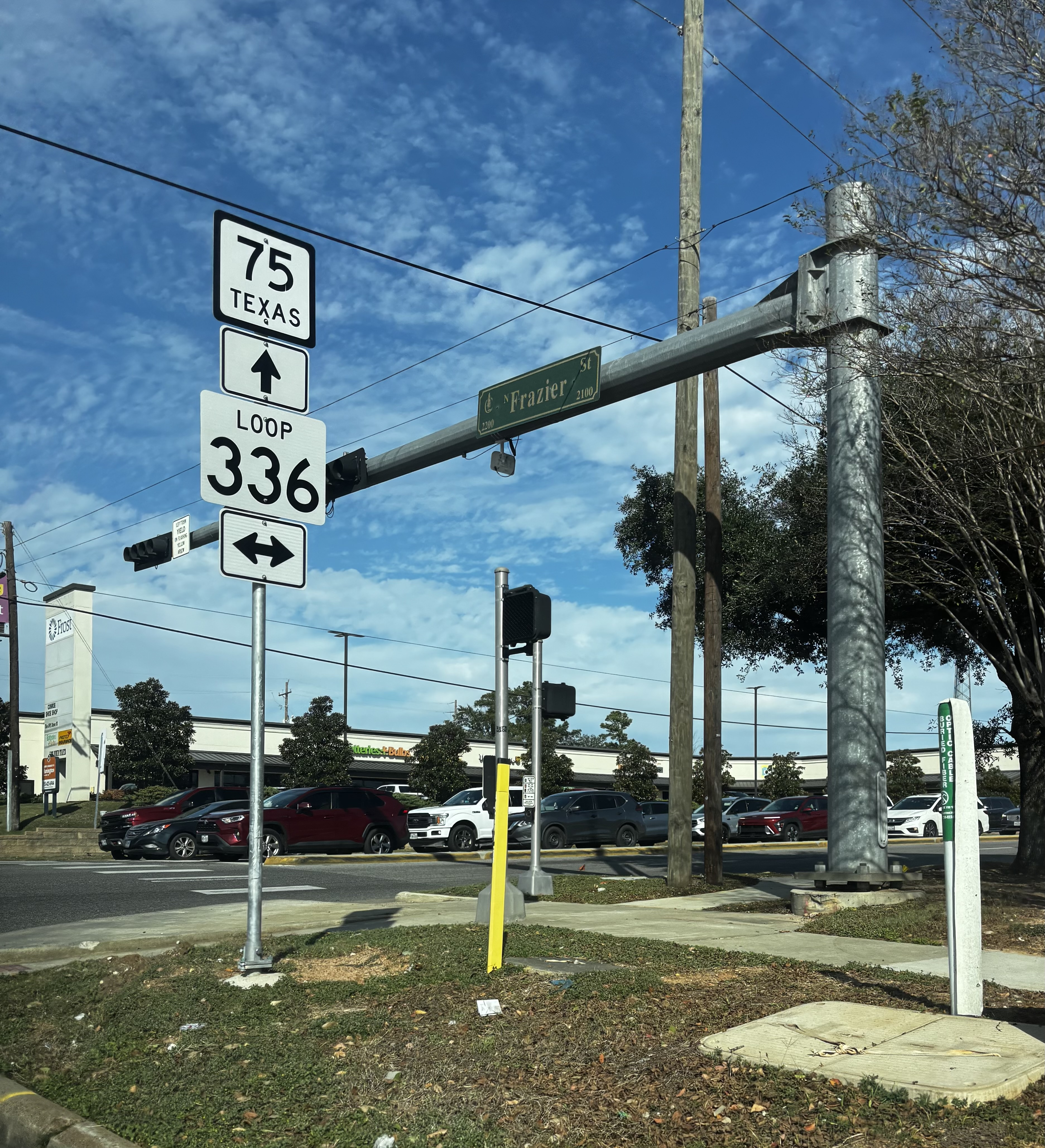
The intersection between Loop 336 (Cartwright Road) and Highway 75 (Frazier Street)

Junction list

The entire route is in Conroe, Montgomery County.

mi	km	Destinations	Notes
0.0	0.0	SH 105 (West Davis Street) – Montgomery, Navasota	Clockwise end; former northern terminus of FM 3374
0.5	0.80	Longmire Road	
1.3	2.1	I-45 (North Freeway) – Houston, Huntsville, Dallas	I-45 exit 88
1.9	3.1	SH 75 (North Frazier Street) – Willis, Huntsville	Former US 75
2.4	3.9	First Street	Interchange
3.2	5.1	FM 1484	
4.2	6.8	Airport Road	Access to Conroe-North Houston Regional Airport; former alignment of FM 1484
4.3	6.9	FM 3083 (Beach Airport Road) – Conroe-North Houston Regional Airport	
6.3	10.1	SH 105 (East Davis Street) – Cleveland, Beaumont	
6.4	10.3	U-Turn	Loop 336 crosses over railroad tracks; U-turns available for clockwise and counterclockwise traffic
7.6	12.2	FM 3083 – Grangerland	
9.7	15.6	FM 1314 (Conroe Porter Road) – Porter	
11.8	19.0	SH 75 (South Frazier Street)	Former US 75
11.8	19.0	I-45 (North Freeway) – Dallas, The Woodlands, Houston	I-45 exit 84
13.5	21.7	Sargent Ed Holcomb Boulevard	
16.1	25.9	Turnaround	Loop 336 crosses over railroad tracks; U-turn available for clockwise traffic only
16.5	26.6	FM 2854 (Metcalf Street) – Montgomery	Interchange; former southern terminus of FM 3374
17.4	28.0	SH 105 (West Davis Street) – Montgomery, Navasota	Counterclockwise end; former northern terminus of FM 3374
1.000 mi = 1.609 km; 1.000 km = 0.621 mi: Incomplete access

== Loop 337 ==
State Highway Loop 337
- Location: Comal County
- Length: 3.029 mi (4.875 km)
- Existed: June 1, 1960–present

Loop 337 is located in New Braunfels.

Loop 337 was designated on June 1, 1960, from I-35 southwest of New Braunfels north, east and south to FM 25 (now SH 46) at then-US 81 (now Business I-35) east of the Guadalupe River. On February 26, 1972, the road was extended to I-35, replacing a section of FM 25. On May 14, 1990, the route description was modified to show that SH 46 was rerouted concurrent with Loop 337.

== Loop 338 ==
State Highway Loop 338
- Location: Ector County
- Length: 29.662 mi (47.736 km)
- Existed: September 26, 1960–present

Texas State Highway Loop 338 (Loop 338) encircles Odessa. Unlike Loop 250 in neighboring Midland, Loop 338 is not a freeway at any point. Instead, it runs as a divided expressway, divided highway and undivided road.

Loop 338 was designated on September 26, 1960, from US 80, 2.5 miles (4.0 km) west of Odessa, north, east, and south around Odessa to then-proposed I-20. On June 30, 1961, the section from US 80 to I-20 was transferred to FM 1357, while Loop 338 was rerouted over a section of FM 1357 from US 80 to a point 2.7 miles (4.3 km) north. On April 3, 1964, the road was extended to I-20 east of Odessa, replacing FM 1357. On September 30, 1964, the road was extended south 0.6 miles (0.97 km) to I-20. On September 26, 1967, the section from I-20 to SH 302 was transferred to SH 302. On September 27, 1985, the road was extended southeast to US 385, creating a concurrency with SH 302. On February 25, 1992, the road was extended west and north to I-20, completing its current route.

Junction list

The entire route is in Ector County.

Location	mi	km	Destinations	Notes
			US 385 – Andrews, Odessa	Interchange
			FM 554 north / Grandview Avenue – Gardendale, Ratliff Stadium	
Odessa			East Yukon Road	Interchange
Odessa			SH 191 – Midland, Odessa	
Odessa			I-20 BL – Midland, Odessa, Midland International Air and Space Port	Interchange
Odessa			I-20 – Abilene, El Paso	I-20 exit 121
			FM 3503 – Odessa	
			US 385 – Odessa, Crane	
			I-20 – El Paso, Abilene	Interchange; I-20 exit 113
			Murphy Street	Interchange
			I-20 BL – Monahans, Odessa	Interchange
Odessa			FM 3472 (16th Street)	Interchange
Odessa			FM 2020 (University Boulevard) – Odessa College	Interchange
Odessa			SH 302 west / Spur 450 east to SH 191 – Kermit, Odessa, Odessa College	Interchange
1.000 mi = 1.609 km; 1.000 km = 0.621 mi

== Loop 340 ==
State Highway Loop 340
- Location: McLennan County
- Length: 5.266 mi (8.475 km)
- Existed: September 27, 1960–present

Texas State Highway Loop 340 encircles Waco.

Loop 340 was designated on September 27, 1960, running from US 84 southeast and east to US 77 south of Waco. On February 26, 1964, the road was extended northwest 5 miles (8.0 km) to US 84 east of Bellmead, replacing Loop 232. On February 29, 1968, the road was extended northwest 1.7 miles (2.7 km) to FM 3051, west of US 81. On September 25, 1984, SH 6 was rerouted concurrent with Loop 340; the old route of SH 6 became Loop 484.

Junction list

The entire route is in McLennan County. All exits are unnumbered.

Location	mi	km	Destinations	Notes
Waco			US 84 / SH 6 north – Gatesville, Waco, Meridian	Southern terminus; continues as SH 6, access to Providence Medical Center
Waco			Imperial Drive	Northbound exit and southbound entrance
Waco			Beverly Drive	Southbound exit and northbound entrance
Waco			Bagby Avenue	Northbound exit and southbound entrance
Robinson			I-35 north – Fort Worth, Dallas	Northbound exit and southbound entrance
Robinson			I-35 – Fort Worth, Dallas, Austin	Access to Hillcrest Baptist Medical Center
Robinson			US 77 – Waco, Cameron	
Robinson			12th Street Road	
Waco			FM 434 (3rd Street Road) / FM 3400 (University Parks Drive) – Baylor University	
Waco			Brazos River turnaround	North end of freeway; northbound exit and southbound entrance
Waco			SH 6 south / Loop 484 west – Marlin, Bryan	North end of SH 6 overlap
Bellmead			US 84 – Waco, Mexia	Interchange
Bellmead			I-35 – Austin, Fort Worth, Dallas	Interchange
Waco			Bus. US 77 / FM 3051 west – Lake Waco	Northern terminus Split intersection
1.000 mi = 1.609 km; 1.000 km = 0.621 mi: Incomplete access

== Loop 343 ==
State Highway Loop 343
- Location: Travis County
- Length: 5.186 mi (8.346 km)
- Existed: May 30, 1961–present

Loop 343 is located in Austin.

Loop 343 was designated on May 30, 1961, from SH 71 east of Austin near Bergstrom Air Force Base, north along US 183, then west and south to US 290 near western Austin. Portions of the route were formerly SH 71 and US 290 before they were rerouted onto Loop 293. On February 25, 1977, Loop 343 was rerouted along 1st Street (now Cesar Chavez Street) with the former route removed altogether. On November 10, 1986, the section from SH 71 north and east to I-35 was removed from the highway system and returned to the city of Austin.

== Loop 344 ==
State Highway Loop 344
- Location: Parker and Tarrant counties
- Length: 1.541 mi (2.480 km)
- Existed: November 22, 1960–present

Loop 344 is located in Azle.

Loop 344 was designated on November 22, 1960, as a loop off SH 199 in Azle as a replacement of SH 199 when it was rerouted. The highway is known locally as Main Street and runs through the town's central business district.

== Loop 345 ==
State Highway Loop 345
- Location: Bexar County
- Existed: January 26, 1962–December 18, 2014

Loop 345 was located in San Antonio.

Loop 345 was designated on January 26, 1962, as a loop off I-10 in San Antonio as a replacement of US 87 when it was rerouted. The route was signed as US 87 Business until 1992. On December 18, 2014, the section from Balcones Heights south to I-10 was removed and returned to the city of San Antonio and the remainder was redesignated as Spur 345.

== Loop 346 ==
State Highway Loop 346
- Location: Kaufman County
- Existed: June 25, 1984–June 21, 1990

Loop 346 was located in Kemp.

Loop 346 was designated on June 25, 1984, as a loop off US 175 in Kemp as a replacement of US 175 when it was rerouted. On June 21, 1990, Loop 346 was cancelled and transferred to Bus. US 175.

== Loop 350 ==
State Highway Loop 350
- Location: Austin County
- Length: 1.119 mi (1.801 km)
- Existed: February 7, 1983–present

State Highway Loop 350 (Loop 350) is a loop in Sealy. It runs from SH 36 via Sealy to SH 36.

== Loop 352 ==
State Highway Loop 352
- Location: Wise County
- Existed: August 29, 1961–June 21, 1990

Loop 352 was located in Chico.

Loop 352 was designated on August 29, 1961, as a loop off SH 114 (now SH 101) in Chico as a replacement of SH 114 when it was rerouted. On June 21, 1990, Loop 352 was cancelled and transferred to Bus. SH 101.

== Loop 353 ==
State Highway Loop 353
- Location: Bexar County
- Length: 7.875 mi (12.674 km)
- Existed: November 22, 1960–present

Loop 353 is a 7.875-mile-long (12.674 km) loop route in the U.S. state of Texas that follows a former route of U.S. Highway 81 (US 81) in San Antonio.

== Loop 354 ==
State Highway Loop 354
- Location: Dallas County
- Existed: September 19, 1961–March 29, 2018

Loop 354 was located in Dallas. Loop 354 was designated on September 19, 1961, from I-35E in the north part of Dallas, southward along the old route of US 77 to I-35E in the south part of Dallas. On June 25, 1991, the section from Loop 12 in north Dallas to I-35E in the south part of Dallas was cancelled and given to the city of Dallas. The remainder was cancelled on March 29, 2018, and was given to the city of Dallas.

== Loop 355 ==
State Highway Loop 355
- Location: Taylor County
- Existed: September 16, 1961–June 21, 1990

Loop 355 was located in Abilene. It is now Business I-20.

== Loop 357 ==
State Highway Loop 357
- Location: Wise County
- Existed: April 30, 1962–June 21, 1990

Loop 357 was located in Decatur. It is now Bus. US 81.

== Loop 358 ==
State Highway Loop 358
- Location: Orange County
- Existed: April 30, 1962–June 21, 1990

Loop 358 was located in Orange.

Loop 358 was designated on April 30, 1962, as a loop off I-10 in Orange as a replacement of US 90 when it was rerouted. The route was signed as Bus. US 90 rather than Loop 358. On June 21, 1990, Loop 358 was cancelled and transferred to Bus. US 90.

== Loop 360 ==
State Highway Loop 360
- Location: Travis County
- Length: 13.987 mi (22.510 km)
- Existed: March 29, 1962–present

Loop 360 is a 13.99-mile (22.51 km) loop route in Austin in the U.S. state of Texas.

== Loop 361 ==
State Highway Loop 361
- Location: Grimes County
- Length: 0.199 mi (320 m)
- Existed: June 25, 1962–present

Loop 361 is located in Bedias.

Loop 361 was designated on June 25, 1962, from SH 90/FM 1696 in Bedias west and south to FM 1696.

== Loop 362 ==
State Highway Loop 362
- Location: Potter County
- Length: 0.34 mi (550 m)
- Existed: June 26, 1962–present

Loop 362 is located in Amarillo.

Loop 362 was designated on June 26, 1962, along Nelson Street (now Quarter Horse Drive) from I-40 to US 287 (now Loop 395). Although Loop 362 was cancelled on June 21, 1990, and transferred to Bus. US 287, it was changed back to Loop 362 four months later.

== Loop 363 ==
State Highway Loop 363
- Location: Bell County
- Length: 10.540 mi (16.962 km)
- Existed: November 22, 1960–present

Loop 363 (also known as the H.K. Dodgen Loop) is a state highway loop that encircles the Texas city of Temple in Central Texas.

== Loop 365 ==
State Highway Loop 365
- Location: Collin County
- Existed: April 24, 1967–June 21, 1990

Loop 365 was located in Lavon.

Loop 365 was designated on April 24, 1967, as a loop off SH 78 in Lavon as a replacement of SH 78 when it was rerouted. The route was signed as SH 78 Business rather than Loop 365. On June 21, 1990, Loop 365 was cancelled and transferred to Bus. SH 78.

== Loop 367 ==
=== Loop 367 (1962) ===
State Highway Loop 367
- Location: Scurry County
- Existed: July 31, 1962–June 21, 1990

The first use of the Loop 367 designation was in Scurry County as a loop off US 84 in Hermleigh. The route was signed as US 84 Business rather than Loop 367. On June 21, 1990, Loop 367 was cancelled and transferred to Bus. US 84.

=== Loop 367 (1996) ===
State Highway Loop 367
- Location: Johnson County
- Existed: June 18, 1996–December 19, 1996

The next use of the Loop 367 designation was in Johnson County, from US 67, 3.3 miles (5.3 km) west of US 67/SH 174 in Cleburne, north and east 7.9 miles (12.7 km) to SH 174, 1 mile (1.6 km) north of SH 174/SH 171, north of Cleburne. Loop 367 was cancelled six months later by district request and transferred to US 67 when it was rerouted; the former route of US 67 became Bus. US 67.

== Loop 368 ==
State Highway Loop 368
- Location: Bexar County
- Length: 8.115 mi (13.060 km)
- Existed: August 1, 1962–present

Loop 368 is located in San Antonio.

Loop 368 was designated on August 1, 1962, from I-35 at Fratt southwest along old US 81 to I-35 and Broadway as a replacement of US 81 when it was rerouted east. The route was signed as Bus. US 81 until 1991 when US 81 was decommissioned in favor of I-35. On December 18, 2014, the section from Alamo Heights to I-410 was planned to be removed from the highway system. This section was to be removed when construction was complete, but in January 2022, TxDOT reversed its decision and retained its jurisdiction as San Antonio did not provide the required acceptance letter for the project.

== Loop 369 ==
State Highway Loop 369
- Location: Lubbock and Hale counties
- Length: 1.496 mi (2.408 km)
- Existed: September 25, 1962–present

Loop 369 is located in Abernathy. It is an old alignment of US 87 through the city.

== Loop 370 ==
State Highway Loop 370
- Location: Wichita County
- Length: 1.541 mi (2.480 km)
- Existed: September 25, 1962–June 21, 1990

Loop 370 was located in Wichita Falls.

Loop 370 was designated on September 25, 1962, from US 287 near northwestern Iowa Park east via Wichita Falls to SH 79/Loop 165. The route was signed as US 287 Business rather than Loop 370. On February 8, 1972, the western terminus was moved to US 287 in Iowa Park. Loop 370 was cancelled on June 21, 1990, and transferred to Bus. US 287.

== Loop 372 ==
State Highway Loop 372
- Location: Dallas County
- Existed: February 28, 1962–December 19, 1991

Loop 372 was located in Rowlett.

Loop 372 was designated on February 28, 1962, from SH 66 west of Long Branch south and east to Liberty Grove Road, then north to then-proposed SH 66. On December 19, 1991, Loop 372 was cancelled and transferred to Bus. SH 66.

== Loop 373 ==
State Highway Loop 373
- Location: Wise County
- Length: 1.352 mi (2.176 km)
- Existed: March 29, 2007–present

Loop 373 is located in Bridgeport.

Loop 373 was designated on March 29, 2007, from US 380 south, west, and south to SH 114 as a replacement of a section of Bus. SH 114 (old Loop 373) and all of Bus. US 380 (former Spur 129).

=== Loop 373 (1962) ===
State Highway Loop 373
- Location: Wise County
- Existed: November 1, 1962–June 21, 1990

The original Loop 373 was designated on November 1, 1962, from FM 920 and new SH 114 east to Spur 129, then south to SH 114. On June 21, 1990, Loop 373 was cancelled and transferred to Bus. SH 114.

== Loop 374 ==
State Highway Loop 374
- Location: Hidalgo and Cameron counties
- Existed: March 20, 1963–June 21, 1990

Loop 374 was designated on March 20, 1963, from US 83 near western Mission east to US 83 near western Harlingen. The designation became effective when traffic was routed on new US 83. The route was also signed as US 83 Business rather than Loop 374. On March 2, 1967, the road was extended west 5.5 miles (8.9 km) to US 83, 0.5 miles (0.80 km) west of FM 1427. On September 27, 1987, Loop 374 was rerouted in Mission. On June 21, 1990, Loop 374 was cancelled and transferred to Bus. US 83.

== Loop 375 ==
State Highway Loop 375
- Location: El Paso County
- Length: 48.895 mi (78.689 km)
- Existed: January 26, 1962–present

Loop 375 is a beltway that partially encircles the city of El Paso, Texas. The beltway is mostly a freeway, except for its northern section, which includes at-grade intersections.

== Loop 376 ==
State Highway Loop 376
- Location: Chambers County
- Existed: October 31, 1962–August 4, 1988

Loop 376 was located in Winnie.

Loop 376 was designated on October 31, 1962, from SH 124/FM 1406 at Winnie, east and northeast 1.3 miles (2.1 km) to SH 73. On August 4, 1988, Loop 376 was cancelled by district request and transferred to FM 1406.

== Loop 377 ==
State Highway Loop 377
- Location: Mitchell County
- Existed: January 14, 1963–June 21, 1990

Loop 377 was located in Colorado City. It is now Business I-20.

== Loop 378 ==
State Highway Loop 378
- Location: Tom Green County
- Length: 2.105 mi (3.388 km)
- Existed: December 4, 1968–present

Loop 378 is located in San Angelo.

Loop 378 was designated on December 4, 1968, from US 87 north of San Angelo along Chadbourne St to US 87 at Washington Drive as a replacement of US 87 when it was rerouted. On February 19, 1972, the road was extended south to US 87 when it was rerouted again. On March 29, 1988, the section from US 87 to FM 388 was given to San Angelo and the section from FM 388 to FM 1223 became part of FM 1223.

== Loop 382 ==
State Highway Loop 382
- Location: Tarrant County
- Existed: April 18, 1963–June 21, 1990

Loop 382 was located in Grapevine.

Loop 382 was designated on April 18, 1963, as a loop off SH 114 in Grapevine as a replacement of SH 114 when it was rerouted. The route was signed as SH 114 Business rather than Loop 382. On June 21, 1990, Loop 382 was cancelled and transferred to Bus. SH 114.

== Loop 384 ==
State Highway Loop 384
- Location: Williamson County
- Existed: August 1, 1963–June 21, 1990

Loop 384 was located in Round Rock. It was redesignated Business I-35, a segment of which later became the now-cancelled Spur 379.

== Loop 385 ==
State Highway Loop 385
- Location: Lamb County
- Length: 1.407 mi (2.264 km)
- Existed: May 24, 1963–present

Loop 385 is located in Bainer.

Loop 385 was designated on May 24, 1963, on the current route as a replacement of US 84 when it was rerouted.

== Loop 387 ==
State Highway Loop 387
- Location: Denton County
- Existed: September 26, 1963–December 19, 1991

Loop 387 was located in Pilot Point.

Loop 387 was designated on September 26, 1963, as a loop off SH 99 (now US 377) in Pilot Point as a replacement of SH 99 when it was rerouted. On December 19, 1991, Loop 387 was cancelled and transferred to Bus. US 377.

== Loop 388 ==
State Highway Loop 388
- Location: Lubbock County
- Length: 2.351 mi (3.784 km)
- Existed: September 26, 1963–present

Loop 388 is located in Shallowater.

Loop 388 was designated on September 26, 1963, as a loop off of US 84 in Shallowater as a replacement of US 84 when it was rerouted.

== Loop 389 ==
State Highway Loop 389
- Location: Eastland County
- Length: 1.120 mi (1.802 km)
- Existed: September 26, 1963–present

Loop 389 is located in Carbon.

Loop 389 was designated on September 26, 1963, as a loop off SH 6 in Carbon as a replacement of SH 6 when it was rerouted. The route was signed as SH 6 Business rather than Loop 389. On March 2, 1967, a 0.7-mile (1.1 km) section from FM 2526 north to SH 6 was cancelled (it was already a portion of FM 2526).

== Loop 390 ==
State Highway Loop 390
- Location: Harrison County
- Length: 10.907 mi (17.553 km)
- Existed: August 31, 1965–present

State Highway Loop 390 (Loop 390) is a state highway loop that forms a partial beltway around Marshall, Texas.

== Loop 391 ==
State Highway Loop 391
- Location: Fannin County
- Length: 0.320 mi (515 m)
- Existed: November 20, 1963–present

Loop 391 is located in Windom.

Loop 391 was designated on November 20, 1963, as a loop from FM 1743 in Windom east and north via Main Street to US 82.

== Loop 392 ==
State Highway Loop 392
- Location: Johnson County
- Existed: November 20, 1963–October 25, 1990

Loop 392 was located in Alvarado. It is now Business I-35.

== Loop 393 ==
State Highway Loop 393
- Location: Polk County
- Length: 1.738 mi (2.797 km)
- Existed: November 20, 1963–present

Loop 393 is located in Goodrich.

Loop 393 was designated on November 20, 1963, as a loop off of US 59 in Goodrich as a replacement for US 59 when it was rerouted.

== Loop 395 ==
State Highway Loop 395
- Location: Potter County
- Length: 2.195 mi (3.533 km)
- Existed: December 20, 1963–present

Loop 395 is located in Amarillo.

Loop 395 was designated on December 20, 1963, from I-40 and Tee Anchor Boulevard along old US 287 to Pierce Street. On June 21, 1990, Loop 395 was transferred to Bus. US 287, but was transferred back to Loop 395 four months later.

== Loop 396 ==
State Highway Loop 396
- Location: McLennan County
- Length: 5.135 mi (8.264 km)
- Existed: May 27, 1969–present

Loop 396 is located in Waco.

Loop 396 was designated on May 27, 1969, as a re-designation of Spur 396 when it was extended to SH 6.

Loop 396 begins at the Circle, a traffic circle intersection where the highway meets US Bus. 77, La Salle Avenue, and Circle Road, as Valley Mills Drive. Leaving the Circle, the road almost immediately intersects I-35/US 77 (Jack Kultgen Expressway), then intersects Bagby Avenue before entering Beverly Hills. In Beverly Hills, Loop 396 runs near the town's northern boundary, crosses Waco Creek, then re-enters Waco after crossing over a rail line. The highway has an interchange with Spur 298 (Franklin Avenue), then intersects US 84 (Waco Drive), passing by several commercial and retail areas as it reaches Bosque Boulevard. At Bosque Boulevard, Loop 396 turns southwest onto the road and continues along Bosque Boulevard until ending at an interchange with SH 6.

Junction list

The entire route is in Waco, McLennan County.

mi	km	Destinations	Notes
0.0	0.0	Bus. US 77 – Marlin, Bryan	Traffic circle
0.06	0.097	I-35 (US 77) – Dallas, Fort Worth, Austin	I-35 exit 333A
1.6	2.6	Spur 298 (Franklin Avenue)	Interchange
2.3	3.7	US 84 (West Waco Drive)	
5.1	8.2	SH 6	Interchange; access to Meadowlake Medical Center and Ascension Providence Hospital
1.000 mi = 1.609 km; 1.000 km = 0.621 mi
