= Texas State Highway Spur 450 =

Road in Midland-Odessa, Texas

State Highway Spur 450
- Kermit Highway

Route information
- Maintained by TxDOT
- Length: 2.715 mi (4.369 km)
- Existed: September 26, 1967–present

Major junctions
- West end: SH 302 / Loop 338 in West Odessa
- East end: US 385 in Odessa

Location
- Country: United States
- State: Texas

Highway system
- Highways in Texas; Interstate; US; State; Former; Toll; Loops; Spurs; FM/RM; Park; Rec
← Spur 449	→ Spur 451

Spur 450 is a highway spur in the Midland–Odessa metropolitan area in the U.S. state of Texas. The highway is named Kermit Highway.

== Route description ==
Spur 450 begins at a junction with SH 302/Loop 338 in West Odessa. The highway travels in a southeast direction down Kermit Highway and enters Odessa near an intersection with FM 1882. Spur 450 ends at an intersection with US 385 just north of downtown Odessa.

== History ==
Spur 450 was designated on September 26, 1967, along the current route. The highway follows an old route of SH 302 through Odessa.

== Junction list ==
The entire route is in Ector County.

Location	mi	km	Destinations	Notes
West Odessa	0.0	0.0	SH 302 / Loop 338	
West Odessa	0.2	0.32	SH 191 east (42nd Street)	
Odessa	1.3	2.1	FM 1882 (County Road West)	
Odessa	1.7	2.7	FM 2020 west (University Boulevard)	
Odessa	2.7	4.3	US 385 (Grant Avenue)	
1.000 mi = 1.609 km; 1.000 km = 0.621 mi
