= Odessa metropolitan area =

Odessa metropolitan area may refer to:

- The metropolitan area surrounding the city of Odesa, in Ukraine
- The Odessa metropolitan area, Texas, surrounding the city of Odessa, Texas, USA
