= Ector County Independent School District =

School district in Texas

Coordinates: 31.8501°N 102.3732°W

Ector County Independent School District (ECISD) is a public school district based in Odessa, Texas, United States.

In addition to the majority of Odessa (the portions in Ector County), the district also serves the communities of West Odessa, Gardendale, and Goldsmith, as well as rural areas in Ector County.

ECISD was established in 1921. In 2011, the school district was rated "academically acceptable" by the Texas Education Agency. This district is home to the AVID National Demonstration School, Odessa High School.

== Schools ==
=== High schools (grades 9–12) ===
- Odessa High School
- Permian High School
- George H.W. Bush New Tech Odessa
- OCTECHS Odessa Career and Technical Early College High School
- Odessa Collegiate Academy at Odessa College

=== Alternative education schools (grades 9–12) ===
- Alternative Education Center
- Ector County Youth Center

=== Middle schools (grades 6–8) ===
- James Bonham Middle School
- James Bowie Middle School
- David Crockett Middle School
- Ector College Prep Middle School
- Adm. Chester W. Nimitz Middle School
- Wilson-Young (Alfred Mac Wilson and Marvin Rex Young) Medal of Honor Middle School
- Adela & Gilbert Vasquez Middle School

=== Elementary schools (grades K–5) ===
- Annie Webb Blanton Elementary
- Dr. Lee Buice Elementary
- Pres. David Gouverneur Burnet Elementary
- Dr. Lauro F. Cavazos Elementary
- Lt. Richard Dowling Elementary
- Edward K. Downing Elementary
- Murry Fly Elementary
- Goliad Elementary
- Gonzales Elementary
- John Ireland Elementary
- Pres. Lyndon Baines Johnson Elementary
- Barbara Jordan Elementary
- W. D. Noel Elementary
- Gov. Elisha M. Pease Elementary
- Gov. L. Sul Ross Elementary
- Gen. Sam Houston Elementary
- San Jacinto Elementary
- G.E. "Buddy" West Elementary

=== Elementary magnet schools (grades K–5) ===
- Stephen F. Austin Montessori Elementary Magnet
- Edward L. Blackshear Elementary Magnet
- Capt. Ewen Cameron Dual Language Elementary Magnet
- John Coffee Hays Elementary Magnet
- Gale Pond/Alamo Year Round Elementary Magnet
- Hays STEAM Academy Magnet
- Benjamin Milam Elementary Magnet
- John H. Reagan Elementary Magnet
  - 2005 National Blue Ribbon School
- Lorenzo de Zavala Elementary Magnet

=== Early education centers (pre-kindergarten) ===
- Burleson Early Education Center
- Dr. George Washington Carver Early Education Center
- Pres. Mirabeau B. Lamar Early Education Center
- Odessa YMCA Learning Center

=== Defunct schools ===
- AIM High School
- Edward L. Blackshear Junior/Senior High School (now Blackshear Elementary School)
- Career Center (now George W. New Tech Odessa)
- Ector High School (now Ector Middle School)
- Col. James Walker Fannin Early Education Center (originally West Side Elementary)
- Goldsmith Elementary
- Hood Junior High School (now Wilson-Young Middle School)
- Notrees Elementary
- Thomas Jefferson Rusk Elementary
- Teen Parent Center
