= Badger, Texas =

Ghost town in Texas, US

Badger
- Ghost town
- Location in Texas
- Coordinates: 31.7290177°N 102.6143134°W
- Country: United States
- State: Texas
- County: Ector
- Elevation: 2,920 ft (890 m)

Badger is a ghost town in Ector County, Texas, United States. Situated on the Texas and Pacific Railway, a station was established there in 1926. In the late 1920s, an oil boom caused the population to reach 200, which fell to 40 by 1940. It was abandoned by 1980.
