= Texas State Highway 302 =

Highway in Texas

State Highway 302
- SH 302, highlighted in red

Route information
- Maintained by TxDOT
- Length: 83.17 mi (133.85 km)
- Existed: 1939–present

Major junctions
- West end: US 285 southwest of Mentone
- SH 115 near Kermit; SH 18 in Kermit; SH 158 near Goldsmith
- East end: I-20 at Odessa

Location
- Country: United States
- State: Texas
- Counties: Reeves, Loving, Winkler, Ector

Highway system
- Highways in Texas; Interstate; US; State; Former; Toll; Loops; Spurs; FM/RM; Park; Rec
← SH 301	→ SH 303

State Highway 302 (SH 302) is a Texas state highway maintained by the Texas Department of Transportation (TxDOT). The 83.2-mile (133.9 km) route runs from U.S. Route 285 northwest of Pecos to Interstate 20 near Odessa. The route passes through Reeves, Loving, Winkler, and Ector counties. SH 302 has intersections with SH 115 and SH 18 in the Kermit area, and SH 158 east of Notrees. The route intersects Loop 338 and Spur 450 in West Odessa and then follows Loop 338 along the west side of Odessa until SH 302 terminates at I-20. SH 302 also intersects several Farm to Market Roads and an Interstate business route.

SH 302 was originally designated in 1938 as a route between Kermit and Odessa, but has since incorporated the former SH 276 and a defunct Farm to Market Road to achieve its present length. Loving County, where the route passes through Mentone, is the nation's least populous county in stark contrast to the urbanized eastern end of the route in the Odessa area.

== History ==

SH 302 was originally created on January 26, 1939, from Odessa northwest 12.7 miles in the direction of Kermit. On February 20, 1939, SH 302 was extended to Kermit, but with the route's designation being contingent upon completion of work then being done in Winkler County. Soon after, the state assumed maintenance of the Ector County portion, and the following year in 1940 the state assumed maintenance of the Winkler County part of the route. On September 7, 1938, SH 276 was designated over the current western terminus at US 285 to Mentone, although a portion of that route existed as early as 1936 as an earth road from US 285 to the former town of Arno.

On April 16, 1946, SH 276 was designated over a second, discontinuous portion of the present route between SH 115 west of Kermit to SH 82 in Kermit. On August 12, 1946, that designation was dropped and that segment was added as an extension of SH 302 westward to SH 115. On July 14, 1949, Farm to Market Road 1211 (FM 1211) was designated over a 2.0-mile (3.2 km) section of the present route from Mentone to the northeast. On December 17, 1952, FM 1211 was extended incrementally to the Winkler County line and then to SH 115. On December 1, 1953, the designation of SH 276 was dropped and that road between US 285 and Mentone became part of SH 302, and SH 302 was signed, but not designated, along FM 1211 from Mentone to SH 115 near Kermit. On February 27, 1958, SH 82, the intersecting route in Kermit, was renamed SH 18.

On September 26, 1967, SH 302 was rerouted over Loop 338 in Ector County to I-20. Its former route between Loop 338 and US 385 in Odessa was then designated as Spur 450. On August 29, 1990, the section of SH 302 from Mentone to SH 115 near Kermit was officially designated, cancelling FM 1211.

== Route description ==
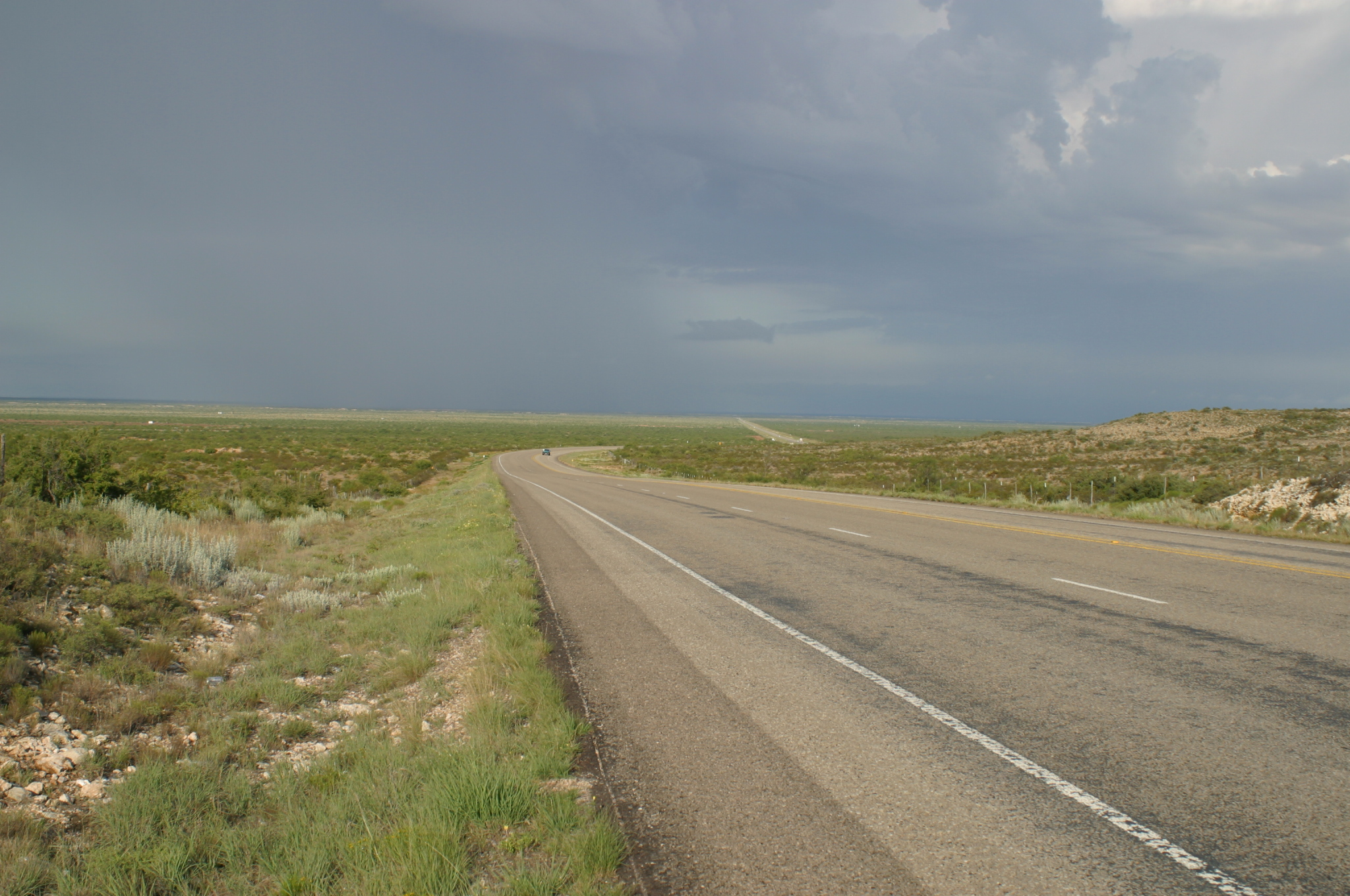
State Highway 302 about 3 km west of Notrees, Texas

SH 302 begins at US 285 between Pecos and Orla in Reeves County as a two-lane road. The route proceeds to the northeast crossing the Pecos River before passing through Mentone in Loving County. The route continues eastward crossing into Winkler County and intersecting SH 115 just outside Kermit. In Kermit, the route is known as Jim Sharp Blvd. and widens to four lanes with a left turn lane in the middle. After crossing SH 18, the route continues eastward losing the left turn lane as it leaves town. The route continues as a four-lane, undivided highway into Ector County where the route is known as Kermit Hwy. Just east of Notrees, the route becomes a divided highway and passes along the northern edge of West Odessa before joining along Loop 338, Odessa's beltway. The passage of SH 302 along Loop 338 begins as a freeway, but later has limited crossings at grade. SH 302 terminates at the intersection of Loop 338 and I-20.

The route passes through largely level terrain requiring only gentle grades. The route traverses many oil fields along its length, and encounters fields of sand dunes east of Kermit. The western portion of the highway west of Kermit is especially isolated as the route passes through Loving County, the only county in the nation with fewer than 100 residents.

== Major intersections ==
County	Location	mi	km	Destinations	Notes
Reeves		0	0.0	US 285 – Pecos, Carlsbad	Western terminus
Loving		3.6	5.8	FM 867	
Loving	Mentone	5.4	8.7	FM 1933 north (Pecos Street)	
Loving	Mentone	5.4	8.7	FM 1933 south (Dallas Street)	
Winkler		30.3	48.8	FM 1232 – Wink	
Winkler		33.5	53.9	FM 874	
Winkler		35.4	57.0	SH 115 – Wink	Interchange
Winkler	Kermit	37.5	60.4	SH 18 – Monahans, Jal	
Ector		59.0	95.0	FM 2019	
Ector		63.0	101.4	SH 158 / FM 181 – Goldsmith, Frankel City, Midland	
Ector	West Odessa	68.5	110.2	FM 866 to I-20 – Goldsmith	
Ector	West Odessa	76.2	122.6	FM 1936 to SH 158 / I-20	
Ector	West Odessa	78.4	126.2	Loop 338 north / Spur 450 east	Interchange; west end of Loop 338 overlap
Ector	Odessa	79.5	127.9	FM 2020	Interchange
Ector	Odessa	80.5	129.6	FM 3472 (16th Street)	Interchange
Ector		82.2	132.3	I-20 BL to I-20 west – Odessa, Monahans	Interchange
Ector		82.6	132.9	Murphy Street	Interchange
Ector		83.2	133.9	I-20 / Loop 338 south – Monahans, Midland	Interchange; east end of Loop 338 overlap; eastern terminus; I-20 exit 113
1.000 mi = 1.609 km; 1.000 km = 0.621 mi: Concurrency terminus
