= Pleasant Farms, Texas =

Unincorporated community in Texas, US

Coordinates: 31°40′33″N 102°22′22″W

Pleasant Farms is an unincorporated community in southeastern Ector County, Texas, United States, and part of the Odessa Metropolitan Statistical Area. Pleasant Farms has a population of 21,748.
