= George H.W. Bush New Tech Odessa =

Location
- 300 E. 29th Street; Odessa, Texas 79762; United States; 31.8700°N 102.3792°W

Information
- Type: Public
- Established: 2011
- School district: Ector County Independent School District
- Dean: James Porter
- Principal: Abel Avila
- Staff: 40.47 (FTE)
- Grades: 9-12
- Student to teacher ratio: 11.07
- Color
- Athletics: No
- Mascot: Phoenix
- Nickname: NTO
- Website: nto.ectorcountyisd.org

George H.W. Bush New Tech Odessa, formerly known as New Tech Odessa, is the third high school in the Ector County Independent School District. It is the district's only high school to be entirely centered on a Project-Based Learning curriculum.

== History ==
New Tech Odessa opened in the fall of 2011, accepting a freshman and sophomore class of 120 students each. It continued adding a grade level every year until its first graduating class in the 2013-2014 school year.

== Clubs and activities ==
=== Academic Decathlon ===
New Tech Odessa has operated a United States Academic Decathlon team since the 2013-2014 school year. They compete annually in the West Texas regional in the small schools division. For the 2015-2016 academic year, the team advanced to the state tournament in the small schools division for the first time in school history.

=== Odyssey of the Mind ===
New Tech Odessa has been participating in the Odyssey of the Mind competition since 2014, sending a team to the world championships both years.

=== FIRST Robotics Competition ===
NTO has operated team #4301 in the FIRST Robotics Competition, nicknamed the New Tech Narcissists, since its first year in 2012. During the 2015 season, this team gained local recognition for receiving a sponsorship from the local branch of SM Energy, and went on to be an alliance captain in the quarterfinals of the 2015 Hub City Regional. During the 2016 competition season, the team won the Hub City regional as a member of the first seeded alliance and advanced to the World Championship.
