= Arno, Texas =

Ghost town in Texas, US

Arno
- Ghost town
- Location in Texas
- Coordinates: 31.6631852°N 103.6360152°W
- Country: United States
- State: Texas
- County: Reeves
- Elevation: 2,671 ft (814 m)

Arno is a ghost town in Reeves County, Texas, United States.

== History ==
Situated near the Pecos River and on Texas State Highway 302 and the Atchison, Topeka and Santa Fe Railway, Arno was settled in the early 20th century. A post office operated from 1907 to 1915, with Ola Solman serving as postmistress. At its peak in the 1930s, the population was 10 and it had one business, making it a rival to nearby Orla. Residents began to leave Arno in the 1940s, and the town was abandoned by the 1950s.
