= Arcade, Texas =

Unincorporated inhabited place in Texas, US

Coordinates: 31°48′10″N 102°26′45″W

Arcade is an unincorporated inhabited place in Ector County, Texas, United States. According to the Handbook of Texas, Arcade was shown on 1936 highway maps as a stop on the Texas and Pacific Railway (later the Missouri Pacific line) and still appears on Ector County maps today. No population statistics were available.
