= Goldsmith, Texas =

- City
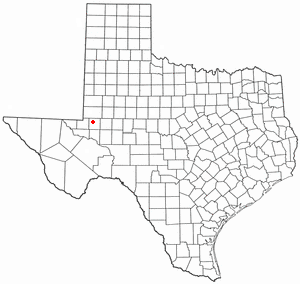
- Location of Goldsmith, Texas

- Coordinates: 31°58′57″N 102°36′57″W
- Country: United States
- State: Texas
- County: Ector

Area
  - Total: 0.32 sq mi (0.84 km^{2})
  - Land: 0.32 sq mi (0.84 km^{2})
  - Water: 0 sq mi (0.00 km^{2})
- Elevation: 3,140 ft (957 m)

Population (2020)
  - Total: 236
  - Density: 730/sq mi (280/km^{2})
- Time zone: UTC-6 (Central (CST))
  - Summer (DST): UTC-5 (CDT)
- ZIP code: 79741
- Area code: 432
- FIPS code: 48-30044
- GNIS feature ID: 1373868

Goldsmith is a city in Ector County, Texas, United States. The population was 236 at the 2020 census. It is part of the Odessa Metropolitan Statistical Area.

== Geography ==
Goldsmith is located in northwestern Ector County at 31°58′57″N 102°36′57″W (31.982441, –102.615714). Texas State Highway 158 passes through the community, leading east 11 miles (18 km) to U.S. Route 385 and southwest 4.5 miles (7.2 km) to Texas State Highway 302. The city of Odessa is 20 miles (32 km) southeast of Goldsmith.

According to the United States Census Bureau, Goldsmith has a total area of 0.3 square miles (0.8 km^{2}), all land.

== Demographics ==
Historical population
Census	Pop.	Note	%±
1960	670		—
1970	387		−42.2%
1980	409		5.7%
1990	297		−27.4%
2000	253		−14.8%
2010	257		1.6%
2020	236		−8.2%
U.S. Decennial Census; 2020 Census

=== 2020 census ===
As of the 2020 census, Goldsmith had a population of 236. The median age was 41.1 years. 24.2% of residents were under the age of 18 and 19.5% of residents were 65 years of age or older. For every 100 females there were 103.4 males; for every 100 females age 18 and over there were 108.1 males.

0.0% of residents lived in urban areas, while 100.0% lived in rural areas.

There were 98 households in Goldsmith, of which 31.6% had children under the age of 18 living in them. Of all households, 49.0% were married-couple households, 24.5% were households with a male householder and no spouse or partner present, and 15.3% were households with a female householder and no spouse or partner present. About 25.5% of all households were made up of individuals and 9.2% had someone living alone who was 65 years of age or older.

There were 128 housing units, of which 23.4% were vacant. The homeowner vacancy rate was 3.4% and the rental vacancy rate was 32.0%.

Racial composition as of the 2020 census
Race	Number	Percent
White	195	82.6%
Black or African American	5	2.1%
American Indian and Alaska Native	10	4.2%
Asian	0	0.0%
Native Hawaiian and Other Pacific Islander	0	0.0%
Some other race	2	0.8%
Two or more races	24	10.2%
Hispanic or Latino (of any race)	33	14.0%

=== 2000 census ===
As of the 2000 census, 253 people, 101 households, and 67 families resided in the city. The population density was 795.8 inhabitants per square mile (307.3/km^{2}). The 113 housing units averaged 355.4/sq mi (136.3/km^{2}). The racial makeup of the city was 88.14% White, 0.40% Native American, 9.09% from other races, and 2.37% from two or more races. Hispanics or Latinos of any race were 23.72% of the population.

Of the 101 households, 34.7% had children under the age of 18 living with them, 56.4% were married couples living together, 6.9% had a female householder with no husband present, and 32.7% were not families. About 29.7% of all households were made up of individuals, and 13.9% had someone living alone who was 65 years of age or older. The average household size was 2.50 and the average family size was 3.15.

In the city, the population was distributed as 28.1% under the age of 18, 10.7% from 18 to 24, 25.7% from 25 to 44, 19.4% from 45 to 64, and 16.2% who were 65 years of age or older. The median age was 38 years. For every 100 females, there were 110.8 males. For every 100 females age 18 and over, there were 100.0 males.

The median income for a household in the city was $38,125, and for a family was $47,321. Males had a median income of $32,000 versus $15,000 for females. The per capita income for the city was $17,237. About 7.9% of families and 13.8% of the population were below the poverty line, including 8.1% of those under the age of 18 and 28.3% of those 65 or over.

== Education ==
Goldsmith is served by the Ector County Independent School District.
