= Notrees, Texas =

- Unincorporated community
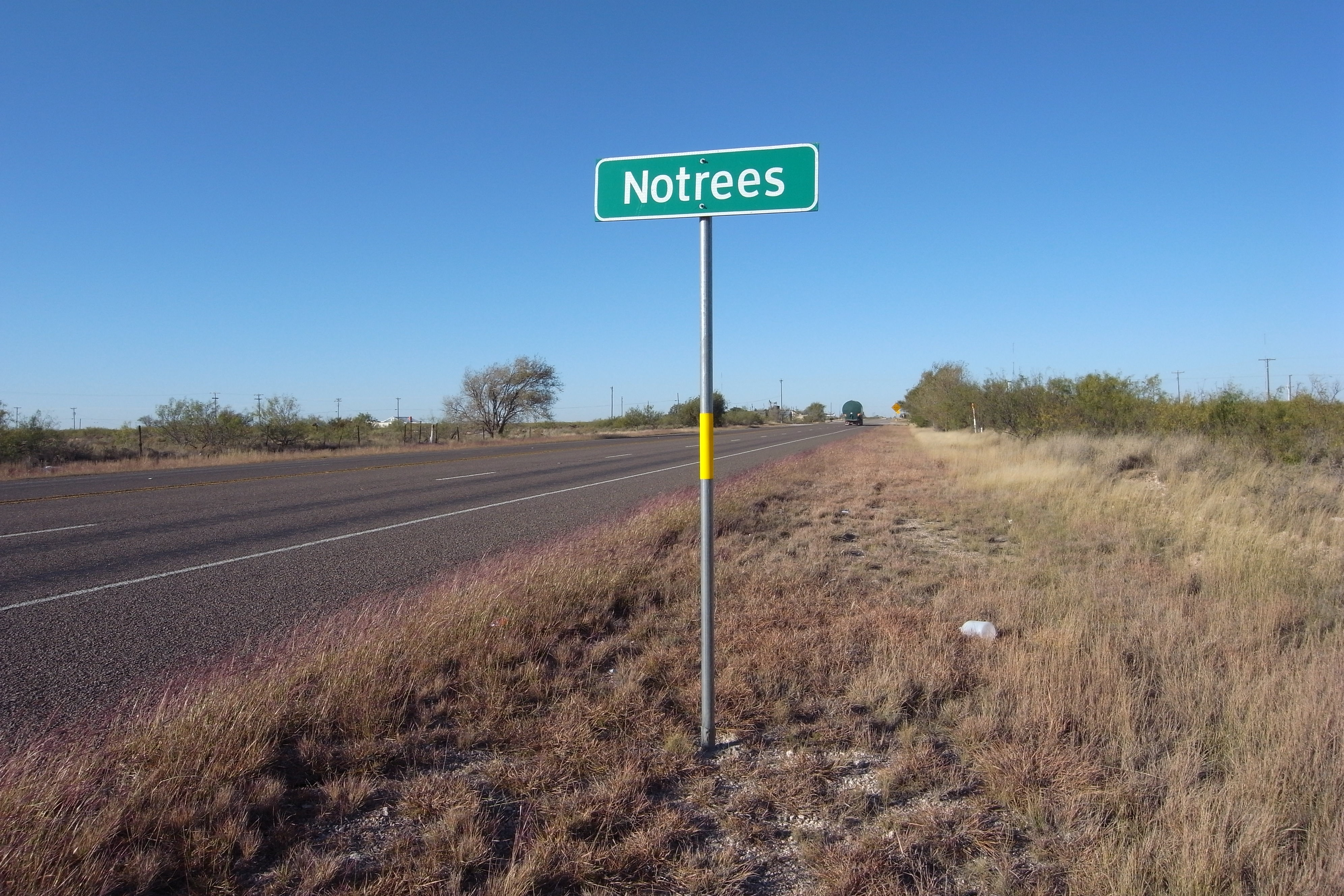

- Location within Texas Location within the United States
- Coordinates: 31°55′2″N 102°45′21″W
- Country: United States
- State: Texas
- County: Ector
- Region: West Texas
- Post office established: 1946
- Elevation: 3,333 ft (1,016 m)

Population (2010)
  - Total: 23
- Time zone: UTC-6 (CST)
- Postal code: 79759
- Area code: 432
- Website: Handbook of Texas: Notrees, Texas

Notrees is an unincorporated community in west-central Ector County, Texas, United States. It is located on State Highway 302, approximately 20 miles northwest of Odessa. The community is part of the Odessa metropolitan statistical area.

The area began to develop in the 1940s following the discovery of large oil fields, including the TXL Field. Notrees was known at various times as Caprock and Strawberry. Local merchant Charles E. Brown petitioned for a post office and selected the descriptive name of Notrees. Reportedly, the community had a single native tree before it was destroyed during the construction of a Shell Oil Company gas plant.

Notrees thrived during the 1950s and 1960s. In 1966, its population was 338 and the area was supported by several oil-company camps and a few businesses. The community began to decline by the 1980s as a result of oil companies abandoning the camps that once provided housing for employees and their families. An improved infrastructure enabled workers to live elsewhere (e.g., Odessa) and commute to Notrees. The community's small population currently supports four businesses.

The area has a 153 MW wind farm, connected to one of the world's largest grid energy storage systems and used mostly for electrical-grid frequency response. Lead-acid batteries, capable of delivering full power of 36 MW (48,000 hp) for 40 minutes, were used from 2012 to 2016. In 2017, they were replaced with lithium-ion batteries. Meanwhile, several higher-powered batteries have been installed elsewhere.

== See also ==
- Nowood River, Wyoming
