= Penwell, Texas =

Unincorporated community in Texas, US

Coordinates: 31°44′23″N 102°35′30″W

Penwell is an unincorporated community in Ector County, Texas, United States. It is located near Interstate 20, approximately sixteen miles southwest of Odessa. The community is part of the Odessa Metropolitan Statistical Area. Penwell is home to West Texas' only 1/4 mile drag strip.

Penwell was named after a well drilled in 1929 by independent oilman Robert R. Penn.

== Climate ==
This area has a large amount of sunshine year round due to its stable descending air and high pressure. According to the Köppen Climate Classification system, Penwell has a desert climate, abbreviated "Bwh" on climate maps.
