= Bainer, Texas =

Unincorporated community in Texas, US

Bainer
- Unincorporated community
- Location in Texas
- Coordinates: 33.8612041°N 102.2398974°W
- Country: United States
- State: Texas
- County: Lamb
- Elevation: 3,448 ft (1,051 m)

Bainer is an unincorporated community in Lamb County, Texas, United States.

Situated on U.S. Route 84, it was established on the Atchison, Topeka and Santa Fe Railway, as XIT Ranch's Yellowhouse Division, later Yellow House Ranch. After founding the Littlefield Lands Company, George W. Littlefield began selling land in the area in 1912. Before being called Bainer, the community was known as Yellow House Switch 1913 to the 1920s, because the Pecos and Northern Texas Railway placed a switch there when they built through. Primarily agricultural, it was a trade hub between Yellow House and Spade Ranch. As of 2000, it had 10 residents.
