= Odessa metropolitan area, Texas =

Metropolitan area in West Texas

Odessa, Texas Odessa, TX Metropolitan Statistical Area
- Metropolitan statistical area
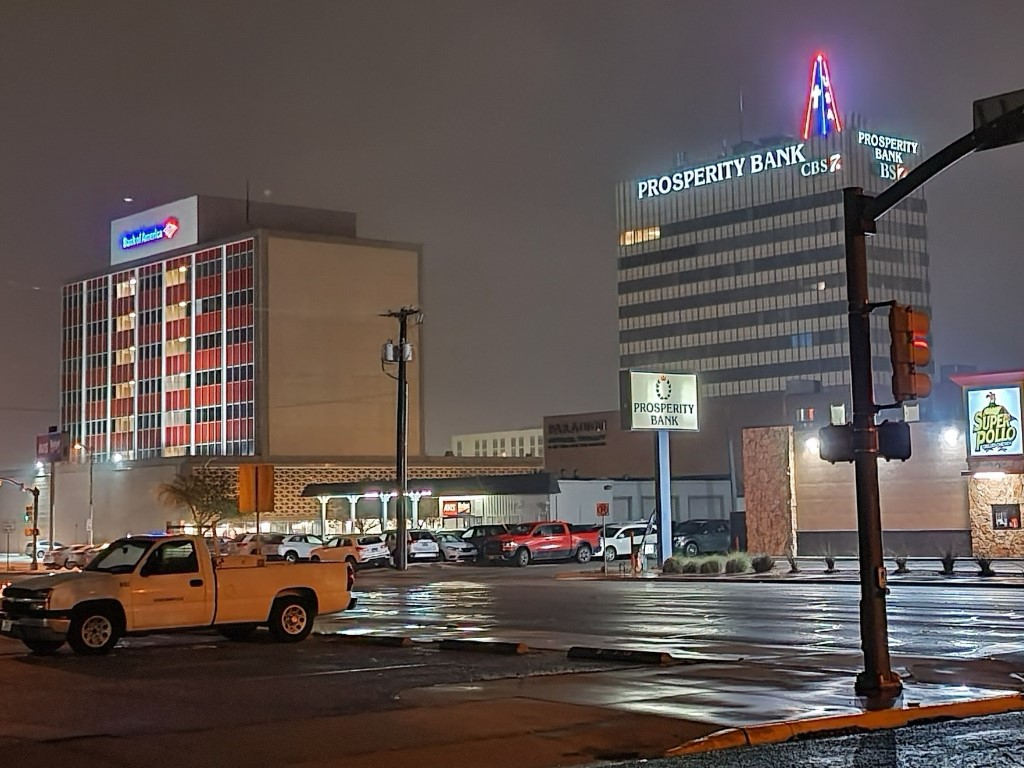
- Downtown Odessa, Texas in 2020
Midland–Odessa–Andrews, TX CSA
Midland MSA
Odessa MSA
Andrews µSA
City of Midland
City of Odessa
- Country: United States
- State: Texas
- Principal city: Odessa
- Time zone: UTC−6 (CST)
  - Summer (DST): UTC−5 (CDT)

The Odessa metropolitan statistical area, as defined by the United States Census Bureau, is an area consisting of one county, Ector, in West Texas, anchored by the city of Odessa. As of the 2020 census, the MSA had a population of 165,171.

The Odessa metropolitan area is also a component of the Midland–Odessa–Andrews Combined Statistical Area, which covers four counties (Midland, Ector, Andrews, and Martin) with a population of 365,590 as of 2023.

== Counties ==
- Ector

== Communities ==
- Gardendale (census-designated place)
- City of Goldsmith
- City of Odessa (partly in Midland County)
- West Odessa (census-designated place)
- Penwell (unincorporated)
- Pleasant Farms (unincorporated)
- Notrees (unincorporated)

== See also ==
- Texas census statistical areas
