= Gardendale, Texas =

- Census-designated place
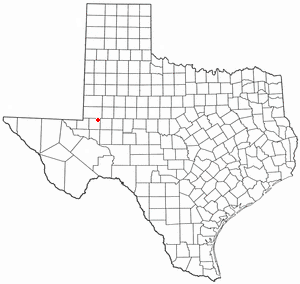
- Location of Gardendale, Texas

- Coordinates: 32°1′21″N 102°22′42″W
- Country: United States
- State: Texas
- County: Ector

Area
  - Total: 11.49 sq mi (29.75 km^{2})
  - Land: 11.47 sq mi (29.70 km^{2})
  - Water: 0.019 sq mi (0.05 km^{2})
- Elevation: 2,966 ft (904 m)

Population (2020)
  - Total: 2,020
  - Density: 176/sq mi (68.0/km^{2})
- Time zone: UTC-6 (Central (CST))
  - Summer (DST): UTC-5 (CDT)
- ZIP code: 79758
- Area code: 432
- FIPS code: 48-28200
- GNIS feature ID: 1373811

Gardendale is an unincorporated area and census-designated place (CDP) in Ector County, Texas, United States. The population was 2,020 at the 2020 census, up from 1,574 at the 2010 census. It is part of the Odessa, Texas, Metropolitan Statistical Area.

== Geography ==
Gardendale is located in northeastern Ector County at 32°1′21″N 102°22′42″W (32.022499, -102.378336). Texas State Highway 158 forms the northern edge of the community. Downtown Odessa is 14 miles (23 km) to the south.

According to the United States Census Bureau, the Gardendale CDP has a total area of 11.49 square miles (29.75 km^{2}), of which 0.02 square miles (0.05 km^{2}), or 0.16%, is water.

== Demographics ==
Historical population
Census	Pop.	Note	%±
1990	1,193		—
2000	1,197		0.3%
2010	1,574		31.5%
2020	2,020		28.3%
U.S. Decennial Census; 1850–1900 1910; 1920 1930 1940; 1950 1960 1970; 1980 1990 2000; 2010 2020

Gardendale first appeared as a census designated place in the 1990 U.S. census.

=== 2020 census ===
Gardendale CDP, Texas – Racial and ethnic composition Note: the US Census treats Hispanic/Latino as an ethnic category. This table excludes Latinos from the racial categories and assigns them to a separate category. Hispanics/Latinos may be of any race.
Race / Ethnicity (NH = Non-Hispanic)	Pop 2000	Pop 2010	Pop 2020	% 2000	% 2010	% 2020
White alone (NH)	1,010	1,323	1,324	84.38%	84.05%	65.54%
Black or African American alone (NH)	6	13	19	0.50%	0.83%	0.94%
Native American or Alaska Native alone (NH)	3	6	3	0.25%	0.38%	0.15%
Asian alone (NH)	3	2	8	0.25%	0.13%	0.40%
Native Hawaiian or Pacific Islander alone (NH)	0	2	0	0.00%	0.13%	0.00%
Other race alone (NH)	0	0	7	0.00%	0.00%	0.35%
Mixed race or Multiracial (NH)	7	7	61	0.58%	0.44%	3.02%
Hispanic or Latino (any race)	168	221	598	14.04%	14.04%	29.60%
Total	1,197	1,574	2,020	100.00%	100.00%	100.00%

=== 2000 census ===
As of the census of 2000, there were 1,197 people, 463 households, and 356 families residing in the CDP. The population density was 104.9 inhabitants per square mile (40.5/km^{2}). There were 519 housing units at an average density of 45.5 per square mile (17.6/km^{2}). The racial makeup of the CDP was 90.64% White, 0.50% African American, 0.67% Native American, 0.25% Asian, 6.68% from other races, and 1.25% from two or more races. Hispanic or Latino of any race were 14.04% of the population.

There were 463 households, out of which 34.1% had children under the age of 18 living with them, 67.6% were married couples living together, 5.6% had a female householder with no husband present, and 22.9% were non-families. 20.1% of all households were made up of individuals, and 7.6% had someone living alone who was 65 years of age or older. The average household size was 2.59 and the average family size was 2.98.

In the CDP, the population was spread out, with 24.8% under the age of 18, 8.6% from 18 to 24, 28.1% from 25 to 44, 26.9% from 45 to 64, and 11.6% who were 65 years of age or older. The median age was 39 years. For every 100 females, there were 106.0 males. For every 100 females age 18 and over, there were 107.4 males.

The median income for a household in the CDP was $50,069, and the median income for a family was $60,625. Males had a median income of $32,917 versus $25,758 for females. The per capita income for the CDP was $18,592. None of the families and 3.2% of the population were living below the poverty line, including no under eighteens and 4.4% of those over 64.

== Education ==
Gardendale is served by the Ector County Independent School District.

== Climate ==
According to the Köppen Climate Classification system, Gardendale has a semi-arid climate, abbreviated "BSk" on climate maps.
