= West Odessa, Texas =

- Census-designated place
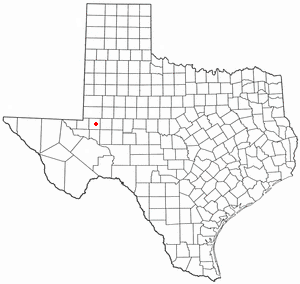
- Location of West Odessa, Texas

- Coordinates: 31°50′31″N 102°28′58″W
- Country: United States
- State: Texas
- County: Ector

Area
  - Total: 62.7 sq mi (162.5 km^{2})
  - Land: 62.7 sq mi (162.3 km^{2})
  - Water: 0.077 sq mi (0.2 km^{2})
- Elevation: 2,963 ft (903 m)

Population (2020)
  - Total: 33,340
  - Density: 532.0/sq mi (205.4/km^{2})
- Time zone: UTC-6 (Central (CST))
  - Summer (DST): UTC-5 (CDT)
- FIPS code: 48-77728
- GNIS feature ID: 1867572

West Odessa is an unincorporated community and census-designated place (CDP) in Ector County, Texas, United States, on the west side of the city of Odessa. As of the 2020 census, West Odessa had a population of 33,340. It is part of the Odessa metropolitan area.

== Geography ==
West Odessa is located at 31°50′31″N 102°28′58″W (31.841978, -102.482744), occupying the center of Ector County. It is bordered to the south by Interstate 20, to the north by Texas State Highway 302, to the west by FM 866, and to the east by the city of Odessa. Exits 104, 108, 112, and 113 from I-20 serve the community.

According to the United States Census Bureau, the CDP has a total area of 62.7 square miles (162.5 km^{2}), of which 62.7 square miles (162.3 km^{2}) are land and 0.08 square miles (0.2 km^{2}), or 0.15%, is covered by water.

== Demographics ==
Historical population
Census	Pop.	Note	%±
1990	16,566		—
2000	17,799		7.4%
2010	22,707		27.6%
2020	33,340		46.8%
U.S. Decennial Census; 1850–1900 1910; 1920 1930 1940; 1950 1960 1970; 1980 1990 2000; 2010

West Odessa was first listed as a census designated place in the 1990 U.S. census.

=== Racial and ethnic composition ===
West Odessa CDP, Texas – Racial and ethnic composition Note: the US Census treats Hispanic/Latino as an ethnic category. This table excludes Latinos from the racial categories and assigns them to a separate category. Hispanics/Latinos may be of any race.
Race / Ethnicity (NH = Non-Hispanic)	Pop 2000	Pop 2010	Pop 2020	% 2000	% 2010	% 2020
White alone (NH)	8,892	8,216	7,794	49.96%	36.18%	23.38%
Black or African American alone (NH)	109	162	287	0.61%	0.71%	0.86%
Native American or Alaska Native alone (NH)	87	114	83	0.49%	0.50%	0.25%
Asian alone (NH)	16	28	43	0.09%	0.12%	0.13%
Native Hawaiian or Pacific Islander alone (NH)	8	3	35	0.04%	0.01%	0.10%
Other race alone (NH)	2	14	81	0.01%	0.06%	0.24%
Mixed race or Multiracial (NH)	133	129	415	0.75%	0.57%	1.24%
Hispanic or Latino (any race)	8,552	14,041	24,602	48.05%	61.84%	73.79%
Total	17,799	22,707	33,340	100.00%	100.00%	100.00%

=== 2020 census ===
As of the 2020 census, there were 33,340 people and 5,422 families residing in the CDP. The median age was 30.9 years. 30.5% of residents were under the age of 18 and 8.6% of residents were 65 years of age or older. For every 100 females there were 107.5 males, and for every 100 females age 18 and over there were 107.0 males age 18 and over.

88.1% of residents lived in urban areas, while 11.9% lived in rural areas.

There were 10,556 households in West Odessa, of which 44.6% had children under the age of 18 living in them. Of all households, 54.1% were married-couple households, 21.3% were households with a male householder and no spouse or partner present, and 18.9% were households with a female householder and no spouse or partner present. About 19.9% of all households were made up of individuals and 5.7% had someone living alone who was 65 years of age or older.

There were 12,446 housing units, of which 15.2% were vacant. The homeowner vacancy rate was 0.9% and the rental vacancy rate was 24.7%.

Racial composition as of the 2020 census
Race	Number	Percent
White	14,578	43.7%
Black or African American	347	1.0%
American Indian and Alaska Native	287	0.9%
Asian	48	0.1%
Native Hawaiian and Other Pacific Islander	39	0.1%
Some other race	8,573	25.7%
Two or more races	9,468	28.4%
Hispanic or Latino (of any race)	24,602	73.8%

=== 2010 census ===
As of the census of 2010, there were 22,707 people, 5,742 households, and 4,656 families residing in the CDP. The population density was 285.0 inhabitants per square mile (110.0/km^{2}). There were 6,393 housing units at an average density of 102.4 per square mile (39.5/km^{2}). The racial makeup of the CDP was 71.64% White, 0.74% African American, 1.08% Native American, 0.09% Asian, 0.06% Pacific Islander, 23.88% from other races, and 2.51% from two or more races. Hispanic or Latino of any race were 48.05% of the population.

There were 5,742 households, out of which 45.0% had children under the age of 18 living with them, 65.7% were married couples living together, 10.4% had a female householder with no husband present, and 18.9% were non-families. 16.0% of all households were made up of individuals, and 5.5% had someone living alone who was 65 years of age or older. The average household size was 3.09 and the average family size was 3.46.

In the CDP, the population was spread out, with 33.1% under the age of 18, 10.0% from 18 to 24, 28.7% from 25 to 44, 20.5% from 45 to 64, and 7.7% who were 65 years of age or older. The median age was 30 years. For every 100 females, there were 99.6 males. For every 100 females age 18 and over, there were 97.8 males.

The median income for a household in the CDP was $31,277, and the median income for a family was $33,817. Males had a median income of $29,443 versus $19,450 for females. The per capita income for the CDP was $11,907. About 17.5% of families and 19.9% of the population were below the poverty line, including 24.6% of those under age 18 and 16.7% of those age 65 or over.

== Education ==
West Odessa is served by the Ector County Independent School District.
