= Ector County, Texas =

County in Texas, United States

- County
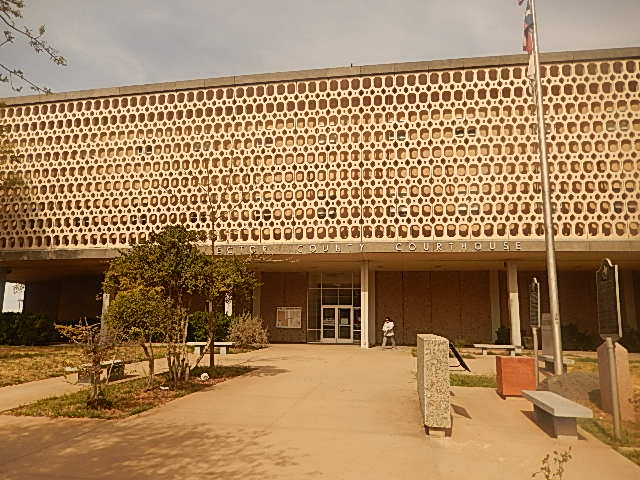
- Ector County Courthouse in Odessa

- Location within the U.S. state of Texas
- Coordinates: 31°52′N 102°32′W
- Country: United States
- State: Texas
- Founded: 1891
- Named for: Matthew Ector
- Seat: Odessa
- Largest city: Odessa

Area
  - Total: 902 sq mi (2,340 km^{2})
  - Land: 898 sq mi (2,330 km^{2})
  - Water: 4.1 sq mi (11 km^{2}) 0.5%

Population (2020)
  - Total: 165,171
  - Estimate (2025): 173,801 ▲
  - Density: 184/sq mi (71.0/km^{2})
- Time zone: UTC−6 (Central)
  - Summer (DST): UTC−5 (CDT)
- Congressional district: 11th
- Website: www.ectorcountytx.gov

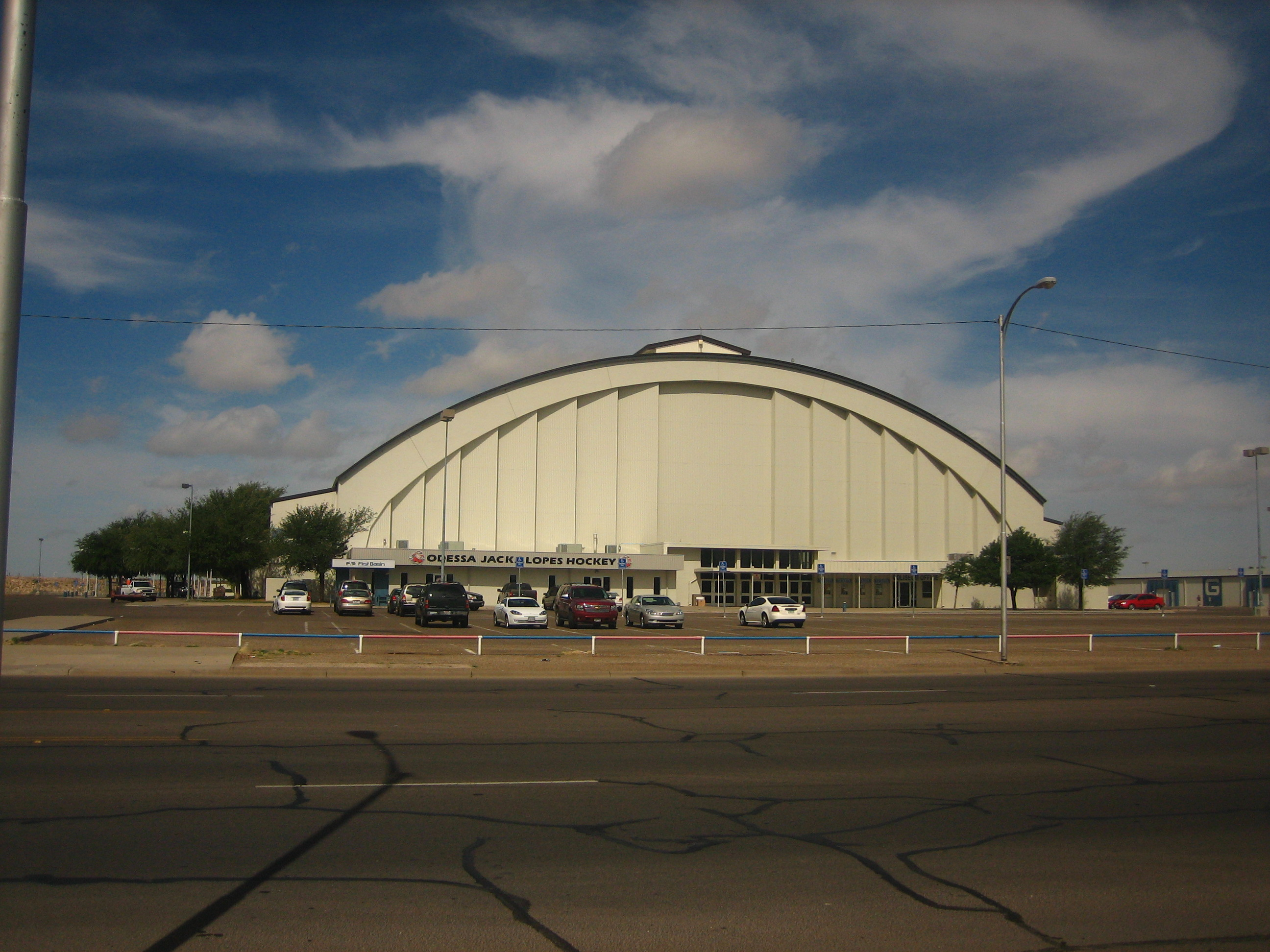
Ector County Coliseum

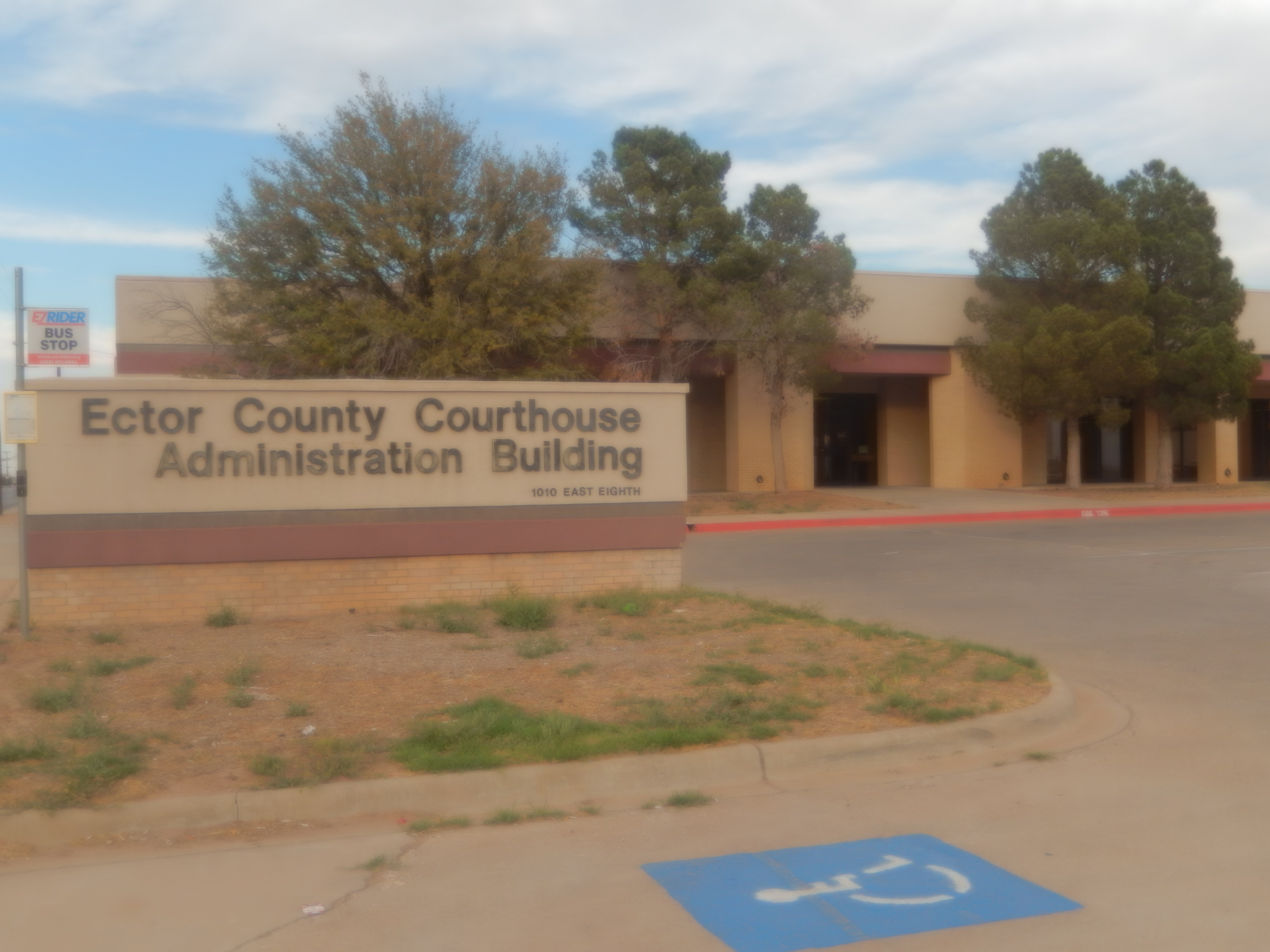
Ector County Courthouse Administration annex building

Ector County is a county located in the U.S. state of Texas. In the 2020 census, its population was 165,171. Its county seat is Odessa. The county was founded in 1887 and organized in 1891. It is named for Matthew Ector, a Confederate general in the American Civil War.

Ector County comprises the Odessa, Texas, metropolitan statistical area, which is included in the Midland–Odessa combined statistical area.

== Geography ==
According to the U.S. Census Bureau, the county has a total area of 902 sq mi (2,340 km^{2}), of which 898 sq mi (2,330 km^{2}) are land and 4.1 sq mi (11 km^{2}) (0.5%) are covered by water. Ector County has an average rainfall of about 14 in per year and a warm, sunny, semiarid climate. Most of the county is relatively flat, with small areas of slightly rolling terrain. The area is known for its stark landscape. The few naturally occurring trees are mostly mesquite trees, which more resemble large bushes.

=== Major highways ===
- I-20
- I-20 BL
- US 385
- SH 158
- SH 181
- SH 191
- SH 302
- Spur 450
- Spur 588
- Loop 338
- FM 554
- FM 1053
- FM 1601
- FM 1787
- FM 1788
- FM 1882
- FM 1936
- FM 2019
- FM 2020
- FM 3472
- FM 3503

=== Adjacent counties ===
- Andrews County (north)
- Midland County (east)
- Upton County (southeast)
- Crane County (south)
- Ward County (southwest)
- Winkler County (west)

== Demographics ==
Historical population
Census	Pop.	Note	%±
1890	224		—
1900	381		70.1%
1910	1,178		209.2%
1920	760		−35.5%
1930	3,958		420.8%
1940	15,051		280.3%
1950	42,102		179.7%
1960	90,995		116.1%
1970	91,805		0.9%
1980	115,374		25.7%
1990	118,934		3.1%
2000	121,123		1.8%
2010	137,130		13.2%
2020	165,171		20.4%
2025 (est.)	173,801	▲	5.2%
U.S. Decennial Census; 1850–2010 2010 2020

=== Racial and ethnic composition ===
Ector County, Texas – Racial and ethnic composition Note: the US Census treats Hispanic/Latino as an ethnic category. This table excludes Latinos from the racial categories and assigns them to a separate category. Hispanics/Latinos may be of any race.
Race / Ethnicity (NH = Non-Hispanic)	Pop 1980	Pop 1990	Pop 2000	Pop 2010	Pop 2020	% 1980	% 1990	% 2000	% 2010	% 2020
White alone (NH)	84,362	74,822	62,168	56,306	51,023	73.12%	62.91%	51.33%	41.06%	30.89%
Black or African American alone (NH)	5,027	5,391	5,370	5,596	7,430	4.36%	4.53%	4.43%	4.08%	4.50%
Native American or Alaska Native alone (NH)	535	542	526	623	568	0.46%	0.46%	0.43%	0.45%	0.34%
Asian alone (NH)	444	598	744	1,004	2,257	0.38%	0.50%	0.61%	0.73%	1.37%
Native Hawaiian or Pacific Islander alone (NH)	x	x	31	106	327	x	x	0.03%	0.08%	0.20%
Other race alone (NH)	175	266	29	68	492	0.15%	0.22%	0.02%	0.05%	0.30%
Mixed race or Multiracial (NH)	x	x	949	1,096	3,023	x	x	0.78%	0.80%	1.83%
Hispanic or Latino (any race)	24,831	37,315	51,306	72,331	100,051	21.52%	31.37%	42.36%	52.75%	60.57%
Total	115,374	118,934	121,123	137,130	165,171	100.00%	100.00%	100.00%	100.00%	100.00%

=== 2020 census ===
As of the 2020 census, the county had a population of 165,171. The median age was 32.8 years, with 27.7% of residents under the age of 18 and 10.8% of residents 65 years of age or older. For every 100 females there were 103.3 males, and for every 100 females age 18 and over there were 102.4 males age 18 and over.

The racial makeup of the county was 48.4% White, 4.9% Black or African American, 1.0% American Indian and Alaska Native, 1.4% Asian, 0.2% Native Hawaiian and Pacific Islander, 20.7% from some other race, and 23.4% from two or more races. Hispanic or Latino residents of any race comprised 60.6% of the population.

90.9% of residents lived in urban areas, while 9.1% lived in rural areas.

There were 57,336 households in the county, of which 39.6% had children under the age of 18 living in them. Of all households, 48.7% were married-couple households, 20.9% were households with a male householder and no spouse or partner present, and 23.6% were households with a female householder and no spouse or partner present. About 23.4% of all households were made up of individuals and 7.7% had someone living alone who was 65 years of age or older.

There were 66,086 housing units, of which 13.2% were vacant. Among occupied housing units, 67.6% were owner-occupied and 32.4% were renter-occupied. The homeowner vacancy rate was 1.7% and the rental vacancy rate was 21.3%.

=== 2000 census ===
As of the 2000 census, 121,123 people, 43,846 households, and 31,700 families resided in the county. The population density was 134 people per square mile (52 people/km^{2}). The 49,500 housing units averaged 55 units per square mile (21/km^{2}). The racial makeup of the county was 73.69% White, 4.61% African American, 0.83% Native American, 0.64% Asian, 0.04% Pacific Islander, 17.38% from other races, and 2.81% from two or more races. About 42.36% of the population was Hispanic or Latino of any race.

Of the 43,846 households, 38.90% had children under the age of 18 living with them, 54.10% were married couples living together, 13.70% had a female householder with no husband present, and 27.70% were not families. About 24.00% of all households was made up of individuals, and 8.90% had someone living alone who was 65 years of age or older. The average household size was 2.72 and the average family size was 3.25.

In the county, the population was distributed as 30.40% under the age of 18, 10.50% from 18 to 24, 27.90% from 25 to 44, 20.20% from 45 to 64, and 10.90% who were 65 years of age or older. The median age was 32 years. For every 100 females, there were 94.70 males. For every 100 females age 18 and over, there were 90.90 males.

The median income for a household in the county was $31,152, and for a family was $36,369. Males had a median income of $30,632 versus $21,317 for females. The per capita income for the county was $15,031. About 16.10% of families and 18.70% of the population were below the poverty line, including 23.90% of those under age 18 and 14.30% of those age 65 or over.

== Communities ==
=== Cities ===
- Goldsmith
- Odessa (county seat)

=== Census-designated places ===
- Gardendale
- West Odessa

=== Unincorporated communities ===
- Notrees
- Penwell
- Pleasant Farms

=== Ghost town ===
- Arcade

== Politics ==
Ector County is overwhelmingly Republican. It voted against Democrat Lyndon B. Johnson, a Texas native, in his 1964 landslide. The last time Democrats carried the county was in 1948.

United States presidential election results for Ector County, Texas
Year	Republican		Democratic		Third party(ies)	
Year	No.	%	No.	%	No.	%
1912	3	3.13%	89	92.71%	4	4.17%
1916	2	1.64%	120	98.36%	0	0.00%
1920	23	18.40%	100	80.00%	2	1.60%
1924	12	7.74%	138	89.03%	5	3.23%
1928	168	52.66%	151	47.34%	0	0.00%
1932	37	6.22%	530	89.08%	28	4.71%
1936	81	8.92%	816	89.87%	11	1.21%
1940	451	13.92%	2,783	85.92%	5	0.15%
1944	432	13.98%	2,265	73.28%	394	12.75%
1948	1,145	20.11%	4,305	75.61%	244	4.29%
1952	8,259	61.01%	5,270	38.93%	8	0.06%
1956	8,805	62.41%	5,109	36.21%	194	1.38%
1960	11,145	53.91%	8,996	43.52%	531	2.57%
1964	11,497	51.36%	10,826	48.36%	63	0.28%
1968	10,557	43.02%	5,312	21.65%	8,671	35.33%
1972	21,386	79.32%	5,449	20.21%	125	0.46%
1976	18,973	62.56%	10,802	35.62%	553	1.82%
1980	26,188	72.38%	9,069	25.07%	922	2.55%
1984	31,228	77.41%	8,913	22.09%	201	0.50%
1988	23,155	67.80%	10,825	31.70%	172	0.50%
1992	18,161	50.35%	11,130	30.85%	6,782	18.80%
1996	17,746	54.29%	12,017	36.76%	2,923	8.94%
2000	22,893	69.58%	9,425	28.65%	583	1.77%
2004	27,502	75.74%	8,579	23.63%	229	0.63%
2008	26,199	73.49%	9,123	25.59%	329	0.92%
2012	24,010	73.85%	8,118	24.97%	385	1.18%
2016	25,020	68.49%	10,249	28.06%	1,261	3.45%
2020	32,697	73.33%	11,367	25.49%	527	1.18%
2024	32,429	76.10%	9,881	23.19%	305	0.72%

United States Senate election results for Ector County, Texas1
Year	Republican		Democratic		Third party(ies)	
Year	No.	%	No.	%	No.	%
2024	30,729	72.70%	10,620	25.13%	919	2.17%

United States Senate election results for Ector County, Texas2
Year	Republican		Democratic		Third party(ies)	
Year	No.	%	No.	%	No.	%
2020	31,711	72.78%	10,682	24.52%	1,179	2.71%

Texas Gubernatorial election results for Ector County
Year	Republican		Democratic		Third party(ies)	
Year	No.	%	No.	%	No.	%
2022	19,212	75.49%	5,950	23.38%	287	1.13%

== See also ==
- List of museums in West Texas
- National Register of Historic Places listings in Ector County, Texas
- Recorded Texas Historic Landmarks in Ector County
- Odessa College
- Presidential Museum and Leadership Library
- University of Texas of the Permian Basin
- Odessa Meteor Crater
