= KHKX =

Radio station in Odessa–Midland, Texas

Coordinates: 32.053°N 102.295°W

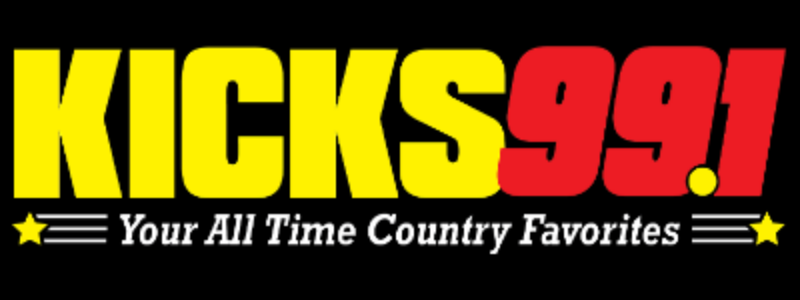

Odessa, Texas; United States
- Broadcast area: Midland-Odessa
- Frequency: 99.1 MHz
- Branding: Kicks 99.1

Programming
- Format: Country
- Affiliations: Compass Media Networks

Ownership
- Owner: Brazos Communications West, LLC
- Sister stations: KMCM, KQRX

History
- First air date: 2001
- Former call signs: KKKK (1977–1998); KLVW (1998–2001); KWBI (2001)
- Call sign meaning: KHKX = Kicks

Technical information
- Licensing authority: FCC
- Facility ID: 67368
- Class: C1
- ERP: 100,000 watts

Links
- Public license information: Public file; LMS
- Webcast: Listen Live
- Website: kicks99.net

KHKX (99.1 FM), branded as "Kicks 99 Country", is a radio station that serves the Midland–Odessa metropolitan area with country music and live high school football for Odessa High School and Permian High School. They are a former affiliate for the Dallas Cowboys and broadcast the #1 rated country morning show in the Midland-Odessa area with Mike and Dana.

Its studios are located at the West Texas Radio Group Building on Midkiff Road in Midland, south of Midland Park Mall, and its transmitter is located in Gardendale, Texas.

== History ==
KHKX is fairly new to the Odessa-Midland area, having been established in 2001. In an effort to attract listeners to their network, they managed to sign Mike and Dana from rival Cumulus Station KGEE. When KCRS-FM came under new ownership in Premiere Radio Networks in 1997, they announced they would discontinue broadcasting live high school football games on the FM frequency and instead focus all sports on KCRS (AM). After six months of searching, the Ector County Independent School District was able to announce KHKX had picked up the rights to broadcast high school football and would bring the team over from KCRS-FM that had broadcast football for 8 years. They also managed to acquire the Dallas Cowboys Radio Network from 2000–2006. The increased money from these new sponsors eventually allowed them to acquire KMCM from Music City Mall, allowing them to monopolize the live football broadcasts for the Odessa games, and 95X, which they re-branded as Bob FM and picked up the rights for Midland Christian High School football games.
