= KCRS =

KCRS may refer to:

- KCRS (AM), a radio station (550 AM) licensed to Midland, Texas, United States
- KCRS-FM, a radio station (103.3 FM) licensed to Midland, Texas, United States
