= KFLB =

Family Life Radio station in Odessa, Texas

KFLB-FM
- Stanton, Texas; United States
- Broadcast area: Midland–Odessa
- Frequency: 88.1 MHz

Programming
- Format: Christian
- Network: Family Life Radio

Ownership
- Owner: Family Life Broadcasting

History
- First air date: 2002
- Former call signs: KFRI (2002–2009); KLVW (2009)
- Call sign meaning: "Family Life Broadcasting"

Technical information
- Licensing authority: FCC
- Facility ID: 92993
- Class: C1
- ERP: 100,000 watts
- HAAT: 139.3 meters (457 ft)
- Transmitter coordinates: 32°5′44″N 101°48′47″W

Links
- Public license information: Public file; LMS

Former simulcast
- KFLB
- Odessa, Texas; United States
- Frequency: 920 kHz

Ownership
- Owner: Family Life Broadcasting

History
- First air date: January 26, 1947
- Last air date: July 17, 2023
- Former call signs: KECK (1947–1967); KBZB (1967–1976); KYXX (1976–1987); KENT (1987–2001)

Technical information
- Facility ID: 39900
- Class: B
- Power: 1,000 watts (day); 500 watts (night)
- Transmitter coordinates: 31°49′14″N 102°25′42″W

KFLB-FM (88.1 FM) is a non-commercial radio station licensed to Stanton, Texas, United States, that features a Christian radio format as an affiliate of Family Life Radio. Owned by Family Life Broadcasting, the station serves the Midland–Odessa metropolitan area.

KFLB (920 AM) was also owned by Family Life Broadcasting and carried the same programming as a direct simulcast of KFLB-FM until its license was surrendered and cancelled on July 17, 2023.

== History ==
=== KECK, KBZB and KYXX ===
KECK went on the air at noon on January 26, 1947. It was owned by Ben Nedow's Ector County Broadcasting Company and broadcast as a daytime-only station with 1,000 watts, adding 500-watt nighttime service in 1950. KECK brought NBC programs to Odessa and was the second new station for the city in as many Sundays (KOSA had gone on the air on January 19). The Nedows owned the station until 1965, three years after Ben's death, when High Sky Broadcasters acquired the frequency. High Sky changed KECK's call sign to KBZB on April 10, 1967.

KBZB was sold in 1968 to the Atkins and Green Broadcasting Company, formed by two Odessa businessmen. Mesa Broadcasting, owned by Randy Wayne of Brownwood, acquired the station in 1976 for $260,000 and relaunched it as KYXX with a country format. KYXX and sister station KKYN in Plainview were sold to Keith Adams and Jim Shelton of Amarillo in 1979. The format flip helped vault KYXX to the top of the Permian Basin radio ratings, where in 1981 it had a market share of 16.5 percent, but in 1982 it was supplanted by KUFO, an FM station.

=== KENT ===
In 1986, Adams-Shelton sold KYXX to the Southwest Educational Media Foundation of Texas (SEMFOT), which took control on January 1, 1987. The new ownership, headed by a T. Kent Atkins, changed the call sign to KENT and instituted a middle-of-the-road Christian music format, augmented by syndicated programs from James Dobson, J. Vernon McGee, Warren Wiersbee and others; the station operated noncommercially, seeking support from listeners. Two years later, KENT acquired the construction permit for noncommercial station KOFR at 90.5 MHz, which was owned by Family Radio, and brought it to air as KENT-FM, a simulcast of the AM station.

The signing on of KENT-FM and co-owned FM radio stations in Amarillo and Lubbock, however, would turn into a years-long legal headache for SEMFOT. Three years of investigation turned serious when the Federal Communications Commission asked its administrative law judge to impose the maximum $250,000 fine, citing a record of false information provided to the FCC and saying that KENT-FM, Amarillo's KLMN (now K-LOVE transmitter KXLV) and Lubbock's KAMY (now a Family Life Radio transmitter) were built and operated without FCC authorization. The FCC also designated all SEMFOT stations' licenses for hearing. That April, SEMFOT decided to sell all of its stations to Maranatha Radio for $600,000 in a minority distress sale.

Maranatha sold six stations in Texas and Lake Charles, Louisiana, all former SEMFOT properties, to Family Life Radio in 1998 for $1 million. KENT and KENT-FM became KFLB and KFLB-FM in 2001.

In 2009, Family Life Radio and the Educational Media Foundation engaged in a facility swap in which the original Family Life station, 90.5 FM, was traded to EMF for its 88.1 FM facility, then known as KFRI with the Air 1 network, and $175,000 in cash. On June 19, the KFLB-FM call sign relocated to 88.1 MHz; 90.5 became K-LOVE transmitter KLVW, which had been on EMF's 88.7 frequency.

KFLB continued to directly simulcast the new KFLB-FM until falling silent on October 14, 2022, due to prolonged issues at the transmitter site and insufficient funds to conduct repairs. On July 17, 2023, Family Life Broadcasting surrendered the AM station's license for cancellation.

== Translators ==
KFLB-FM has translators serving Odessa and Big Spring.

Broadcast translators for KFLB-FM
Call sign	Frequency	City of license	FID	ERP (W)	HAAT	Class	Transmitter coordinates	FCC info
K269FG	101.7 FM	Odessa	148509	250	113.2 m (371 ft)	D	31°51′45″N 102°25′0″W	LMS
K298BN	107.5 FM	Big Spring	155684	115	172 m (564 ft)	D	32°13′17.76″N 101°27′33.35″W	LMS
