= KQRX =

- Midland, Texas; United States
- Broadcast area: Midland-Odessa
- Frequency: 95.1 MHz
- Branding: 95X

Programming
- Format: Alternative rock
- Affiliations: Compass Media Networks

Ownership
- Owner: Brazos Communications West, LLC
- Sister stations: KMCM, KHKX

History
- First air date: 1995

Technical information
- Licensing authority: FCC
- Facility ID: 67026
- Class: C
- ERP: 10,500 watts
- HAAT: 854.0 meters (2,801.8 ft)
- Transmitter coordinates: 34°13′52″N 77°57′18″W

Links
- Public license information: Public file; LMS
- Webcast: Listen Live
- Website: 95xlive.com

KQRX (95.1 FM, "95X") is a commercial radio station located in Midland, Texas, broadcasting to the Midland-Odessa market. KQRX airs an alternative rock music format. Its studios are located at the West Texas Radio Group Building on Midkiff Road in Midland, south of Midland Park Mall, and its transmitter is located in Gardendale, Texas.

== History ==
KQRX signed on in 1995 airing a modern rock music format branded as "The X". They carried the ESPN Radio show EXPN as one of their signature shows. The station's branding eventually evolved, becoming "95X - The New Music Alternative". On March 8, 2007, KQRX was bought by the West Texas Radio Group. They decided to drop the modern rock music format in favor of an adult hits music format. They re-branded it as "Bob FM" and had it join the national stations that carry Bob FM. That fall, KQRX also began broadcasting live high school football coverage for the Midland Christian High School Mustangs. In 2009, Bob FM took over the post-season rights for Midland College athletics from KMND. In 2009 they broadcast some Odessa Roughnecks games when Odessa Jackalopes playoffs games were scheduled to be broadcast at the same time on sister station KMCM, but they took over the full broadcasting contract for the 2010 season and beyond. In 2011 KQRX stopped broadcasting the Midland Christian Mustangs. In 2012 they stopped broadcasting the West Texas Roughnecks games.

On September 13, 2012, KQRX changed their format from adult hits (as "Bob FM") to active rock, branded as "Rock 95.1".

In March 2023, KQRX rebranded back to "95X" and returned to the alternative rock format.
