= KMND =

Radio station in Midland, Texas

Coordinates: 31°57′49″N 102°04′53″W

- Midland, Texas; United States
- Broadcast area: Midland-Odessa
- Frequency: 1510 kHz
- Branding: Fox Sports 1510

Programming
- Format: Sports
- Affiliations: Fox Sports Radio

Ownership
- Owner: Townsquare Media; (Townsquare License, LLC)
- Sister stations: KBAT, KNFM, KODM, KRIL, KZBT

History
- First air date: 1958
- Call sign meaning: MidlaND

Technical information
- Licensing authority: FCC
- Facility ID: 28201
- Class: D
- Power: 2,400 watts day
- Translator: 99.5 K258AO (Midland)

Links
- Public license information: Public file; LMS
- Webcast: Listen Live
- Website: foxsports1510.com

KMND (1510 AM), branded as "Fox Sports 1510 KMND", is a radio station that serves the Midland–Odessa metropolitan area with Fox Sports Radio talk shows, the WinningEDGE radio show, and a weekly sports update on Pro Football and Basketball. It also simulcasts the programming on 99.5 FM. 1510 AM is under ownership of Townsquare Media. 99.5 FM is owned by Eastern New Mexico University under a LMA to Townsquare Media.

Its studios are located on Highway 191 just west of Midland (its city of license) in rural Midland County and its transmitter is located south of Midland.

1510 AM is a United States clear-channel frequency; KMND must leave the air during the period from sunset to sunrise in order the protect the nighttime skywave signal of WLAC in Nashville, Tennessee.

1510 AM signed on in Midland in 1958. It began as a 500-watt daytimer called KABH. Over its early years it was a middle of road station. Partners in cross town KNFM acquired an interest in KABH and the letters were changed to KNAM. About 1979 the station changed owners, relocated its office, and changed calls to KMND for "Command".

As an affiliate of the Dallas Cowboys, KMND carried the Wade Phillips show and the Dallas Cowboys daily report, but they did not have the contract to air the games. Sister station KGEE/KNFM aired the Cowboys games in the Odessa-Midland area. As an affiliate of ESPN Radio, the station carried commercials for the ESPN Radio College Football Game of the Week, the BCS on ESPN Radio, the NIT on ESPN Radio, and Major League Baseball on ESPN Radio, but the station only aired college bowl games that were sold as part of ESPN Radio coverage nationwide. In 2009 they ended up adding the full broadcast schedule beginning with the NBA on ESPN Radio and then continuing into Major League Baseball on ESPN Radio. They also carried live coverage of the Midland High Bulldogs and the Midland Lee Rebels post-season play for all sports except football. The station doesn't produce any local shows, but in the past they produced Sportstalk with Robbie Burns which aired weekdays from 3-6 PM and Saturday from 10 AM-Noon. They also aired coverage of post-season sports for the Midland College Chaparalls from 2004–2008. In 2009 those rights moved to KQRX.

Before becoming an ESPN Radio affiliate, KMND specialized in talk radio shows now found on KCRS (AM), including Rush Limbaugh, and tejano music.

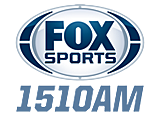
Logo before translator sign on

In March 2017 KMND moved from ESPN Radio to Fox Sports Radio.

== Local shows the station previously produced ==
- SportsTalk With Robbie Burns

== Live sports KMND has broadcast ==
- Cotton Bowl Classic (1998–2002)
- Sun Bowl (1998–2002)
- NFL on Westwood One (1998–2002)
- Texas Longhorns football (1998–2006)
- TCU Horned Frogs football (1998–2006)
- Texas Tech Lady Raider Basketball (1998–2006)
- Motor Racing Network (1998–2006)
- 2007 New Mexico Bowl
- 2007 Hawaii Bowl
- 2007 Chick-fil-A Bowl
- 2008 Outback Bowl
- 2008 Hawaii Bowl
- 2008 Chick-fil-A Bowl
- 2009 Hawaii Bowl
- 2009 Outback Bowl
- 2009 Rose Bowl
- 2009 Liberty Bowl
- (after the All-Star Break) 2009 NBA on ESPN Radio
- 2009 World Baseball Classic Semi-finals and Championship game
- 2009 Major League Baseball on ESPN Radio night games
- 2010 Major League Baseball on ESPN Radio night games
