= KMCM =

Radio station in Odessa, Texas

Coordinates: 32.086°N 102.287°W

- Odessa, Texas; United States
- Broadcast area: Midland-Odessa
- Frequency: 96.9 MHz
- Branding: KMCM 97 Gold

Programming
- Format: Classic hits
- Affiliations: Classic Hits (Westwood One)

Ownership
- Owner: Brazos Communications West, LLC
- Sister stations: KHKX; KQRX

History
- First air date: 1961 (as KQIP)
- Former call signs: KQIP (1961–1997)
- Call sign meaning: Music City Mall

Technical information
- Licensing authority: FCC
- Facility ID: 65306
- Class: C1
- ERP: 100,000 watts
- HAAT: 137.7 meters (452 ft)

Links
- Public license information: Public file; LMS
- Webcast: Listen live
- Website: 97gold.com

KMCM (96.9 FM), branded as "KMCM 97 Gold", is a radio station that serves the Midland–Odessa metropolitan area with classic hits by broadcasting the Classic Hits satellite feed from Westwood One. Its studios are located at the West Texas Radio Group Building on Midkiff Road in Midland, south of Midland Park Mall, and its transmitter is located in Gardendale, Texas.

Previously they provided the most live sports in West Texas with high school football for Odessa High School and Permian High School, rotating them each week with sister station KHKX, Central Hockey League games of the Odessa Jackalopes, the Indoor Football League Odessa Roughnecks, and NCAA Texas Tech Red Raiders football and basketball games, which they got from KCRS (AM), and Houston Texans football. During the 2007 season they let go of the Texans rights, in 2009 KFZX acquired the Odessa Jackalopes contract from them also transferring the Monday talk show Hockey Talk, and in 2010 the Roughnecks games were transferred fully to sister station KQRX, leaving only High School Football and Texas Tech sports on KMCM.
