= KOYL =

Radio station in Odessa, Texas (1957–1991)

Coordinates: 31°52′34″N 102°24′18″W

- Odessa, Texas; United States
- Broadcast area: Midland-Odessa
- Frequency: 1310 kHz

Programming
- Format: Tejano

Ownership
- Owner: Pete C. Rodriquez

History
- First air date: September 7, 1957
- Last air date: 1991
- Call sign meaning: Similar to "oil"

Technical information
- Facility ID: 52349
- Class: D
- Power: 1,000 watts (day); 79 watts (night)

KOYL (1310 AM) was a radio station in Odessa, Texas, that served the Midland–Odessa metropolitan area. It was the first country music station in the area. KOYL's air staff as a country music station has included Bill Myrick. It went silent in March 1991.

== History ==
The Mid-Cities Broadcasting Co., owned by Edward and Lowell Roskelley, received the construction permit for KPBX on September 19, 1956. Before going on the air September 7, 1957, the station was given call letters KOYL, a nod to the importance of oil in the Permian Basin economy. A 1981 Book of Texas Lists would feature KOYL and fellow Odessa station KRIG, both named for the oil industry.

KOYL became the first country music station in the area, broadcasting with 500 watts (later increased to 1,000). It also was the first new radio station in Odessa in a decade.

KOYL's air staff as a country music station over the years included Bill Myrick, and guest disc jockeys Waylon Jennings and Johnny Dollar. Jennings and Dollar would continue to appear on KOYL after leaving the station as part of its regular "Voice of the Past" feature, hosted by former station DJs. Edward Roskelley also hosted the station's morning show as "Ross the Boss" for the 22 years he owned the station. On April 5, 1966, KOYL-FM signed on the air, offering separate programming and country music at night when KOYL was off the air.

In 1979, Roskelley sold KOYL-AM-FM to Stream Broadcasting of Texas, Inc. Stream added nighttime service to KOYL, broadcasting with 79 watts. In March 1980, Stream split the FM station off as contemporary outlet KUFO-FM; it is now KODM.

The second—and final—sale of KOYL occurred in 1985, to Pete C. Rodriquez, as Stream sold the AM and FM stations separately. Rodriquez, the owner of Odessa's Pan American Ballroom, immediately changed KOYL to a Spanish-language format. One of the reasons Rodriquez bought KOYL was because the existing Spanish-language station in town, KJJT, was co-owned with a competing venue and tended to ignore entertainers performing at the Pan American. KOYL also relocated its studios after the sale. The sale, however, prompted a concern from the Associated Press, which in 1989 sued Stream Broadcasting for terminating its AP wire service contract for KOYL right before selling the station without notifying Rodriquez; the AP sought $23,525 in back payments. KOYL's license was eventually canceled in 1992 after the station was reported silent in March 1991 and its silent status was reaffirmed by the National Association of Broadcasters in a May 29, 1992 letter to the FCC on media ownership rules.
