= Momentum Bank Ballpark =

Ballpark in Midland, Texas, US

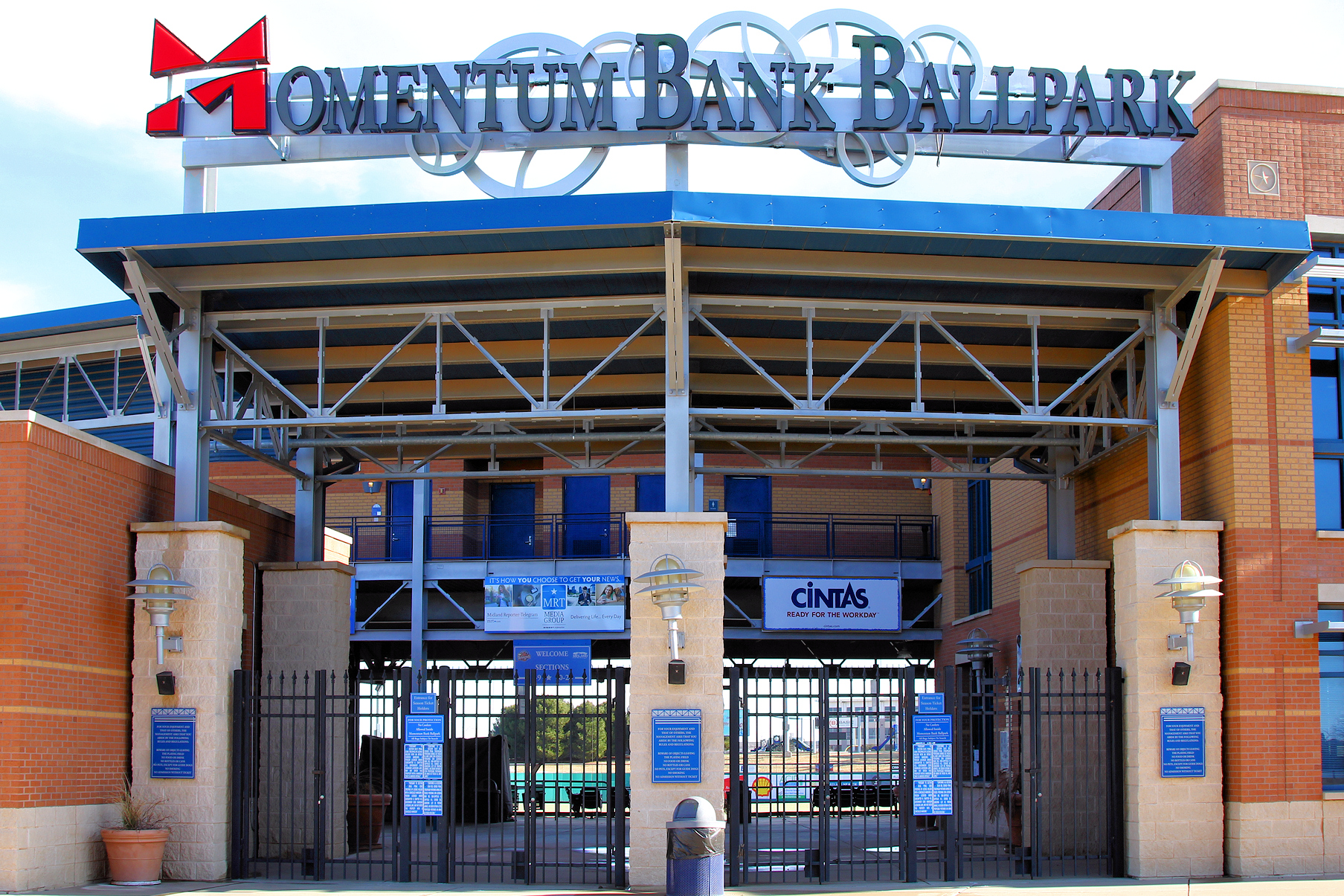

- Location within Texas Location within the United States
- Interactive map of Momentum Bank Ballpark
- Former names: First American Bank Ballpark; Citibank Ballpark; Security Bank Ballpark
- Address: 5514 Champions Drive; Midland, Texas; United States
- Coordinates: 31.987332°N 102.155799°W
- Owner: City of Midland
- Operator: Midland Sports Inc.
- Capacity: 4,709 (fixed seating); 6,669 (plus berm seating)
- Surface: Latitude 36 Bermuda
- Field size: Left Field: 330 feet (100 m); Center Field: 410 feet (120 m); Right Field: 322 feet (98 m)

Construction
- Groundbreaking: May 19, 2001
- Opened: March 23, 2002
- Cost: $23 million ($41.2 million in 2025 dollars)
- Architects: Populous; Parkhill, Smith & Cooper
- General contractors: MW Builders, Inc.

Tenant
- Midland RockHounds (TL) 2002–present

Website
- www.milb.com/midland/ballpark

Momentum Bank Ballpark (formerly First American Bank Ballpark, Citibank Ballpark, and Security Bank Ballpark) is a ballpark in Midland, Texas. It is primarily used for baseball, and is the home field of the Double-A Midland RockHounds minor league baseball team of the Texas League. Opened in 2002, the stadium holds 6,669 people with 4,709 fixed seats and the rest in berm seating.

== History ==
The first game at Momentum Bank Ballpark was played in 2002. It was named the "Best New Park of 2002" by BaseballParks.com. Momentum Bank Ballpark was originally known as First American Bank Ballpark, but the name was changed in 2005 after Citibank acquired First American Bank of Bryan, Texas. In 2014, the ballpark was again renamed to Security Bank Ballpark. It became Momentum Bank Ballpark in 2020. The ballpark replaced the old Christensen Stadium, the former home of the RockHounds.

== Features ==
- The stadium seats 4,709 people, with grass berm areas adding substantially to the overall capacity of 6,669.
- 22 luxury suites, which are named after players whom spent some time seasoning (or rehabbing) in Midland, are available for rental. Another suite is named for former U.S. President George W. Bush who was raised in Midland.
- The ProPetro Diamond Club, which hosts media luncheons for the RockHounds, Sockers, City of Midland, and other outside companies that rent the facility, is located at the back of the concourse behind home plate. Open to suite and pass holders, the Diamond Club has a sizable dining room with a high ceiling within which food is served buffet style from a serving station.
