= Sakowitz =

Former department store chain

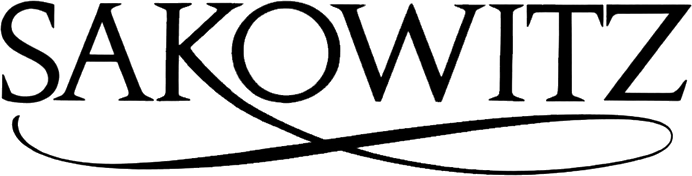

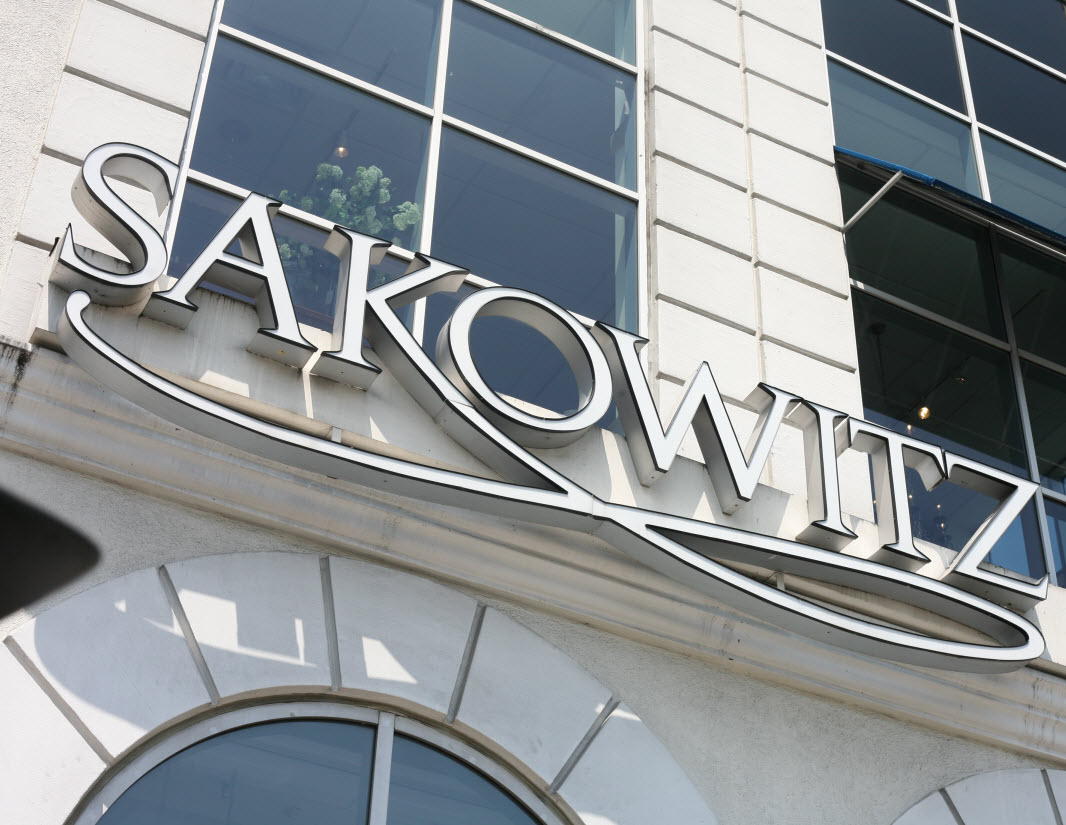
- Type: department store (former)
- Industry: retail
- Founded: 1902; 124 years ago
- Founder: Tobias & Simon Sakowitz
- Defunct: 1990; 36 years ago
- Headquarters: Houston, Texas, United States
- Area served: Primarily Texas, some presence in Arizona, Oklahoma, Ohio
- Products: clothing, footwear, furniture, jewelry, beauty products, furs

Sakowitz was a men's clothing store which grew into a small chain of family-owned high-end department stores based in Houston, Texas. It operated from 1902 until 1990. Sakowitz was responsible for launching many of the now-famous European fashion designers in America - among them Andre' Courreges, Yves St. Laurent Rive Gauche, Zandra Rhoades, Givenchy, and Erminegildo Zegna. The Sakowitz catalogues were mailed to all fifty states and abroad.

== History ==
=== Origins ===
Leebe Shaikovich, was an Ashkenazi Jewish man from Korostyshiv, Volhynia, today part of Ukraine, but at that time part of the Russian Empire. He emigrated to the U.S. in 1886, where his name was changed upon arrival to Louis Sakowitz. In Galveston, Texas, Louis began a peddler business, taking orders and delivering clothes on a bicycle to the many merchant seamen. Then, he and his son Samuel opened a small store near the wharves, while brothers Simon and Tobias worked elsewhere around town, for the time being. But in 1902 they opened the Sakowitz Brothers gentlemen's haberdashery in Galveston at 2113 Market Street, then expanded into booming Houston in 1911 at 308 Main Street, which Simon ran while Tobias ran the then-larger Galveston operation. The location in Galveston was closed in 1917 and consolidated into the Houston store.

=== Downtown Houston flagship ===
By 1929, the original Houston store on 308 Main Street had relocated to the Gulf Building at 720 Main Street by noted Houston architect Alfred C. Finn.

In 1951, Sakowitz moved again to a five story, modernist store at 1111 Main Street (Dallas and Main) also designed by Finn. This was the first time that Sakowitz truly "ran a department store", as it now directly managed the women's (and several other) departments, which prior to then had been franchised to other operators.

The store, whose exterior has been kept but whose interior has been turned into a parking garage, contained:

- 8,073 feet of polished and antique mirrors
- 10,872 incandescent and fluorescent lamps
- 32 public telephones
- 205 store telephones
- 254,000 sq ft (23,597 m^{2}) of space
- The landmark Sky Terrace restaurant
- 2 “Red Reminder” phones. Phones at the store’s entrances that can be used to call any department in case a patron overlooked an item while shopping.

=== Expansion ===
In 1956, Sakowitz opened its first suburban location at Gulfgate Mall.

In 1959, a large, 187,000 sq ft (17,373 m^{2}), freestanding store was opened on Westheimer Road at Post Oak near The Galleria.

Eventually, the chain expanded to 16 locations, of which 14 were in Texas, one in Scottsdale, Arizona and another in Tulsa, Oklahoma.

=== Sakowitz II format ===
Some of the new sububrban stores were designated as the "Sakowitz II" format, essentially junior department stores, smaller in scale and targeting markets within a 3-to-5-mile (5-to-8 km) radius of each store, rather than 5-to-20-mile (8-to-32 km) like full-line stores did. The Champions Village store was the first in 1978; another in Clear Lake City (a.k.a. Ports O'Call or NASA), followed in 1979.Such locations included Champions Village in Northwest Houston, and near NASA.

There were purposefully no floor-to-ceiling walls in the Sakowitz II stores, and salespeople could wait on customers in different parts of the stores – men's, women's and children's; apparel, accessories and shoes. The smaller stores followed what Sakowitz's "I.D.A."merchandising strategy: innovational, directional and acceptational. Innovational fashion at the store's center, directional areas radiate from there, and acceptational merchandise lined the edges.

=== 1985 bankruptcy ===
By 1985, Sakowitz stores all together totalled 1,100,000 sq ft (102,193 m^{2}) in area. That year, an overextended Sakowitz filed for bankruptcy, and as part of the plan, they closed or sold off all the stores outside Greater Houston, as well as the 225,000 sq ft (20,903 m^{2}) downtown Houston store and the Gulfgate Mall location. Four profitable stores remained, all in suburban Houston: Post Oak, Town & Country, and two smaller stores at Clear View (NASA Road) and Champions.

=== Hooker ownership ===
In the late 1980s, Australian developer L. J. Hooker proposed an upscale mall in suburban Cincinnati, Ohio, Forest Fair Mall, now Forest Fair Village. Hooker's plans called for Sakowitz to be one of the mall's anchor stores, along with B. Altman and Bonwit Teller, two upscale chains based in New York City.

In 1988, Hooker purchased controlling interest in all three chains so that they could open locations at the new mall and a number of other malls that it had already planned or envisioned, including the proposed Lake Fair Mall in Tampa, Florida, as well as two New York State malls, Carousel Plaza (now Destiny USA) in Syracuse, and Walden Galleria in suburban Buffalo. Sakowitz opened its store there on March 31, 1989.

=== Liquidation ===
Only a few months after opening the Cincinnati mall with three of its department store, on August 9, 1989, Hooker filed for bankruptcy, due to debt accrued from its U.S. expansion. sold B. Altman back to its former owner, but proceeded to liquidate both Bonwit Teller and Sakowitz.

Over the course of 1990, all Sakowitz locations were closed, along with the Bonwit Teller and B. Altman chains.

=== Sakowitz Furs remains ===
Starting in 1976 originally Evans Fur Company leased Sakowitz' fur salons with Jerry Gronauer as manager. In 1986, Gronauer left Evans and started leasing the salon space from Sakowitz himself, and with his son, and the Gronauers continue to operate in a store near the old Post Oak Sakowitz store.

== Table of stores ==
Table of Sakowitz stores
Store Name	Store type	Opened	Closed	Metro area	Suburb or Neighborhood	Shopping Center	Size sq ft	Size sq m
Galveston	Men's & Boys	1902	1917	Galveston, Texas		2113 Market Street		
Downtown Houston; 1st location	Men's	1911	1917	Houston	Downtown	308 Main Street		
Downtown Houston; 2nd location	Men's & Boys'	1917	1929	Houston	Downtown	Main and Preston, Kiam Building		
Downtown Houston; 3rd location	Full-line	Apr 15, 1929	1951	Houston	Downtown	Gulf Building, Main and Rusk	60,000	5,574
The store launched with a grand celebration, with 25,000 expected to attend. No sales were permitted, the party was only to show off the elegant new large store. Decorated with art deco chandeliers, tall columns, and glass showcases. Featured a grand staircase leading up to the mezzanine and higher floors.
Downtown Houston; 4th location	Full-line*	1951	1990	Houston	Downtown	1111 Main Street	254,000	23,600
Alfred C. Finn. architect. 5 stories. Sky Terrace restaurant. The exterior remains, but inside has been converted to a parking garage.
Shamrock Hotel	Men's Shop	1952	closed	Houston	Downtown	Shamrock Hotel		
Gulfgate Mall	Full-line	1956	1985	Houston	East End	Gulfgate Mall	128,900	11,980
Post Oak	Full-line	Mar 1959	1990	Houston	Galleria area	Westheimer and Post Oak	187,000	17,400
5000 Westheimer Road, on the northwest corner of Post Oak Boulevard. Colonial style architecture. Expanded in 1970. Old Colony Restaurant and Crazy Calorie fast casual restaurants. Demolished, now the site of The Centre at Post Oak retail and dining complex.
Town & Country Village	Full-line	1967	1990	Houston	Memorial City	Town & Country Village		
At its center, the store had a prominent fountain with small green hued mosaic tiles and a metal sculpture from which water sprayed.
Amarillo	Full-line	1969	1985	Amarillo, Texas		Western Crossing mall		
Sakowitz merged with White & Kirk, a local Amarillo store founded in 1897 as White's Cash Store at 6th and Polk. In 1903 it became White & Kirk. In 1910 it ceased selling groceries and soon most other general merchandise, becoming an apparel store mostly for women. It moved into a new downtown store opened in 1938, which later expanded, adding a men's department, and again after merging with and expanding into the Trolinger-Smith store. It opened a store in the Western Crossing shopping center in 1968. Sold to and rebranded as Dunlaps in 1985.
Yves St. Laurent Boutique Dallas	Boutique	1973	closed	Dallas	North Dallas	4400 Lovers Lane		
Scottsdale AZ	Full-line	1974	Mar 9, 1986	Phoenix	Scottsdale	Camelview Plaza		
Champions	Sakowitz II	1978	1990	Houston	1960/Cypress (NW Houston)	Champions Village		
Valentino Boutique Dallas	Boutique	1978	closed	Dallas	North Dallas	4400 Lovers Lane		
Clear Lake	Sakowitz II	Aug 1979	1990	Houston	Clear Lake City; NASA area, Nassau Bay	Ports O'Call Fashion Mall	31,500	2,930
1400 NASA Boulevard, now site of Mid Towne Plaza strip mall. Opened by Bernard and Robert Sakowitz with a "fog-cutting" ceremony. The Galveston Daily News wrote: "…jewel of a store…the interior……utilizes angular and curving walls, varying ceiling height and floor levels, a dramatic marble center well with clerestoried skylight which all belnd to create an unusual spatial experience resembling a vertical diamond. Counter fixtures are made of early American Appalachian white oak and glass, and others are angular plexiglass and chrome. The floor covering are in gradations of gray blend with the textural wall surfaces in navy lacquer, salmon suede and natural hemp creating a complementary effect to the spatial experience."
Dallas	Full-line	1980	1985	Dallas	North Dallas	Sakowitz Village (now Village on the Parkway)		
Tulsa OK	Full-line	1980	1985	Tulsa	Southern Hills	Kensington Galleria (now Kensington Business Center)	70,000	6,503
Midland TX	Full-line	1980	1985	Midland, Texas	West Loop 250 North	Midland Park Mall		
Cincinnati OH	Full-line	Mar 31, 1989	closed	Cincinnati	Forest Park and Fairfield, Ohio	Forest Fair Mall		

*full-line department store
