= KOZA (Texas) =

Radio station in Odessa, Texas

- Odessa, Texas; United States
- Frequency: 1230 kHz

Ownership
- Owner: Stellar Media, Inc.
- Sister stations: KQLM

History
- First air date: January 19, 1947
- Last air date: August 1, 2021
- Former call signs: KOSA (1947–1968)

Technical information
- Facility ID: 41298
- Class: C
- Power: 1,000 watts
- Transmitter coordinates: 31°49′50.5″N 102°22′10.5″W

KOZA (1230 AM) was a radio station broadcasting a Tejano music format, licensed to Odessa, Texas. Last known as "La Koza Tejana", the station was last owned by Stellar Media, Inc.

== History ==
=== KOSA ===
KOSA went on the air at 7 am on January 19, 1947, as the CBS radio station for the Permian Basin. Operating on 1450 kHz, the new station was licensed to the Southwestern Broadcasting Corporation, owned by Dorrance D. Roderick. The Roderick stations—KOSA, El Paso's KROD and KSIL in Silver City, New Mexico, all CBS affiliates—formed a regional hookup known as the Southwest Network.

The station relocated from 1450 to 1230 kHz on April 20, 1949, after emerging victorious from a hearing in which the Federal Communications Commission denied competing proposals by a series of other stations to use the frequency. The station was sold to the Odessa Broadcasting Company in 1951, part of the Trigg-Vaughn Stations group, owned and operated by Cecil L. Trigg and Jack Vaughn. The company expanded to TV with KOSA-TV, which began telecasts on January 1, 1956, as a CBS affiliate. KOSA further increased its signal coverage with a daytime increase to 1,000 watts in 1964.

=== KOZA ===
May 1, 1968, saw KOSA become KOZA as Trigg-Vaughn sold all of its other media holdings, including KOSA-TV, which kept the call letters. It retained the radio station another 11 years as its lone broadcasting property until KOZA was acquired by Kansas-based Harris Enterprises in 1979. Under Harris, KOZA responded to the decline of top 40 music on AM by moving to a format that targeted an over-35 audience. Harris only owned the station for three years until manager Bob Russell, operating as Capital Communications, bought it out in 1982.

=== Demise and rebirth as a Spanish-language station ===
In the mid-1980s, the Permian Basin economy suffered due to low oil prices. KOZA was affected by the regional slump and ceased broadcasting the weekend of May 17–18, 1986. The silence of KOZA enabled a local Christian FM station, KKKK, to temporarily relocate to KOZA's studios after losing theirs in a January 1987 fire.

While KOZA was made available in an auction at the Odessa Hilton on May 12, 1987, it did not emerge until April 1989, when Mesa Entertainment bought the station and relaunched it with a Spanish-language music format. The station absorbed some talent and programming from KNDA when that station closed in 1991. In 2004, Mesa Entertainment sold the station to Stellar Media, in a transaction between two members of the Velásquez family.

KOZA was silent between November 24, 2014, and November 9, 2015, when the studio building was sold and the station was forced to relocate. Its license was not renewed and expired on August 1, 2021.
