= Midland RockHounds =

- Founded in 1972; Midland, Texas
Team logo
Cap insignia

Minor league affiliations
- Class: Double-A (1972–present)
- League: Texas League (1972–present)
- Division: South Division

Major league affiliations
- Team: Oakland Athletics / Athletics (1999–present)
- Previous teams: California / Anaheim Angels (1985–1998); Chicago Cubs (1972–1984)

Minor league titles
- League titles (7): 1975; 2005; 2009; 2014; 2015; 2016; 2017
- Division titles (11): 1975; 1995; 2005; 2009; 2010; 2014; 2015; 2016; 2017; 2024; 2025
- First-half titles (3): 1995; 2005; 2025
- Second-half titles (10): 1979; 1982; 1991; 2005; 2006; 2010; 2015; 2016; 2019; 2024
- Wild card berths (2): 2014; 2017

Team data
- Name: Midland RockHounds (1999–present)
- Previous names: Midland Angels (1985–1998); Midland Cubs (1972–1984)
- Colors: Navy blue, orange, silver, white
- Mascot: Juice the Moose (1990-present); Rocky RockHound (1999-present); Chip the Rock Hammer (2023-Present)
- Ballpark: Momentum Bank Ballpark (2002–present)
- Previous parks: Christensen Stadium (1972–2001)
- Owner/ Operator: Diamond Baseball Holdings
- President: Monty Hoppel
- General manager: Shelly Haenggi
- Manager: Gregorio Petit
- Website: milb.com/midland

The Midland RockHounds are a Minor League Baseball team based in Midland, Texas. The team, which plays in the Texas League, is the Double-A affiliate of the Athletics major league club. The RockHounds play in Momentum Bank Ballpark, which opened in 2002 and seats 4,709 fans. They have won seven Texas League championships: in 1975 (co-champions with the Lafayette Drillers), 2005, 2009, 2014, 2015, 2016 and 2017.

== History ==
The RockHounds were previously known as both the Midland Cubs (1972–1984) and Midland Angels (1985–1998). While Midland has been the Double-A affiliate of the Athletics since 1999, they were affiliated with the Chicago Cubs from 1972 to 1984, and then with the California Angels from 1985 to 1998. The team was renamed "Rockhounds", a nickname for geologists, as a reference to the oil and gas industry of the area.

The RockHounds have received numerous awards throughout their history. The Midland franchise under the Angels won the Texas League Organization of the Year in 1990 and 1994 and as the RockHounds in 2002. In 1995, Midland won Double-A Baseball's highest award, the Bob Frietas Award. General Manager Monty Hoppel has been named Executive of the Year with the franchise three times (1991, 1995, and 2002).

In 1995, Midland reached its first-ever playoff appearance as an affiliate of the Angels and their first playoff appearance overall in 20 years. It also became the first season that Midland accumulated more than 200,000 fans in a season, a feat repeated in 1996. The feat surprised many in Minor League Baseball as the Midland-Odessa area only has just over 200,000 residents total. The RockHounds moved into Momentum Bank Ballpark, part of the Scharbauer Sports Complex on the west side of Midland, in 2002. Since then, the RockHounds have averaged over 250,000 fans every season. Prior to that, their home had been what is now known as Christensen Stadium, in northeast Midland.

The Rockhounds won their first ever Texas League Championship in 2005. They shared the title with the Lafayette Drillers in 1975 as the Cubs. In 2006, they won the second-half championship of the South Division, but they lost to the eventual champion Corpus Christi Hooks in the division playoffs.

In 2007, the RockHounds won the John H. Johnson President's Award, Minor League baseball highest award for a franchise, making them the third Texas League franchise to do so after the El Paso Diablos and the Tulsa Drillers.

In 2009, the RockHounds won their second Texas League pennant, defeating the Northwest Arkansas Naturals three games to one in the Championship Series. In 2010, the RockHounds returned to the Texas League title game, but this time fell to the Naturals.

In 2017, the RockHounds won their fourth straight Texas League title, the first team to do so since the Fort Worth Panthers won six in a row from 1920 to 1925.

In conjunction with Major League Baseball's restructuring of Minor League Baseball in 2021, the RockHounds were organized into the Double-A Central. In 2022, the Double-A Central became known as the Texas League, the name historically used by the regional circuit prior to the 2021 reorganization.

== On the radio ==
The Midland Rockhounds have always had a play-by-play broadcast that has been available. KCRS (AM) had been the network to carry roughly 95% of the Rockhounds games since they debuted in 1972. Some afternoon games in 2008 didn't air on the radio due to contracts with Rush Limbaugh and others. For the 2009 season Gap Broadcasting announced the Rockhounds would have a new radio home, KFZX, also known as 102.1 Jack FM. For the 2010 season, the Rockhounds once again moved radio homes to KMRK 96.1 FM. In both cases Bob Hards remained the voice of the Rockhounds, a position he has currently held for 19 consecutive years. In 2013 the Rockhounds moved their games back to KCRS, though weekday day games would be preempted for talk shows that were already scheduled.

== Notable players ==
- Brett Anderson
- Garret Anderson
- Andrew Bailey
- Billy Burns
- Eric Byrnes
- Trevor Cahill
- Chris Carter
- Joe Carter
- Matt Chapman
- Nelson Cruz
- Josh Donaldson
- Sean Doolittle
- Ryan Dull
- Shawon Dunston
- Damion Easley
- Jim Edmonds
- Darin Erstad
- Andre Ethier
- Zack Gelof
- Troy Glaus
- Sonny Gray
- A.J. Griffin
- Rich Harden
- Billy Hatcher
- Ryon Healy
- Mark Kiger (first player in modern MLB history to debut in a postseason game (October 13, 2006; game three of the 2006 ALCS))
- Mike Krukow
- Dennis Lamp
- Carlos Lezcano
- Joe Maddon (Manager)
- Sean Manaea
- Randy Martz
- Mark McLemore
- Donnie Moore
- Matt Olson
- Karl Pagel
- Troy Percival
- Bryan Price
- Addison Russell
- Tim Salmon
- Lee Smith
- Dan Straily
- Huston Street
- Bruce Sutter (elected to the Hall of Fame in 2006)
- Nick Swisher
- Joey Wagman
- Barry Zito

== Roster ==
Midland RockHounds roster
Players	Coaches/Other
Pitchers: 43 Mark Adamiak; 27 Corey Avant; -- Henry Baez; 45 Diego Barrera; -- A.J. Causey; 29 Micah Dallas; 32 Stevie Emanuels; 34 James Gonzalez; -- J.J. Goss; 16 Colton Johnson; 14 Will Johnston; 41 Wei-En Lin; 27 Mitch Myers; -- CD Pelham; -- Darlin Pinales; -- Domingo Robles; 28 Shohei Tomioka; Catchers: 1 Davis Diaz; 22 Carlos Franco; -- Shane McGuire; 10 CJ Rodriguez; Infielders: 7 Leo De Vries; -- Colby Halter; 6 Joshua Kuroda-Grauer; -- Luke Mann; 9 Brennan Milone; -- German Ortiz; 23 Tommy White; 11 Casey Yamauchi; Outfielders: 14 Brayan Buelvas; 12 Jared Dickey; 8 Clark Elliott; -- Ryan Lasko; 13 Nate Nankil	Manager: 31 Gregorio Petit; Coaches: 19 Gunnar Buhner (assistant hitting); -- Dave Burba (bullpen); 25 Juan Dilone (hitting); 33 Beau Taylor (coach); 60-day injured list: 40 Edgar Sanchez; 7-day injured list; * On Athletics 40-man roster; ~ Development list; # Rehab assignment; ∞ Reserve list; ‡ Restricted list; § Suspended list; † Temporarily inactive list; Roster updated March 26, 2026; Transactions; → More rosters: MiLB • Texas League; → Athletics minor league players
