= KCKM =

Radio station in Monahans, Texas

- Monahans, Texas; United States
- Broadcast area: Ward, Winkler, Reeves, Midland, Andrews, Crane, Ector & Pecos Counties
- Frequency: 1330 kHz
- Branding: Kickin' Country

Programming
- Format: Classic Country

Ownership
- Owner: Kickin' Country Broadcasting, LLC

History
- First air date: 1947 (as KVKM)
- Former call signs: KVKM (1947–1989); KLBO (1989–2007)

Technical information
- Licensing authority: FCC
- Facility ID: 35048
- Class: B
- Power: 12,000 watts day 1,000 watts night
- Transmitter coordinates: 31°38′45.5″N 103°0′5.6″W
- Repeater: 94.7 MHZ (KTXO)

Links
- Public license information: Public file; LMS
- Webcast: Listen Live
- Website: kckm1330.com

KCKM (1330 AM, Kickin Country) is a radio station broadcasting a classic country music format. Licensed to Monahans, Texas, United States. The station is currently owned by Kickin' Country Broadcasting, LLC.

== History ==
The radio station began broadcasting in 1947 at 1340 kHz with 250 watts full-time using the call letters of KVKM "The Voice of Kermit and Monahans". In 1961, KVKM changed frequency to 1330 kHz and increased daytime power to 5000 watts and increased nighttime power to 1000 watts using a directional antenna system only at night. In 1982, KGEE was launched as an FM sister channel. In October 2009, KCKM received a grant from the Federal Communications Commission to increase daytime power to 12,000 watts. Construction was completed in August 2010. Previous owners include Sandhills Communications and Hal and Patsy Calloway. KCKM covers the entire Permian Basin, which includes the Odessa-Midland radio market.
