= KCHX =

Radio station in Midland, Texas

Midland, Texas; United States
- Broadcast area: Midland–Odessa metropolitan area
- Frequency: 106.7 MHz
- Branding: Que Buena 106.7

Programming
- Format: Regional Mexican

Ownership
- Owner: ICA Communications, I Ltd.; (ICA Radio Midland-Odessa License, LLC)
- Sister stations: KCRS, KCRS-FM, KFZX, KMRK-FM

History
- First air date: 1988

Technical information
- Licensing authority: FCC
- Facility ID: 60801
- Class: C1
- ERP: 100,000 watts
- HAAT: 207 meters
- Transmitter coordinates: 31°54′53″N 101°57′49″W

Links
- Public license information: Public file; LMS
- Webcast: Listen Live
- Website: quebuena106.com

KCHX (106.7 FM, "Que Buena 106.7") is a radio station that broadcasts a Regional Mexican format. Licensed to Midland, Texas, United States, it serves the Midland–Odessa metropolitan area. The station is owned by ICA Communications.

KCHX studios are located at the ICA Business Plaza on East Eighth Street in Odessa, just east of downtown, and its transmitter is located southeast of Midland.

== History ==
KCHX first premiered in 1988 as "Foxy 106", a Rhythmic station. By 1990 it shifted to Mainstream Top 40, which lasted five years before returning to Rhythmic in late 1995, when it became "Power 106.7." By 1999 KCHX shifted back to Top 40/CHR but for a brief period, as it flipped to Rhythmic Oldies in 2000. In 2002 KCHX switched to an AC format. Despite the transfer from Clear Channel Communications to Gap Broadcasting, and then to ICA Communications while it maintained its AC format. Gap Broadcasting sold its entire West Texas cluster to ICA Communications for $3 Million. In 2011 KCHX shifted to an Adult Top 40 as it added Hot AC currents to its playlist. On October 14, 2014 KCHX changed its name to Que Buena 106 and changed its format to Tejano music.
