= KCRS-FM =

- Midland, Texas; United States
- Broadcast area: Midland-Odessa
- Frequency: 103.3 MHz
- Branding: La Lupe 103.3

Programming
- Language: Spanish
- Format: Classic hits
- Affiliations: Premiere Networks

Ownership
- Owner: ICA Broadcasting, I Ltd.; (ICA Radio Midland-Odessa License, LLC)
- Sister stations: KCHX, KCRS-AM, KFZX, KMRK-FM

History
- First air date: 1976
- Former call signs: KWMJ (1976–1990)

Technical information
- Licensing authority: FCC
- Facility ID: 9667
- Class: C1
- ERP: 100,000 watts
- HAAT: 280.0 meters (918.6 ft)
- Transmitter coordinates: 32°5′11″N 102°17′10″W

Links
- Public license information: Public file; LMS
- Webcast: Listen Live

KCRS-FM (103.3 MHz La Lupe 103.3) is a radio station that serves the Midland–Odessa metropolitan area with Spanish classic hits music.

The station signed on the air in 1976 as KWMJ-FM which was a Muzak format known as "Beautiful Music for Midland-Odessa." It remained a Muzak format till it changed its call letters to match the AM station it had shared studios with at 1001 S. Midkiff in Midland since 1976, KCRS-AM. FM 103.3 became KCRS-FM and flipped to a Top 40 format known as "K-103" in 1990. It remained a Top 40 format for a few years and then switched to an AC format known as "Max 103." In late 2000 it was purchased by Clear Channel Communications, Inc and changed its format back to top 40 and branded itself as "103.3 Kiss FM."

The station is currently owned by ICA Broadcasting, a local company. They acquired the contract for $3 million in 2010 from Gap Broadcasting (whom acquired many stations including KCRS-FM from Clear Channel Communications). Its studios are located at the ICA Business Plaza on East Eighth Street in Odessa, just east of downtown, and its transmitter is located in Gardendale, Texas.

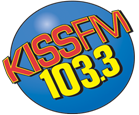
Previous logo, used from 2003 to 2026

On June 6, 2026 at midnight, after playing "She Did It Again" by Tyla, KCRS-FM flipped to a Spanish-language classic hits format, with a heavy emphasis on classic regional Mexican titles, as "La Lupe 103.3", launching with "La Mejor de Todas" by Banda el Recodo. The change comes after a quiet shift to rhythmic adult contemporary was performed in the summer of 2025, which failed to overtake Townsquare Media's KZBT, which resulted in a return to mainstream CHR, albeit with a rhythmic lean, which still had not translated into ratings. In the Fall 2025 Nielsen books, KCRS-FM held a 4.3 share, while KZBT led the market with a 10.5, with hot AC KODM holding a 5.4 share, and leaves the market without a mainstream CHR.
