= Gulfgate Center =

Shopping Centre

Coordinates: 29.6984°N 95.2949°W

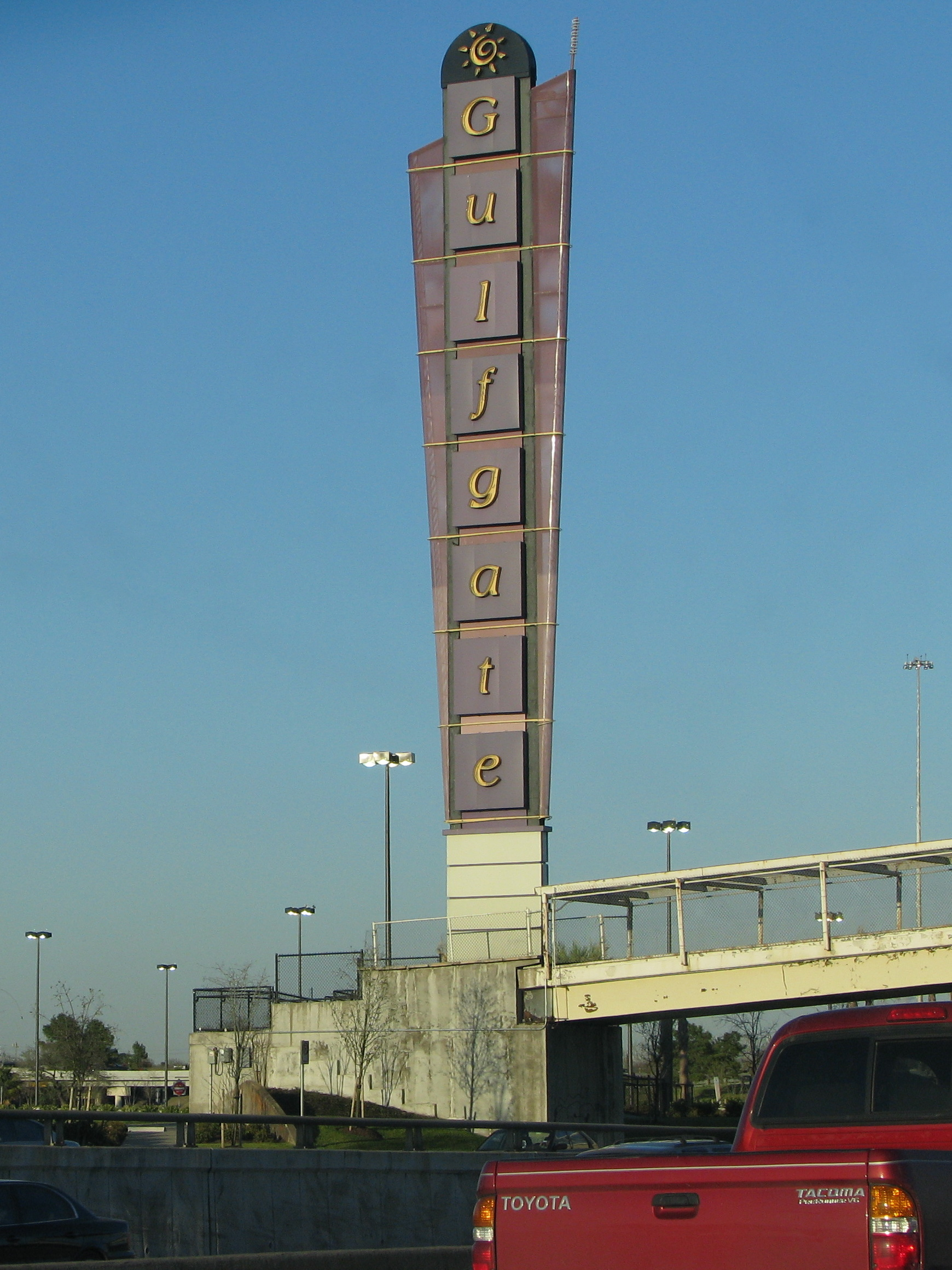
Gulfgate Sign

Gulfgate Center, also known as Gulfgate Shopping City or Gulfgate Center, is a shopping center located in the East End, Houston, Texas, United States. The mall is located northwest of the intersection of the Gulf Freeway and Interstate 610. This is not an indoor shopping mall, it is a center of individual retail stores.

== History ==
It was the first regional mall in the Houston area, opening as Gulfgate Shopping Center on 20 September 1956 with Joske's, Sakowitz, Weingarten's, J. J. Newberry and W. T. Grant. The architects were John Graham & Company.

Popularly known as Gulfgate Mall, many remember this being the first Air Conditioned mall in America

Gulfgate Kiddieland opened in the mall on 21 March 1957.

In the early-1960s, while the Manned Spacecraft Center (MSC) was under construction in the Clear Lake area, NASA personnel opened temporary offices in center in about 3,000 square feet (280 m^{2}) of floor space donated for the purpose by the Gulfgate management. MSC had a continuing operation there until additional office, engineering and laboratory space could be leased and made ready for occupation. Operations at the Gulfgate offices were largely concerned with procurement, personnel and public affairs.

The shopping center was enclosed around 1967 and, after years of decline and competition, shuttered in 2000. In 2001 the original mall and the former Mervyn's (across Woodridge) were demolished and redeveloped into a strip mall configuration, anchored by H-E-B, Best Buy, Office Depot, Marshalls, and Lowe's.
