= Western Crossing =

Coordinates: 35°11′22″N 101°52′54″W

Western Crossing, formerly known as Western Plaza, is a strip mall in Amarillo, Texas, United States. It opened in 1968 with a construction cost of approximately US$13 million. Western Plaza was once a main shopping point in Amarillo, but from the 1980s to 2000s has suffered stores leaving its complex. It is demolished and a new shopping center is being built. The Western Crossings shopping center is estimated to cost US$40 million.

== History ==
The mall opened with White & Kirk (a local department store), Woolco, and Montgomery Ward as its anchor stores. In the 1970s, White & Kirk was converted to Sakowitz, which in turn was converted to Dunlaps before closing in the 2000s. Woolco closed in the early 1980s and was replaced with H. J. Wilson Co., a catalog showroom that later became Service Merchandise. After Service Merchandise closed. Another notable tenant of Western Plaza was the first Hastings Entertainment store. In addition, Western Plaza also had a business college, Academy of Professional Careers.

== Selling and demolishing ==
On August 1, 2001, Triple Net Properties of California officially announced the purchase of the run down mall. They announced plans to rejuvenate Western Plaza., including bringing in new anchor stores. Cathy Derr, the leasing representative for Western Plaza was quoted in the Amarillo Globe news saying she hopes to have the mall up to 65 to 85 percent occupancy within the year.

By late 2005 plans had been altered significantly. On November 29, 2005, The Sietz Group of Plano, a developer hired by Triple Net Properties, announced plans for a new retail center called Western Crossing to be built in place of Western Plaza. "We're going to completely redo it. We're going to tear it down," said Carmen Dominguez, in-house counsel for The Seitz Group of Plano. Negotiations began to relocate the remaining tenants.

In 2006, several problems arose. A tax abatement sought from the city to help with costs was unsuccessful. Asbestos problems increased projected demolition cost to $29 million from $27 million. And a former tenant, Texas Panhandle Mental Health Mental Retardation, sued the owners of Western Plaza for the more than $50,000 the local community mental health mental retardation center said it had incurred since being evicted to make way for a $29 million shopping center makeover.

In June 2006, the signs of the mall were taken down. On June 7, 2007, demolition began and was scheduled to be done in 60 days.

Rudy's BBQ, Cheddar's Casual Café, Burlington Coat Factory, and an Orange Leaf Frozen Yogurt location are all open. Michael's, Petco, Mardel Bookstore and other stores have since opened as well.

The mall and its land have been owned by Santa Ana, California-based company, Triple Net Properties since 2001. Western Plaza's past owners include: Mattie Hedgecoke Properties, Southmark Corporation of Dallas, Texas, Spigel Properties of San Antonio, Texas, and General Electric Capital Corporation, the financial arm of General Electric.
