= KFZX =

Radio station in Gardendale–Midland/Odessa, Texas

Gardendale, Texas; United States
- Broadcast area: Midland/Odessa, Texas
- Frequency: 102.1 MHz
- Branding: 102.1 The Eagle

Programming
- Format: Classic hits

Ownership
- Owner: ICA Communications, I Ltd.; (ICA Radio Midland-Odessa Licensee, LLC)
- Sister stations: KCHX, KCRS-AM/FM, KMRK-FM

History
- First air date: 1983 (as KWES)
- Former call signs: KWES (4/27/81–9/12/89); KMGP (9/12/89–1/06/92); KCDQ (1/06/92–5/13/99)

Technical information
- Licensing authority: FCC
- Facility ID: 21419
- Class: C
- ERP: 100,000 watts
- HAAT: 300 meters (980 ft)
- Transmitter coordinates: 31°57′55″N 102°46′10″W

Links
- Public license information: Public file; LMS
- Webcast: Listen Live
- Website: theeagle1021.com

KFZX (102.1 FM) is a radio station located in the Midland/Odessa, Texas market which plays a Classic hits music format. Its studios are located at the ICA Business Plaza on East Eighth Street in Odessa, just east of downtown, and its transmitter is located in far west rural Ector County, Texas.

== History ==
102.1 went on air in 1983 as "K-WES the HOT 102 FM", broadcasting a Top 40/CHR format. The city of license was Monahans, Texas. The station went on air from a thousand-foot tower near Notrees, Texas.

The CP was obtained by two Houston disk jockeys Bruce Nelson Stratton and Ladd Joe Macha. They formed a company partly funded by the owners of KTRH and KLOL Houston (The Jones family d/b/a the Rusk Corporation). The project was overseen by Bill Cordell, P.E. of Houston. He supervised the construction of studios in a double-wide trailer, and of a transmitter in another large prefab. The studios were dropped into place in Monahans and hooked up and tested by Don Hackler (then KLLL chief engineer, now KCSM FM/TV) and Paul Easter (then KOYL/KUFO, now at Houston Christian Broadcasters and Fort Bend Broadcast Services).

KWES raided 1410 KRIG of much of its air staff. KWES was a great success in its early years. During the mid and late 80s recession, the format was changed to a more buyer-friendly soft AC as KMGP (Magic in the Permian). Studios began in Monahans, additional studios were built in Odessa. After 1986 the Monahans studios were discontinued (change in FCC rules). Call letters changed to KCDQ in 1990 playing mainly a classic rock format. In 1998, KCDQ (along with sister stations KMRK, KCRS (AM and FM), and KCHX were bought by Clear Channel Communications, and its call letters were changed to the present KFZX. Along with the purchase of the station came an affiliation agreement with The Bob and Tom Show and a change in format to a mix of more contemporary and alternative rock with a mix of classic fare and (for many years) going by the slogan "The Basin's Absolute Rock. 102.1 FZX" (similar to sister station KFMX. The city of license was changed to Gardendale in the early 2000s.

In December 2007, the station's format began another overhaul with its format being changed back to a classic rock format shortly after being purchased by Gap Broadcasting that August. (Its slogan basically remained the same except for a slight change from "absolute rock" to "classic rock" FZX.

On March 1, 2008, KFZX began another format change to Jack FM without much warning. With the change also drew an end to the affiliation deal with The Bob & Tom Show. On March 1, 2010, the station returned to a classic rock format.

On October 11, 2009; it was announced that Gap Broadcasting was planning to sell its entire Midland-Odessa cluster to ICA Broadcasting for $3 Million, a sale finalized in February 2010.

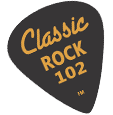
Previous logo

On March 1, 2010 KFZX dropped the JACK-FM format because of poor ratings performance and relaunched the Classic Rock format under the direction of former Program Director Steve Driscoll using the on air Brand Classic Rock 102. Since the relaunch KFZX has enjoyed ratings success.

In December 2024, KFZX re-branded as "The Eagle" and shifted to a broader rock-leaning classic hits format.

== College basketball radio broadcasts ==
In October 2008, Jack FM announced that Odessa College of the NJCAA had signed a deal with them transferring the Western Junior College Athletic Conference men's and women's basketball road broadcasts and the home game against Midland College from KCRS (AM) to Jack FM. All games would also be streamed online at no cost. The first matches on that agreement were broadcast December 6, 2008, when the OC teams visited South Plains College. The road game against Clarendon College was later moved off of the broadcast schedule due to broadcast difficulties during the previous two seasons. In 2009 Jack FM also acquired the right to air select NCAA Division II UTPB men's home conference basketball games. UTPB plays as part of the Heartland Conference. The first of these games was broadcast January 11, 2009. Home games against Lincoln University and Oklahoma Panhandle State University were not broadcast due to times clashing with the preexisting OC schedule.

For the 2009-10 season Jack FM decided to drop the UTPB broadcasts and the OC road game against New Mexico Military Institute due to contractual obligations with Jack FM nationally. However they broadcast all other Wrangler road games, except for the previously mentioned game against Clarendon College.

== Midland RockHounds radio ==
After a successful debut with basketball, Gap Broadcasting decided to move the 2009 Texas League Oakland Athletics affiliate Midland RockHounds radio network games to KFZX, a move which was criticized by some as News Talk 550 KCRS had been the broadcast home of the Midland franchise since their debut in 1972. Despite the move, the broadcasts would essentially remain the same. Bob Hards remains the play-by-play voice, a position he has currently held for 18 years, and sponsorships remain intact. Regular Jack FM broadcasts were not heard during the games, as the games were broadcast live with a pre-game usually 15 to 30 minutes before the opening pitch and then a post-game show, which usually lasted 10 to 20 minutes. The Jack FM feed resumed immediately after the post-game show. The contract lasted for one season, at which time the RockHounds home games were moved to sister station KMRK.

In 2013 the RockHounds would return to KFZK for a partial schedule. KFZK served as the home for all weekday afternoon games and when the Houston Texans, Texas Tech Red Raiders, or Midland High and Midland Lee football was scheduled to air at the same time on sister station Newstalk 550 KCRS.

== Odessa Jackalopes radio ==
During the 2009 Texas High School baseball playoffs, TSRN (the Texas Sports Radio Network) asked Jack FM if they would be interested in broadcasting the OHS baseball team playoff games. They replied that they had no interest in broadcasting high school sports at this time, but they announced that there sports programming would continue to increase as they began broadcasting the 2009-2010 Odessa Jackalopes CHL Hockey games. This marked the first time that Jack FM didn't get a sports broadcast from a current contract, instead acquiring the Jackalopes contract from rival station KMCM. The broadcast rights also allowed them to take over the Monday night talk show Hockey Talk.

== High school football ==
In 2016, KFZX acquired the rights to air the second half of Midland Lee/Midland High football games alongside NewsTalk 550.
