= Christensen Stadium =

Stadium in Midland, Texas, US

- Interactive map of Christensen Stadium
- Full name: Christensen Stadium
- Location: Midland, Texas
- Coordinates: 32.044414°N 102.076131°W
- Capacity: 5,000

Construction
- Opened: 1952

Christensen Stadium is a stadium in Midland, Texas. It has been used for baseball and was home of the Midland RockHounds until they moved to Momentum Bank Ballpark in 2002. The ballpark has a capacity of 5,000 people and opened in 1952. It was previously known as Angels Stadium and Cubs Stadium when the park hosted AA teams for those franchises. Today Christensen Stadium is used for amateur games at the college and high school levels.

The stadium has occasionally been used for concerts, the late Tejano singer Selena performed in the stadium in 1994 (then called Angels Stadium) for a charity event and Lynyrd Skynyrd performed in the stadium in 2010 in support of their 2009 album God & Guns.
