= KMRK-FM =

Radio station in Odessa, Texas

Coordinates: 32.087°N 102.287°W

- Odessa, Texas; United States
- Broadcast area: Midland-Odessa
- Frequency: 96.1 MHz
- Branding: Hot Country 96.1

Programming
- Format: Country
- Affiliations: Premiere Networks

Ownership
- Owner: ICA Communications, I Ltd.; (ICA Radio Midland-Odessa License, LLC)
- Sister stations: KCHX, KCRS-FM/AM, KFZX

History
- First air date: 1991

Technical information
- Licensing authority: FCC
- Facility ID: 41856
- Class: C1
- ERP: 27,500 watts
- HAAT: 289 meters (948 ft)

Links
- Public license information: Public file; LMS
- Webcast: Listen live
- Website: hotcountry96.com

KMRK-FM (96.1 MHz, "Hot Country 96.1") is a radio station that serves the Midland–Odessa metropolitan area with country music. The station is owned by ICA Communications, who acquired this station and its sister stations for $3 million in 2010 from Gap Broadcasting. Gap had acquired the many stations, including this one, from Clear Channel Communications in 2007. One of the first announcements was that KMRK would broadcast the Midland RockHounds' entire 2010 season.

Its studios are located at the ICA Business Plaza on East Eighth Street in Odessa, just east of downtown, and its transmitter is located in Gardendale, Texas.

== History ==
The station was a Tejano outlet from 1993 until it flipped to Rhythmic contemporary in 2000 as "WiLD 96.1." On July 31, 2008, KMRK flipped to country music and adopted the moniker "My 96.1 Country". On August 29, 2025, KMRK rebranded as "Hot Country 96.1".
