= KNDA (Odessa, Texas) =

Radio station in Odessa, Texas (1980–1991)

Coordinates: 31°48′9″N 102°22′57″W

Odessa, Texas; United States
- Broadcast area: Midland-Odessa
- Frequency: 1000 kHz
- Branding: Qué Onda

Programming
- Format: Defunct (formerly Tejano)

Ownership
- Owner: L & T Enterprises, Inc.

History
- First air date: September 26, 1980
- Last air date: June 16, 1991
- Former call signs: KJJT (1980–1989)
- Call sign meaning: From the station's last name "Qué Onda"

Technical information
- Facility ID: 36070
- Class: D
- Power: 1,000 watts (daytime only)

KNDA (1000 AM) was a radio station in Odessa, Texas, that served the Midland–Odessa metropolitan area. It aired Spanish-language formats throughout its 11-year history. In its final days, it was known as Qué Onda with a bilingual Tejano format.

== History ==
1000 kHz went on the air as KJJT on September 26, 1980. It was the first Spanish-language station for the Midland-Odessa area.

In 1986, L & T Enterprises was sold by its original owners, Alfredo G. Levario and O.L.A., Inc., to Rubén Velásquez, though the station itself claimed that the sale had taken place in 1985 and news reporting stated the transfer was part of a foreclosure sale. 1985 was also the year that KJJT gained its first Spanish-language competitor in the market, when 1310 KOYL flipped to Spanish-language programming under new ownership.

KJJT became KNDA on April 20, 1989, the same day it relaunched as "Qué Onda", a bilingual station playing Tejano music. However, the format failed to take off in Odessa, as it had in larger Texas cities. KNDA signed off for good on June 16, 1991, citing a lack of interest in Tejano music and "other reasons" for the closure. Ector County records showed that L & T Enterprises had $57,000 in federal tax liens, related to employee payroll taxes, against the company. KOZA, with which KNDA shared studio space, absorbed most of KNDA's 10 employees and began adding Tejano music to its programming.
