= KZBT =

Coordinates: 31.958°N 102.067°W

- Midland, Texas; United States
- Broadcast area: Midland-Odessa
- Frequency: 93.3 MHz
- Branding: B93

Programming
- Format: Rhythmic contemporary
- Affiliations: Compass Media Networks

Ownership
- Owner: Townsquare Media; (Townsquare License, LLC)
- Sister stations: KBAT, KMND, KNFM, KODM, KRIL

History
- Former call signs: KBAT

Technical information
- Licensing authority: FCC
- Facility ID: 35880
- Class: C1
- ERP: 100,000 watts
- HAAT: 134 meters

Links
- Public license information: Public file; LMS
- Webcast: Listen Live
- Website: b93.net

KZBT (93.3 FM, "B93") is a rhythmic contemporary radio station serving the Midland-Odessa region. The station is owned by Townsquare Media, and its studios are located on Highway 191 just west of Midland (its city of license) in rural Midland County. The station's transmitter is located just south of Midland.

KZBT originally signed on with a country music format in the mid-1970s. In December 1985, it was flipped to a rock format and named "Rock 93 K-B-A-T The Bat". The station was successful for the rest of the 1980s and most of the 1990s but lost much of its audience in the late 1990s and the format flipped to rhythmic CHR in September 1998 and launched "B93 The Beat of the Basin" with the former airstaff of KCHX "Power 106.7." The station is now known as "B93 - The 432's Party Station."

B93 was issued the call letters KZBT on September 13, 2005 as a switch from the former call letters KBAT that were issued to the frequency since its sign on in the mid-1970s. This was done to free up the call letters for the return of KBAT as a rock station at 99.9 FM.

As of June 2007, KZBT was also being simulcast over the frequency 97.3 in Pecos, Texas. In February 2018, KGEE FM 97.3, which did simulcast KZBT was transferred to Route 66 Media, LLC.

== Airstaff ==
- Leo and Rebecca in the Morning (Leo Caro & Rebecca Cruz)
- XXL Radio
- R-Dub (Part of the nationally syndicated Slow Jamz Sunday)
- syndicated shows (not live)
