= KBAT =

Coordinates: 31.761°N 102.525°W

Monahans, Texas; United States
- Broadcast area: Midland-Odessa
- Frequency: 99.9 MHz
- Branding: K-BAT 99.9

Programming
- Format: Classic rock
- Affiliations: Compass Media Networks; United Stations Radio Networks; Westwood One

Ownership
- Owner: Townsquare Media; (Townsquare License, LLC)
- Sister stations: KMND, KNFM, KODM, KRIL, KZBT

History
- First air date: November 1, 1983 (as KGEE)
- Former call signs: KGEE (1981–2005)
- Call sign meaning: K-BAT

Technical information
- Licensing authority: FCC
- Facility ID: 48433
- Class: C1
- ERP: 100,000 watts
- HAAT: 175 meters

Links
- Public license information: Public file; LMS
- Webcast: Listen Live
- Website: kbat.com

KBAT (99.9 FM), branded as K-BAT 99.9. is a radio station licensed to Monahans, Texas that serves the Midland–Odessa metropolitan area with a classic rock format. The station is under ownership of Townsquare Media. Its studios are located on Highway 191 just west of Midland (its city of license) in rural Midland County. The station's transmitter is located just southwest of Odessa.

== History ==
KBAT call letters were originally located on 93.3 FM and were moved over to 99.9 FM on September 13, 2005 to re-launch the rock station format the call letters had and made famous from 1985 to 1998. Re-launched on September 15, 2005 as "The Basin's Real Rock 99.9 K-BAT." You can listen to them online at http://kbat.com/listen-live.

Prior to changing to rock in September, 2005 the station was known as KGEE "Joy 99.9" and broadcast a contemporary Christian format for about a year. Prior to that, it had been Country as KGEE "KG-100" since signing on in the early 1980s.

KBAT-FM was put on the air by Bob Hicks, owner of KWEL-AM. Hicks put KBAT on the air in 1973 as the first completely automated 100,000-watt station in Texas. The format was country using the Drake-Chenault programming. Hicks bought KWEL-AM in 1969 from Winston J (Buddy) Deane who owned KOTN-AM in Pine Bluff, Arkansas. Both KWEL-AM and KBAT-FM were located in the Downtowner Motor Inn in Downtown Midland, Texas. The studios were later moved to a location on Andrews Highway in Midland.

KGEE began as a sister station to KVKM (AM) Monahans, TX in 1982. The original CP was issued to KVKM and called for a 100 kW signal at a few hundred feet from the KVKM tower between Monahans and Kermit. That was never built. The CP was modified to specify a 500 tower near Penwell and Duro. Studios were in Monhans at KVKM, then an additional set of studios were built in Odessa, and the Monahans studios were dismantled once FCC rules changed in 1986.

On January 8, 2018 KBAT shifted their format from album-oriented rock to classic rock.

During the 1960s KBAT-AM was a top 40 station broadcasting out of San Antonio.
