= KRIL =

Radio station in Odessa, Texas (1946–2014)

Coordinates: 31°49′00″N 102°21′00″W

- Odessa, Texas; United States
- Broadcast area: Midland-Odessa
- Frequency: 1410 kHz

Ownership
- Owner: Townsquare Media; (Townsquare Media Odessa-Midland II License, LLC)
- Sister stations: KBAT, KMND, KNFM, KODM, KZBT

History
- First air date: 1946
- Last air date: July 17, 2014
- Former call signs: KRIG (1946–1987)
- Call sign meaning: "Real Country"

Technical information
- Facility ID: 12080
- Class: B
- Power: 900 watts (day); 235 watts (night)

KRIL (1410 AM) was a radio station that served the Midland–Odessa metropolitan area of Texas with classic country music. In its final days, it was under ownership of Townsquare Media and branded as "Real Country 1410 KRIL".

== History ==
KRIG went on the air in 1946 under the auspices of the Oil Center Broadcasting Company. It broadcast with 1,000 watts on 1410 kHz and was often known as K-RIG, reflecting the oil rigs common in the region. During the 1970s the station had a Top 40 format ranking as one of the top stations in the Odessa/Midland market competing with two other AM Top 40 stations KOZA 1230 AM licensed to Odessa and KCRS 550 AM licensed to neighboring Midland. KRIG "The Rig 14" broadcast Casey Kasem's American Top 40 from 1980-1984. The airstaff of KRIG moved to a new station, KWES-FM 102 after KRIG was sold in early 1984. When it was sold in 1984 it switched to a classical music format and the call letters were changed to KRIL. In the late 1990s KRIL was sold to Cumulus Media where it simulcast 1510 KMND which was a News Talk station.

At one point in its history KRIL was an affiliate of the Dallas Cowboys radio network and the Rush Limbaugh Program (before the show moved to KCRS-AM), and in the 2000s, it simulcast ESPN radio along with KMND 1510 AM.

KRIL was taken off the air (silent) on July 16, 2014 and its tower torn down to facilitate the sale of its transmitter site to a third party. The license was returned to the Federal Communications Commission (FCC) on July 17, 2014, and cancelled by the FCC on the same day.
