= KNFM =

Coordinates: 32.098°N 102.290°W

- Midland, Texas; United States
- Broadcast area: Midland–Odessa metropolitan area
- Frequency: 92.3 MHz
- Branding: Lonestar 92.3

Programming
- Format: Country
- Affiliations: Compass Media Networks

Ownership
- Owner: Townsquare Media; (Townsquare License, LLC)
- Sister stations: KBAT, KMND, KODM, KRIL, KZBT

History
- First air date: May 30, 1976

Technical information
- Licensing authority: FCC
- Facility ID: 28202
- Class: C
- ERP: 100,000 watts
- HAAT: 300 meters

Links
- Public license information: Public file; LMS
- Webcast: Listen Live
- Website: lonestar923.com

KNFM (92.3 FM), branded as "Lonestar 92.3", is a country music-formatted radio station that serves the Midland–Odessa metropolitan area of Texas, United States. The station is under the ownership of Townsquare Media. Its studios are located on Highway 191 just west of Midland (its city of license) in rural Midland County.

KNFM broadcasts with 100,000 watts from the top of the KPEJ-TV Fox 24 tower near Gardendale and has a center of radiation of 985 feet making it the largest FM signal in the Permian Basin.
