= KODM =

Radio station in Odessa, Texas

Coordinates: 31.794°N 102.179°W

Odessa, Texas; United States
- Broadcast area: Midland-Odessa
- Frequency: 97.9 MHz
- Branding: Mix 97.9

Programming
- Format: Hot adult contemporary
- Affiliations: Compass Media Networks; Westwood One

Ownership
- Owner: Townsquare Media; (Townsquare License, LLC)
- Sister stations: KBAT, KMND, KNFM, KRIL, KZBT

History
- First air date: April 5, 1966 (as KOYL-FM)
- Former call signs: KOYL-FM (1966–1979); KUFO (1979–1985)
- Call sign meaning: K ODessa Midland

Technical information
- Licensing authority: FCC
- Facility ID: 48435
- Class: C1
- ERP: 100,000 watts
- HAAT: 110 meters

Links
- Public license information: Public file; LMS
- Webcast: Listen Live
- Website: mix979fm.com

KODM (97.9 FM "Mix 97.9") is a radio station that serves the Midland–Odessa metropolitan area with hot adult contemporary music. The station is under ownership of Townsquare Media. Its studios are located on Highway 191 just west of Midland (its city of license) in rural Midland County, and its transmitter is located midway south of Midland and Odessa.

== History ==
KOYL-FM went on the air April 5, 1966, the sister station to KOYL 1310 AM. KOYL-FM offered separate programming during the day and the AM's country format at night when 1310 was off the air. KOYL-FM broadcast with 34,000 watts horizontal polarization at 100 feet above average terrain.

In 1979, KOYL-AM-FM was sold by the Roskelleys (Mid Cities Broadcasting) to Stream Broadcasting (Harold H. "Spook" Stream III, who was married at the time to country singer Lynn Anderson). Stream also owned an FM station in Lake Charles, Louisiana. Stream leased space in a newly constructed bank building in Odessa and built new studios and production spaces. The new ownership also built a new FM transmitter facility that was more centrally located between Odessa and Midland and enabled the station to upgrade to 100,000 watts. With the upgrades, the station relaunched as KUFO-FM, becoming a popular album-oriented rock station. The manager and chief architect was Frank Hall. The program director was J. Michael Scott. The relocation of equipment was handled by Paul Easter (Houston Christian Broadcasters and Fort Bend Broadcast Services).

In the fall of 1985, Stream sold its two Odessa stations to separate owners. KUFO-FM was sold by Stream to East/West Broadcasting, formed by partners Steve Horowitz, Bill Gruber and Dick Warren. East/West relaunched the station as KODM "FM98" with a more mainstream sound. The audience that KUFO's rock format had built over the years was very loyal, and when the new KODM ownership announced it was going to change formats, much pressure was put on them to somehow save it. So, to keep the peace, a deal was made with KBAT FM to donate all of the AOR albums in the KODM library to KBAT FM, which was struggling with their ratings at the time.

Within a few months, KODM was moved from the bank building to new facilities in a strip mall called Market Place, located at University and Parkway in Odessa. Program consultant Lee Randall was contracted to re-format the programming and to position it for a broader audience with wider advertiser appeal. One of the more positive changes made was the teaming of Dave Perkins and Kathy Redwine as hosts of the morning show. Rodney Scott, an overnight DJ who stayed on from KUFO, made several "after work" morning show appearances. His contribution became so popular that he relinquished his overnight duties and became a permanent member of the morning team. Other staff disc jockeys included Kacey Caldemeyer, Keri Teegarden (from KUFO), program director Brad Holcomb, and Will Wallace. Brad's brother, Gordon, served as sales manager.

During its four-year run as an East/West Broadcasting property, "FM98" dominated the Arbitron ratings and enjoyed massive popularity among adults, particularly women. At a Business Appreciation luncheon held in May, 1987, the Odessa Chamber of Commerce honored KODM with the Business Excellence Award for 1986, citing KODM's "...firm belief in Odessa and the area's economic future." The award was presented to station partner and manager Bill Gruber by Bill Griffin, then-president of the Odessa Chamber. KODM was again sold in May 1989, to New York-based D&F Broadcasting (KROD/KLAQ in El Paso). At that time, many of its staffers moved on to other ventures; Dave Perkins was hired by WGAR FM in Cleveland, Ohio, where his morning show became one of the top five in the Cleveland market.

On April 7, 2017, KODM rebranded as "Mix 97.9", with no change in format.

== Personalities ==
Current on-air personalities include The Kidd Kraddick Morning Show, Alicia Seline, and Matt Ryan.

Former on-air personalities include Kris Moore, Justin Tate, Dina Fuentes, Ron Jeffries, Karen Carter, Lance Braden, Jim Brewer, Mark Bairrington, Keri Teegarden, Will Wallace, Dany Mojica, Rodney Scott, Steve Dimmler, Elaine Lee, Marc Gleeson, Larry Williams KUFO (1980-1982 Highest 12 week ratings sweep), Scott Sharman (Sunday morning Contemporary Christian Music), J. Michael Scott,(KUFO founding program director), and Tom Wall (who died on June 4, 2008).
