= KCRS (AM) =

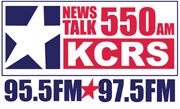
- Midland, Texas; United States
- Broadcast area: Odessa-Midland area
- Frequency: 550 kHz
- Branding: Newstalk 550

Programming
- Format: News Talk Information
- Affiliations: Fox News Radio; Compass Media Networks; Premiere Networks; Westwood One

Ownership
- Owner: ICA Broadcasting, I Ltd; (ICA Radio Midland-Odessa License, LLC)
- Sister stations: KCHX, KCRS-FM, KFZX, KMRK-FM

History
- First air date: December 20, 1935
- Call sign meaning: Clarence and Ruth Scharbauer

Technical information
- Licensing authority: FCC
- Facility ID: 42015
- Class: B
- Power: 5,000 watts day 1,000 watts night
- Transmitter coordinates: 32°4′10″N 102°1′46″W
- Translators: 95.5 K238AZ (Odessa); 97.5 K248AR (Midland)

Links
- Public license information: Public file; LMS
- Webcast: Listen Live
- Website: newstalkkcrs.com

KCRS (550 kHz), commonly called Newstalk 550 KCRS, is an AM radio station broadcasting a News Talk Information format. Licensed to Midland, Texas, United States, the station serves the Odessa-Midland area. The station is currently owned by ICA Radio Midland-Odessa License, LLC and features programming from Fox News Radio, Compass Media Networks, Premiere Networks, and Westwood One. KCRS also carries live sports for the Permian Basin. Currently the station carries the games of the Midland RockHounds of Minor League Baseball's Texas League as well as football broadcasts for the Midland High Bulldogs and the Legacy High Rebels on a rotating basis with Lonestar 92.

KCRS' studios are located at the ICA Business Plaza on East Eighth Street in Odessa, just east of downtown, and its transmitter is located in Midland.

KCRS was the leader in sports in West Texas for a time. It was the home of Sports Fan Radio Network and aired the Fabulous Sports Babe program. Until the 2009 season, KCRS was the flagship station for the RockHounds, having been their radio home since the team was first established as the Midland Cubs back in 1972. In the spring of 2009, GAP Broadcasting announced that the Rockhound games would be following OC over to 102.1 Jack FM. From 2004 to 2007 NewsTalk 550 was the affiliate for Odessa College men's and women's road basketball games, but those rights were transferred to KFZX in 2008. Before getting the OC contract, they aired 10 consecutive years of NJCAA Conference play with Midland College for both men's and women's basketball. They have also been the home for the NCAA Texas Tech Red Raiders football and men's basketball games, but the rights were moved to KMCM in 2004. They broadcast NCAA Baylor Bears football games from 1978 until 2004, when they decided to drop NCAA games altogether.

KCRS was owned by Clear Channel Communications until it sold the entire Midland-Odessa cluster to Gap Broadcasting, who in turn sold the said cluster to ICA Broadcasting for $3 million.

== FM Translators ==
KCRS relays its programming to two FM translators in order to widen the coverage area; they also provide the listener with the choice of listening on FM with high fidelity stereophonic sound.

Broadcast translators for KCRS (AM)
Call sign	Frequency	City of license	FID	ERP (W)	Class	FCC info
K238AZ	95.5 FM	Odessa, Texas	155720	250	D	LMS
K248AR	97.5 FM	Midland, Texas	149509	250	D	LMS

== Station schedule ==
Monday–Friday

- 4 am – Gordon Deal This Morning
- 6 am – The Morning Drive
- 9 am – The Lynn Woolley Show
- 11 am – Rush Limbaugh
- 2 pm – Dave Ramsey
- 5 pm – The 5 O'Clock News Block with Jesse Grimes
- 6 pm – Lars Larson
- 9 pm – Hugh Hewitt (delayed)
- 12 am – Coast to Coast AM with George Noory
