= Midland Park Mall =

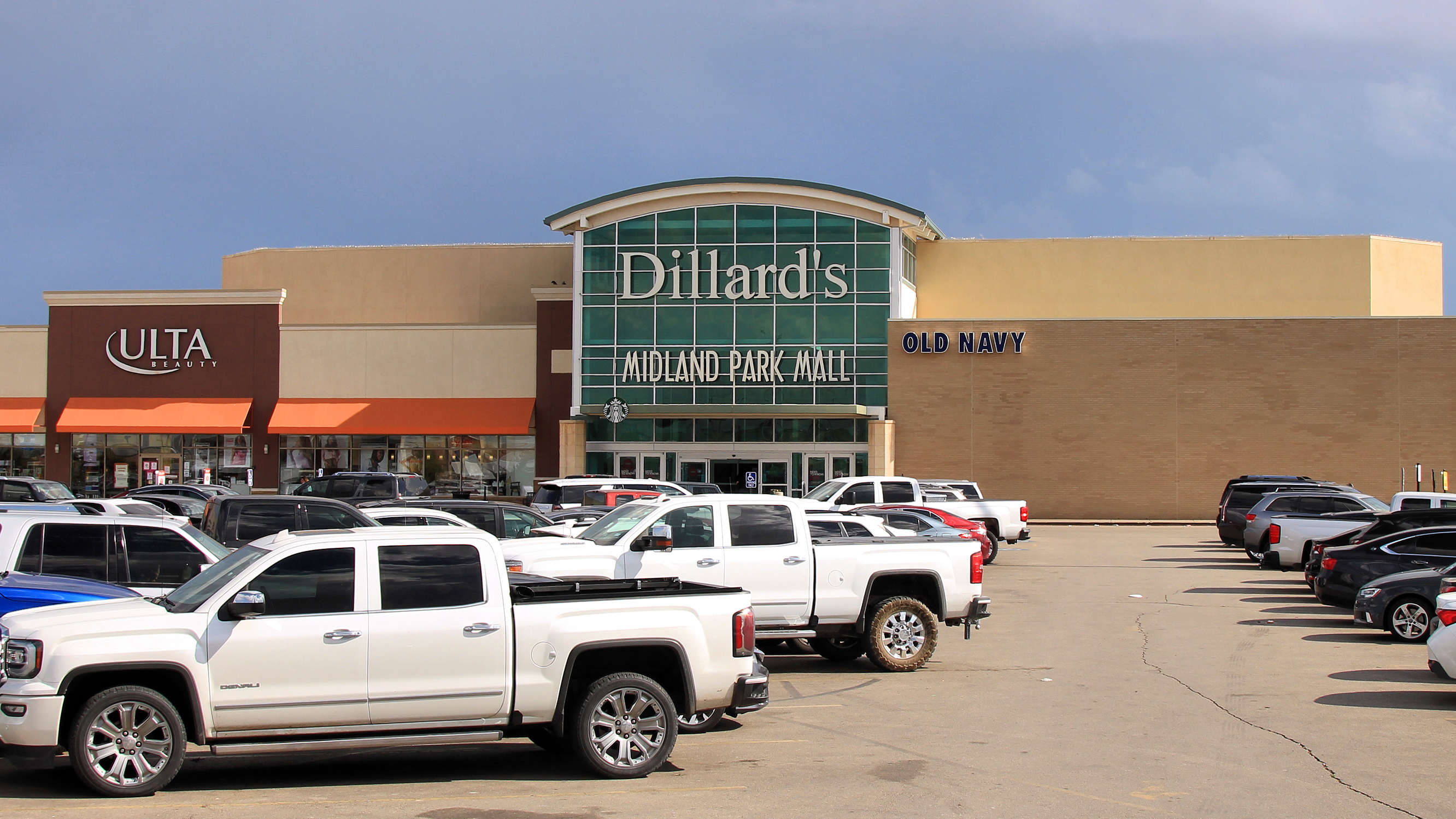
- North entrance to Midland Park Mall
- Location: Midland, Texas, United States
- Coordinates: 32.03027°N 102.13162°W
- Address: 4511 N. Midkiff Drive
- Opened: 1980
- Developer: Melvin Simon & Associates
- Owner: Simon Property Group
- Num. of stores: 89
- Num. of anchor tenants: 6 (5 open, 1 under redevelopment)
- Floor area: 635,788 sq ft (59,066.6 m^{2})
- Floors: 1

Midland Park Mall is an enclosed shopping mall in Midland, Texas, United States. Opened in 1980, it is anchored by two Dillard's stores (the women's store was originally Sears), JCPenney, Dick's Sporting Goods (originally Dillard's Woman store) and Ross Dress for Less.

== History ==
Midland Park Mall opened in 1980. At its grand opening, the food court had ash trays that read "Stolen from Midland Park Mall". Within 6 weeks all remaining ash trays simply said, "Midland Park Mall". Due to low unemployment, Dillard's had difficulty finding sufficient employees in its first years of operation at the mall. Sakowitz was an original tenant of Midland Park Mall, closing in 1982. In 2003, the mall changed managers to one who had previously managed Dadeland Mall in Miami, Florida.

Gap closed in 2009, although Vanity (which closed in 2017) and a food court tenant opened. Other expansions included Charlotte Russe, Zumiez, and Ulta.

On January 4, 2018, Sears announced that its store at the mall would be closing as part of a plan to close 103 stores nationwide. The store closed on April 8, 2018, making it the last original anchor store to close. On April 9, 2018, Simon announced plans to re-purpose the Sears. It's one of the five malls owned by Simon that had Sears closed planned to be redeveloped. Potential stores in the mall expansion could include Express and The Cheesecake Factory. In 2019, Dillard's moved its women's departments to the former Sears and moved its men's departments from the former location, originally a Sakowitz, to the original women's location. On October 25, 2019, it was announced that Dick's Sporting Goods would open in the former Sakowitz/Dillard's Men's location in summer 2020.
