= Arcade =

Arcade most often refers to:

- Arcade game, a coin-operated video, pinball, electro-mechanical, redemption, etc., game
  - Arcade video game, a coin-operated video game
  - Arcade cabinet, housing which holds an arcade video game's hardware
  - Arcade system board, a standardized printed circuit board
- Amusement arcade, a place with arcade games

Arcade may also refer to:

== Architecture ==
- Arcade (architecture), a series of adjoining arches
- Shopping mall, one or more buildings forming a complex of shops, sometimes called a shopping arcade

== Places ==
=== Greece ===
- Arcades (Crete), a town and city-state of ancient Crete

=== Italy ===
- Arcade, Italy, a town and commune in the region of Veneto

=== United Kingdom ===
- Arcade Club, an amusement arcade chain

=== United States ===
- Arcade, Georgia, a city in Jackson County
- Arcade, New York, a town in Wyoming County
- Arcade (village), New York, a village in Wyoming County
- Arcade, Texas, an unincorporated community in Ector County
- Arden-Arcade, California, a census-designated place in Sacramento County
- Arcade Building (Asheville, North Carolina)
- The Arcade (Cleveland), a historic building in Ohio
- The Arcade (Oak Bluffs, Massachusetts), a historic site in Oak Bluffs, Massachusetts
- The Arcade (Providence, Rhode Island), a historic shopping center

== Arts and entertainment ==
=== Books and comics ===
- Arcades (Milton), a 1634 masque by John Milton
- Arcade (architecture magazine), quarterly magazine about architecture
- Arcade Publishing, an American publishing company
- Arcade Comics, an independent comic book company founded by Rob Liefeld and Jimmy Jay
- Arcade (Marvel Comics), a supervillain of the Marvel Universe
- Arcade (comics magazine), an underground comics anthology edited by Bill Griffith and Art Spiegelman
- Arcade, video games magazine published by Future Publishing

=== Film and television ===
- Arcade (film), a 1993 movie starring Peter Billingsley as a teenage virtual reality addict
- Arcade (TV series), a short-lived Australian soap opera produced in 1980
- Nick Arcade, a game show that aired on the Nickelodeon television channel from 1992 to 1993

=== Gaming ===
- Apple Arcade, a video game subscription service by Apple Inc.
- The Arcade (joystick), a popular joystick
- Xbox Live Arcade, a video game download distribution line
- Xbox 360 Arcade, a version of the Xbox 360 home console
- GameSpy Arcade, online gaming through GameSpy Network, similar to Battle.net
- The Arcade (company), workspace in Melbourne, Australia
- RealArcade, a defunct gaming service from RealNetworks

=== Music ===
==== Albums ====
- Arcade (Arcade album), 1993
- Arcade (John Abercrombie album), 1979
- Arcade, a 2002 album by Machinae Supremacy
- The Arcade, a 2008 album by Hyper Crush

==== Songs ====
- "Arcade" (song), by Dutch singer Duncan Laurence that won the 2019 Eurovision Song Contest
- "Arcades", by C2C from Tetra (album)
- "Arcades", by Hell Is for Heroes from Hell Is for Heroes (album)

==== Other uses in music ====
- Arcade (ballet), by John Taras 1963
- Arcade (band), a rock band formed by ex-Ratt vocalist Stephen Pearcy
- The Arcade (producers), a grammy-nominated music production duo from London
- Arcade Records, a record label

== Other uses ==
- Arterial arcades, small intestinal arteries, in anatomy
- ARCADE, Absolute Radiometer for Cosmology, Astrophysics, and Diffuse Emission, a radiometer to explore the cosmos
- Adult video arcade
- Exchange Arcade, the commercial section of the Nottingham Council House
- Shreepati Arcade, one of India's tallest buildings
- Arcade, a bundle of coronal loops in solar physics; see Supra-arcade downflows
- Arcade Theatre, in Los Angeles, California
- Arcade Building (disambiguation)

== See also ==
- Arcadia (disambiguation)
