= Maimai (video game series) =

2012 rhythm game series

- Maimai and Maimai DX logos
- Developer: Sega
- Publisher: Sega
- Composer: Hiroshi Kawaguchi
- Series: Performai
- Engine: teaGFX (original to Finale); Unity (DX)
- Platform: Arcade
- Release: Versions: Maimai; JP: 11 July 2012; CN: September 2012 Plus; JP: 13 December 2012 Green; JP: 11 July 2013 Green Plus; JP: 26 February 2014 Orange; JP: 18 September 2014 Orange Plus; JP: 19 March 2015 Pink; JP: 10 December 2015; IDN: 8 March 2016 Pink Plus; JP: 30 June 2016; IDN: 22 July 2016; US: 14 January 2017 Murasaki; JP: 15 December 2016; IDN: 14 January 2017 Murasaki Plus; JP: 22 June 2017; SGP: 22 June 2017; IDN: 13 July 2017 Milk; JP: 14 December 2017; SGP: 14 December 2017; IDN: 1 January 2018 Milk Plus; JP: 21 June 2018; SGP: 21 June 2018; IDN: 10 July 2018 Finale; JP: 13 December 2018; SGP: 13 December 2018; IDN: 29 December 2018 DX; JP: 11 July 2019; CN: 5 December 2019; IDN: 23 January 2020 DX Plus; JP: 23 January 2020; WW: 29 July 2020 DX Splash; JP: 17 September 2020; WW: 29 January 2021; CN: 28 April 2021 (DX2021) DX Splash Plus; JP: 18 March 2021; WW: 30 July 2021 DX Universe; JP: 16 September 2021; WW: 27 January 2022; CN: 23 June 2022 (DX2022) DX Universe Plus; JP: 24 March 2022; WW: 28 July 2022 DX Festival; JP: 15 September 2022; WW: 19 January 2023; CN: 8 June 2023 (DX2023) DX Festival Plus; JP: 23 March 2023; WW: 27 July 2023 DX Buddies; JP: 14 September 2023; WW: 18 January 2024; US: 24 May 2024 (test run); CN: 6 June 2024 (DX2024) DX Buddies Plus; JP: 21 March 2024; WW: 25 July 2024 DX Prism; JP: 12 September 2024; WW: 16 January 2025; CN: 11 June 2025 (DX2025) DX Prism Plus; JP: 13 March 2025; WW: 24 July 2025; US: 18 September 2025; CN: 10 June 2026 (DX2026) DX Circle; JP: 18 September 2025; WW: 22 January 2026 DX Circle Plus; JP: 19 March 2026; WW: 23 July 2026 DX Magical; JP: 17 September 2026; WW: TBA
- Genre: Rhythm game
- Modes: Single-player, multiplayer (up to 4 players with cabinet-to-cabinet play)
- Arcade system: RingEdge 2 (original to Finale); ALLS (DX above)

Maimai (stylized in all lowercase) is an arcade rhythm game series developed and distributed by Sega, in which players hit notes using eight buttons or the touchscreen. The game supports both single-player and multiplayer gameplay with up to 2 players per cabinet, or 4 players with cabinet-to-cabinet play. The game is mainly available in Japan, with an English-language version available to overseas regions including Southeast Asia, Taiwan, Hong Kong, South Korea, Australia, New Zealand, the United States, and Canada, and a simplified Chinese version for China.

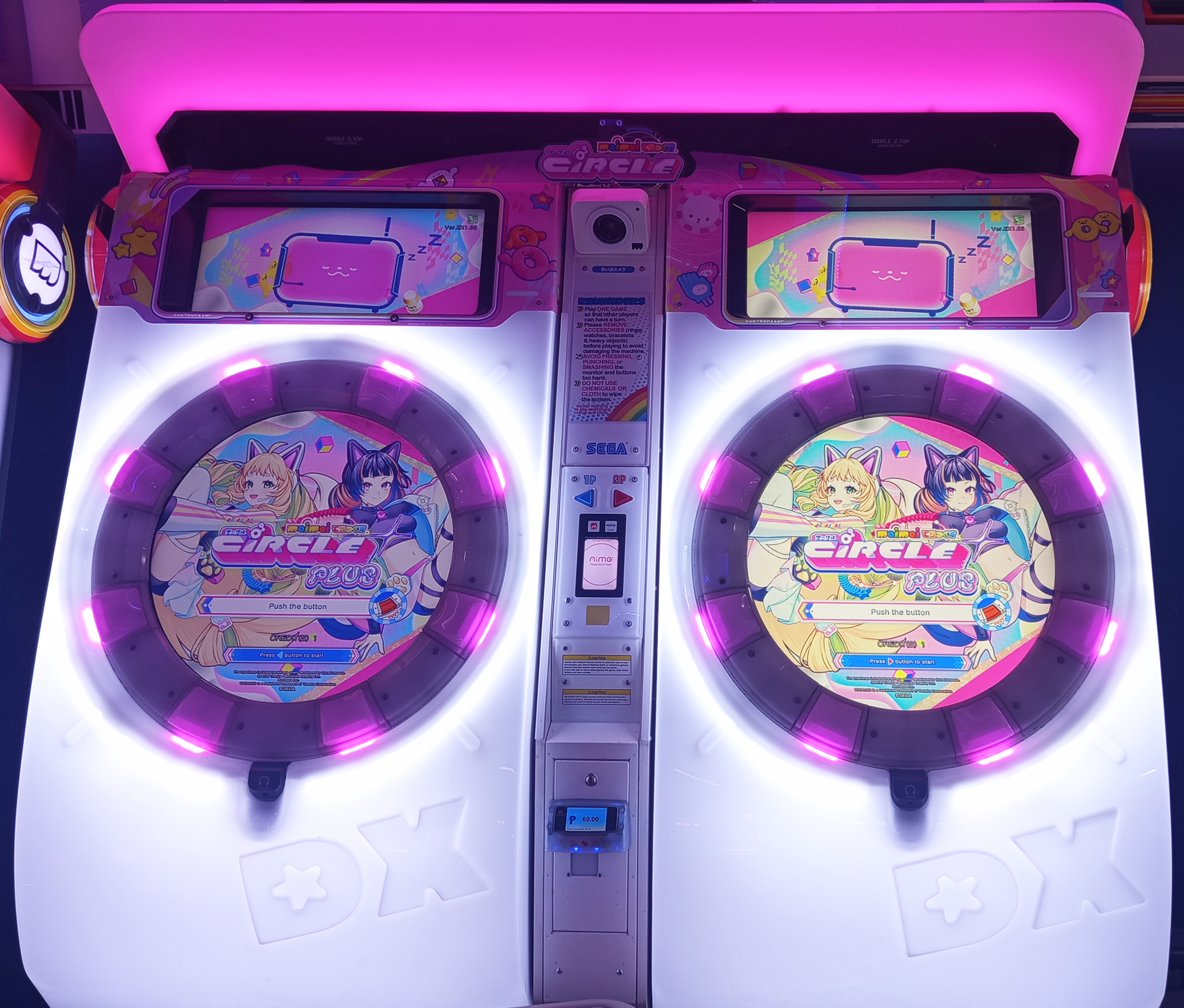
A Maimai DX cabinet running the latest international update, CiRCLE PLUS, in Mandaluyong, Philippines, 2026

== Versions ==
The Pink Plus version of the game was location tested in the United States at Dave & Buster's in Irvine in December 2016, and at Round 1 in Puente Hills in January 2017.

In July 2019, Sega released Maimai DX (Deluxe), a reworked version of the game featuring new second-generation cabinets. After the pre-DX 'classic' cabinets were taken offline in September 2019, many were shipped to Europe and North America, running the FiNALE version. In the US, several of these cabinets were installed at Round 1 locations in 2021, while in Europe, arcades such as Arcade Club began to install them starting around 2020.

The international version of Maimai DX BUDDiES underwent location tests in the United States, with appearances at Round 1 in Puente Hills (24 May to 14 July 2024), Dave & Buster's in Dallas (6 August to 24 November 2024), and Velocity Esports in Schaumburg (20 December 2024 until the store's closure on 5 March 2025).

Following these tests, Sega showcased Maimai DX at Amusement Expo International 2025 in Las Vegas on March 19 and 20, acting as the game's official Western debut. From September that year, cabinets began officially shipping to Round 1 locations across the United States, starting in California. Cabinets have also been shipped to other American arcades, including Dave & Buster’s and Kiddleton locations.

== Gameplay ==
Demonstration of the interface and gameplay of Maimai. This clip features all basic note types: Tap, Hold, Slide, Touch and Touch Hold, as well as their variants Paired and Break.

=== Overview ===
The defining feature of Maimai's arcade cabinet is its striking resemblance to a front-loading washing machine. Early advertisements and promotional materials contained different joke catchphrases, such as 'It's not a washing machine!' and 'No water.' At its first deployment test, Maimai had 'No washing' written on its cabinet. Up to 2 players can play together per cabinet, and up to 4 with a second cabinet. The original design was revealed to have been made in collaboration with Sharp in Sega's Maimai LIVE 2014 Washing Festival event.

Since the cabinet uses only one computer for both players, if a player is already playing on a machine, the second player's input will not work at all until the end of the game.

Various kinds of notes will appear at the center and approach the outer rim of the circular touchscreen. The player must tap, hold, or slide on the touchscreen or surrounding buttons in time with the music, depending on the type of note.

There are 5 types of input-timing judgements (ranging from least to most accurately timed): 'Miss', 'Good', 'Great', 'Perfect', and 'Critical Perfect', and may be set to also show 'Late' or 'Early'. In-game settings (Note: The default setting shows only four judgements: 'Miss', 'Good', 'Great', and 'Perfect', and lack 'Late' and 'Early' specifiers.) can be toggled to enable different displays to show the different types of judgements based on the player's preference.

Like other touch-based arcade rhythm games, such as Chunithm and Wacca, many players wear gloves during gameplay to dampen the impact of hitting buttons and allow for easier sliding on the screen's surface, as well as minimize injuries caused by friction, especially while playing at higher difficulties.

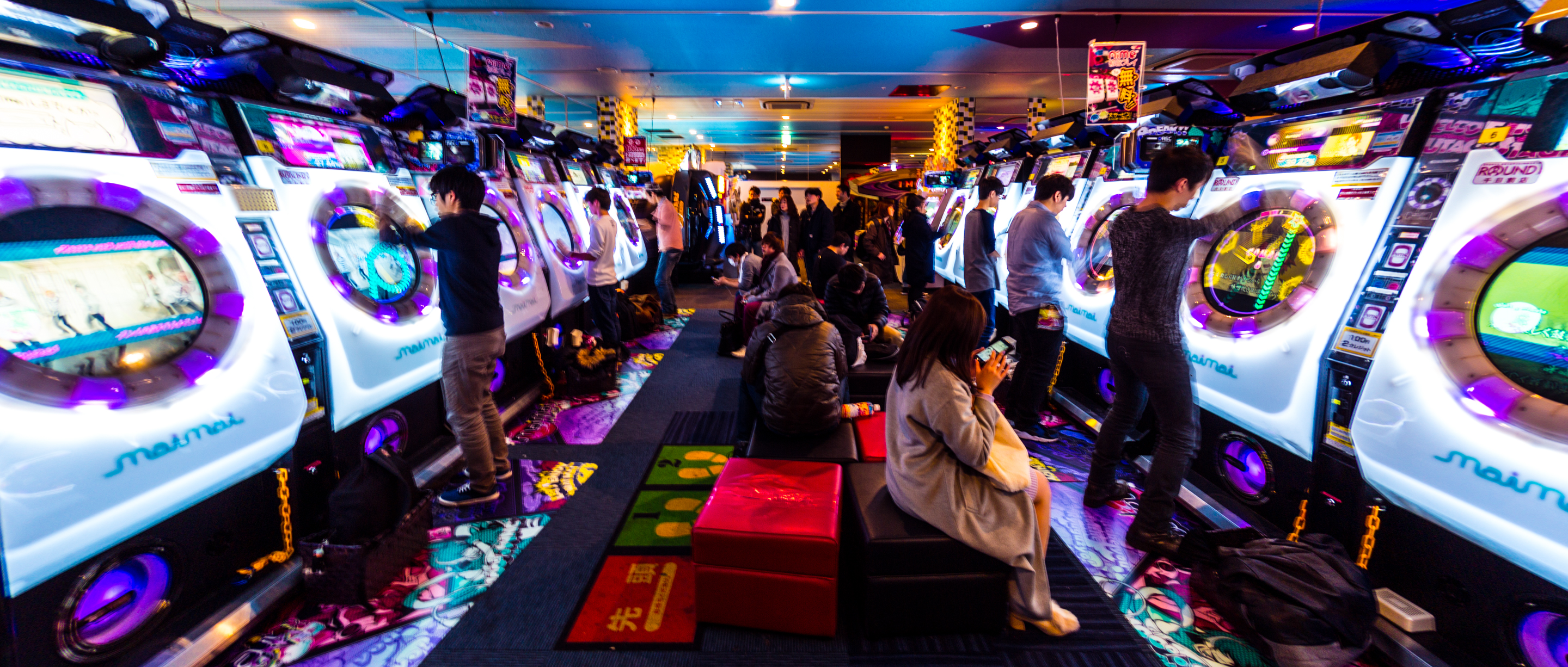
Since the MURASAKi PLUS update (MURASAKi cabs shown), players can play songs with other players on a second local cabinet in real time.

=== Songs ===
The game's song library is regularly updated and sorted into categories based on where they originated, with the main categories being:

- Pops & Anime: J-pop, VTuber songs and anime soundtracks released under mainstream labels.
- Niconico & Vocaloid: Songs originally uploaded to Niconico, or using a voice synthesizer such as Vocaloid, CeVIO AI, or Synthesizer V.
- Touhou Project (東方Project): Arrangements of soundtracks from the Touhou Project bullet hell franchise.
- Game & Variety: Songs originating from other games, as well as independently released music.
- Maimai: Songs exclusively commissioned for Maimai.
- Ongeki & Chunithm: Songs originating from Ongeki and Chunithm, two other rhythm games also developed by Sega.

Each song has four or five playable charts at varying levels of difficulty. The four base difficulty levels are Basic, Advanced, Expert, and Master. There was also a fifth 'Easy' difficulty below Basic, but it was removed entirely in DX. Some songs have an additional "Re:Master" chart which may be added either on release or in a later version.

Every chart is also assigned a numerical level from 1 to 15. With the exception of levels 1-6 and 15, there is also a harder '+' equivalent for each level (e.g., 7+, 9+, 11+,...). Since BUDDiES PLUS, the + label is for charts where the internal level difficulty has a decimal of .6 or higher (7.6 to 7.9 are 7+).

=== Scoring ===
Maimai's scoring system involves alphabetical ranks decided by a percentage score calculated based on the player's cumulative note judgements. To "clear" a song, players must score at least 80% for an A rank. Since Maimai DX, the alphabetical ranking system ranges from D to SSS+. The maximum possible percentage obtainable, achieved when a player hits all notes as Perfect or higher while hitting all 'Break' notes with Critical Perfect, is 101%, officially named an "All Perfect+" since MiLK Plus.

Every chart is assigned a "rating" number based on its difficulty, which ends with a hidden internal decimal constant. The game's songs are split into old and new categories for a player's rating calculation; songs released within the previous and current version of the game are considered new songs, while songs released in past versions are considered old songs (including Re:Master charts added for old songs during a "new song" version). The player's rating is calculated as the sum of the ratings of the top 15 new songs and top 35 old songs. Rating numbers are displayed alongside the player's username, and unique badges are assigned to certain rating ranges. As of CiRCLE, achieving "All Perfect" on a chart gives it one additional rating point.

=== Grade Certification ===
Grade Certification (段位認定, dan'i nintei; also known as Dan Certification or simply Dan, formerly known in FiNALE as FiNALE Course and Survival Course in MiLK and MiLK PLUS) is an alternate game mode where players have to complete a course of four charts without reducing their life to 0. Each course starts with a certain amount of life, and decreases for each non-Perfect judgement. During gameplay, the center of the display will show the current remaining life. During intermissions, if the previous song was cleared (achieved A rank or higher), the player is awarded bonus life (amount cannot exceed the initial maximum). If the life counter reaches 0, the course will still continue until the end (except in True Dan courses), but is considered failed, and no more life bonuses are given.

Since Splash PLUS, players can choose between Regular Grade Certification courses, with ten predetermined courses, and Random Grade Certification courses, eight courses with a randomized selection of charts determined by its difficulty, with four courses for each difficulty.

It is not to be confused with another alternative game mode with the same name present from PiNK PLUS to MiLK PLUS, in which the player needs to clear every song with S rank in the chosen course.

==== Regular Grade Certification ====
In Regular Grade Certification, the category is divided into 10 courses, each increasing in difficulty. When the player passes a course higher than their best, the corresponding Grade Certification badge can be displayed on the player's nameplate.

==== True Grade Certification ====
After a player clears the tenth Grade Certification course, True Grade Certification (真段位認定, shin dan'i nintei; formerly known as Secret Grade Certification in Finale Course) is unlocked the next time the player enters Grade Certification. True Grade Certification is similar to Regular Grade Certification: ten increasingly difficult courses with an extra "Master" course (真皆伝, shin kaiden; in-game FiNALE Course lacks this) after the tenth True Dan. All courses have 50 life, −2 penalty for Great, −3 for Good, and −5 for Miss, and only a 10 life bonus between charts (5 life bonus on True Master Dan). When the life counter reaches 0 in these courses, the game ends immediately. When a True Dan course is passed, along with an updated badge, a nameplate corresponding to the course is awarded, which the player can display on their sub-monitor above.

After clearing True Master Dan, a new course is introduced on the next play of Grade Certification mode, called Hidden Master Dan (裏皆伝, ura kaiden), where players endure four of the hardest songs in the game with only 10 life. As they will incur a penalty of -1 for Great, -3 for Good, and -10 for Miss (instantly failing the course)—and no regeneration between charts—players must achieve a near-perfect run to clear this course.

==== Random Grade Certification ====
In a Random Grade Certification course, four random charts are chosen (charts can repeat in this category) based on the difficulty chosen: Expert or Master (Random Master courses can include Re:Master charts), split into four difficulties, each only choosing charts within a level and difficulty range. The amount of life given for the course decreases for each course difficulty. Unlike the other categories, no badge is awarded for clearing a Random course.

=== Challenges ===
Throughout the series, there have been challenges that are or were present in some versions of Maimai.

==== Perfect Challenge ====
Perfect Challenge (introduced in Splash) is a challenge where the player has to clear a predetermined song of a ちほー, or area, without fully depleting a set amount of life (similar to Grade Certification). Each non-perfect judgment reduces life by one, and the track ends immediately when life reaches 0. The amount of life for a Perfect Challenge starts at 1 and increases over time, usually a few days.

==== Pandora Boxxx ====
Pandora Boxxx (stylized in all caps) was a four-stage challenge exclusive to Maimai FiNALE, which ran from December 18th, 2018 up until FiNALE's online service closure. When a player clears a set song in each of the six phases of Stage 1, they unlock the song for use in regular play and receive an emblem for the corresponding song after achieving an SS rank. After players collected all six emblems for the first time, the next time players played Pandora Boxxx, they automatically entered Stage 2 and played the Master chart of "Pandora Paradoxxx" (stylized in all caps) by Sakuzyo, costing all emblems for the difficulty chosen. All subsequent sessions in Pandora Boxxx after obtaining the emblems do not force the player to play Pandora Paradoxxx. After clearing Pandora Paradoxxx, players progress to Stage 3, where players have to play all six songs from Stage 1 again in Re:Master difficulty; similarly, for Stage 4, players play the Re:Master chart of Pandora Paradoxxx. At level 15, it is one of three charts with the highest difficulty level in the game. After the player clears Stage 4, the challenge is complete, and a bonus song plays.

==== Kaleidxscope ====
Kaleidxscope (stylized as KALEID×SCOPE and pronounced "kaleidoscope") was a challenge starting in PRiSM and ending in PRiSM PLUS. It was available to play exclusively from PRiSM to CiRCLE, and was discontinued in CiRCLE PLUS. It is split into five Phases, with the first Phase further separated into six stages for the first six gates.

To unlock each gate, players must complete the gate's corresponding Area and, until CiRCLE, obtain a key through hidden requirements. Players may enter unlocked gates and play their respective Kaleidxscope course, akin to a Grade Certification course, albeit with three songs instead of four. Unlike in Pandora Boxxx, gate clears are permanent and are not separated between difficulties, but only the highest difficulty can be chosen at the start of the gate's announcement, and lower difficulties are unlocked as life counters are relaxed. The six gates of Phase 1 are:

- Blue Gate, unlocked by completing "Sky Street Area 6" and playing all twenty-nine Youth Area tracks.
- White Gate, unlocked by completing "Heaven Area 8", equipping the Latent Kingdom frame, and playing one set consisting of only songs by Kanon Oguni.
- Violet Gate, unlocked by completing "Black Rose Area 10", setting the character Owl as the tour leader, and playing songs only from Kotonoha Project.
- Black Gate, unlocked by completing "Metropolis Area 9" and playing all Japanese King of Performai qualifier and finale songs.
- Yellow Gate, unlocked by completing the "Hajimari Area" and using the "Random Song" feature to roll and play one chart from a set of predetermined charts.
- Red Gate, unlocked by completing "Dragon Area 4" and playing all songs that either explicitly have "dragon" in their title or originated from the Yakuza (Like a Dragon) game franchise.

After all gates were completed, Phase 2 was unlocked, starting with Prism Tower, which was unlocked after completing "7sRef Area 4". After completing the Prism Tower stage, the player can play Phase ERROR, a Kaleidxscope course. The final song appeared glitched without a title, difficulty, or artist, and at the end, impossible patterns of notes would flood the screen, and the cabinet would supposedly "crash", displaying a blue screen of death. After this, Phase 2 ends and the glitched song is no longer accessible.

Phase 3 of Kaleidxscope began after enough people entered the error code displayed on the blue screen after the "crash", which began a livestream showcasing the music video for After Pandora, the sequel to Pandora Paradoxxx. After the livestream ended, the Gate of Hope opened as a Kaleidxscope course, ending with After Pandora.

After clearing the Gate of Hope, players may access the final phase of Kaleidxscope, the song Xaleid◆scopix by Xi. Upon starting, a cutscene plays, the song reveals its name and artist, and enters its Re:Master form (if it was the selected difficulty). After clearing Xaleid◆scopix, the cabinet displays a special artwork, thanking the player and congratulating them on completing Kaleidxscope, and a bonus song plays.

=== Maimai DX NET ===
Maimai DX NET (formerly Maimai NET) is Maimai's website for players to access their account. To enable these services, a Sega ID or another IC card with play data must be linked. Players can use an 'Aime' IC card or Osaifu-Keitai compatible phone with the machine to log into their account. (Note: Except for mainland China, where players are required to log in with a QR code generated by the official WeChat account.) From 25 October 2018 onwards, with the introduction of the Amusement IC standard, IC cards from other developers such as 'e-Amusement' and 'Bandai Namco Passport' cards will also work with Maimai.

Players can access Maimai DX NET to view detailed information on their account, such as scores and achievements, as well as manage their settings. It was possible to link a niconico account to upload a recording of one play from the built-in camera. This integration was removed with the release of Maimai DX in 2019, and replaced with a static camera to save a commemorative photo at the end of a game, which would become accessible on Maimai DX NET. The camera is not available on the North American release of the game.

==== Incidents ====
===== 2026 server cyberattack =====
See ALL.Net/2026 server cyberattack

== Series ==
The following are release dates for Japan only.

- Maimai – the first version of the first generation Maimai cabinet, released 11 July 2012
- Maimai PLUS – released 13 December 2012
- Maimai GreeN – released 11 July 2013
- Maimai GreeN PLUS – began location tests on 31 January 2014 and was officially released on 26 February the same year
- Maimai ORANGE – released 18 September 2014
- Maimai ORANGE PLUS – released 19 March 2015
- Maimai PiNK – released 9 December 2015
- Maimai PiNK PLUS – released 30 July 2016
- Maimai MURASAKi – released 15 December 2016
- Maimai MURASAKi PLUS – released 22 June 2017
- Maimai MiLK – released 14 December 2017
- Maimai MiLK PLUS – released 21 June 2018
- Maimai FiNALE – the last version of the first-generation cabinet, released 13 December 2018. Official online service in Japan ended on 3 September 2019.
- Maimai DX – the first version of the second-generation Maimai cabinet, released 11 July 2019
- Maimai DX PLUS – released 23 January 2020
- Maimai DX Splash – released 17 September 2020
- Maimai DX Splash PLUS – released 18 March 2021
- Maimai DX UNiVERSE – released 16 September 2021
- Maimai DX UNiVERSE PLUS – released 24 March 2022
- Maimai DX FESTiVAL – released 15 September 2022
- Maimai DX FESTiVAL PLUS – released 23 March 2023
- Maimai DX BUDDiES – released 14 September 2023
- Maimai DX BUDDiES PLUS – released 21 March 2024
- Maimai DX PRiSM – released 12 September 2024
- Maimai DX PRiSM PLUS – released 13 March 2025
- Maimai DX CiRCLE – released 18 September 2025
- Maimai DX CiRCLE PLUS - released 19 March 2026
- Maimai DX MAGiCAL - released 9 September 2026

== Characters ==
Derakkuma (でらっくま)
Voiced by: Suzuko Mimori

Kanadera (カナデラ)
Voiced by: Asaki Yuikawa

Milk (みーるく, Miiruku)
Voiced by: Asuka Ito

Shama (しゃま)
Voiced by: Atsumi Tanezaki

Otohime (乙姫)
Voiced by: Yū Asakawa

Ras (ラズ, Razu)
Voiced by: Ayane Sakura

Chiffon (シフォン, Shifon)
Voiced by: Mako

Salt (ソルト, Soruto)
Voiced by: Hiromi Igarashi

== Gallery ==
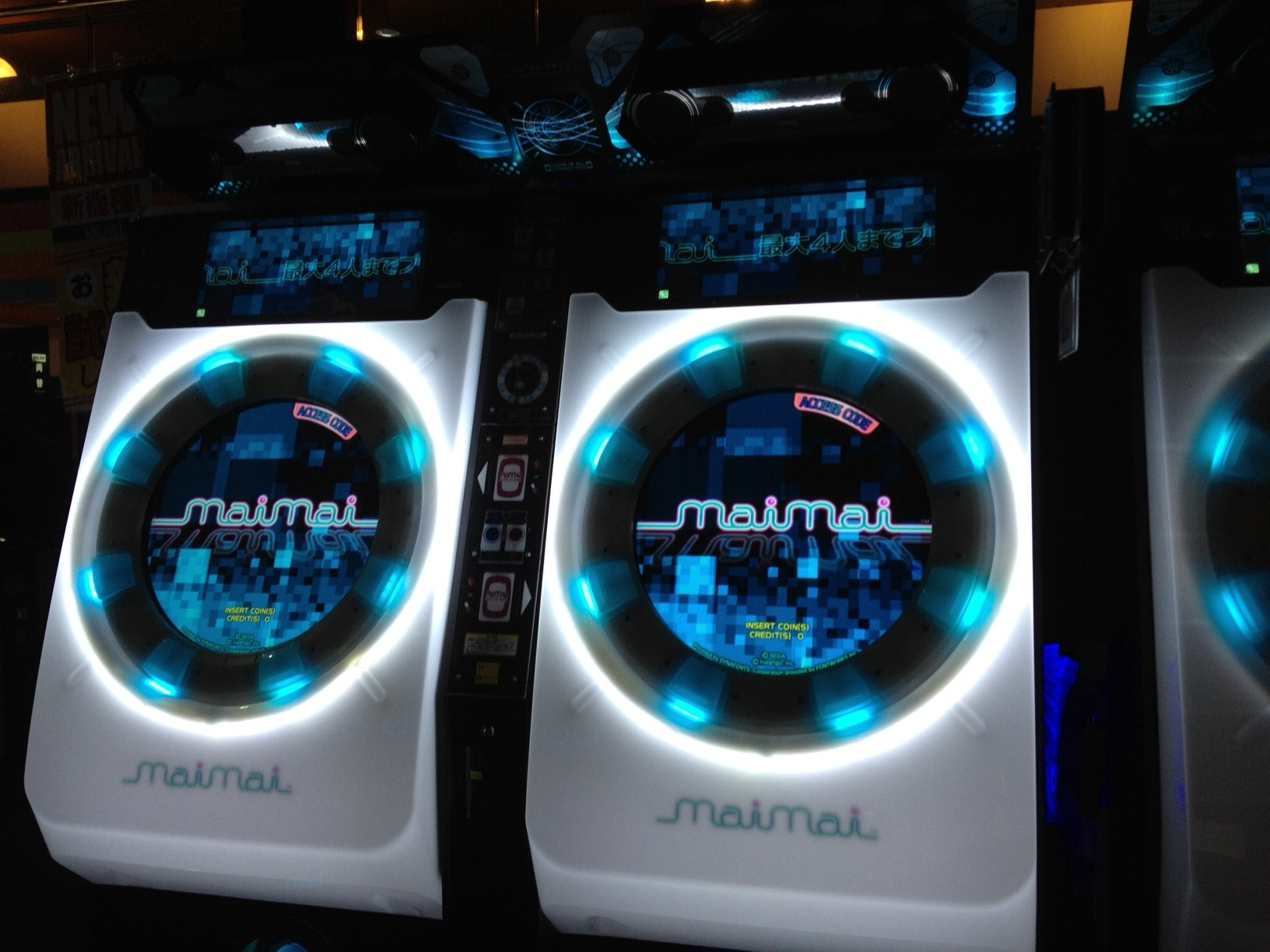
First generation Maimai cabinets in Japan, 2012

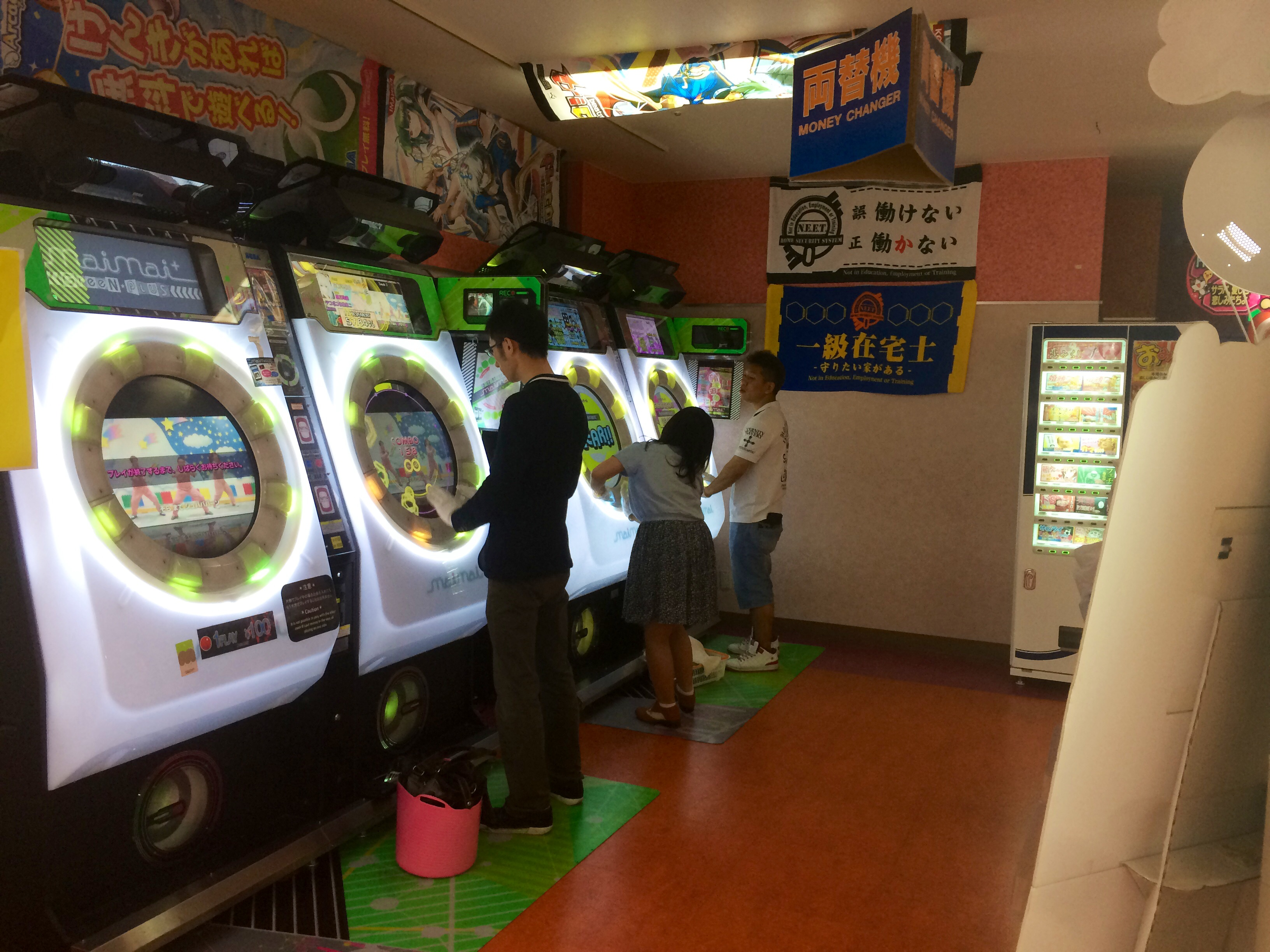
Three people playing on GreeN PLUS cabinets in Japan, 2014

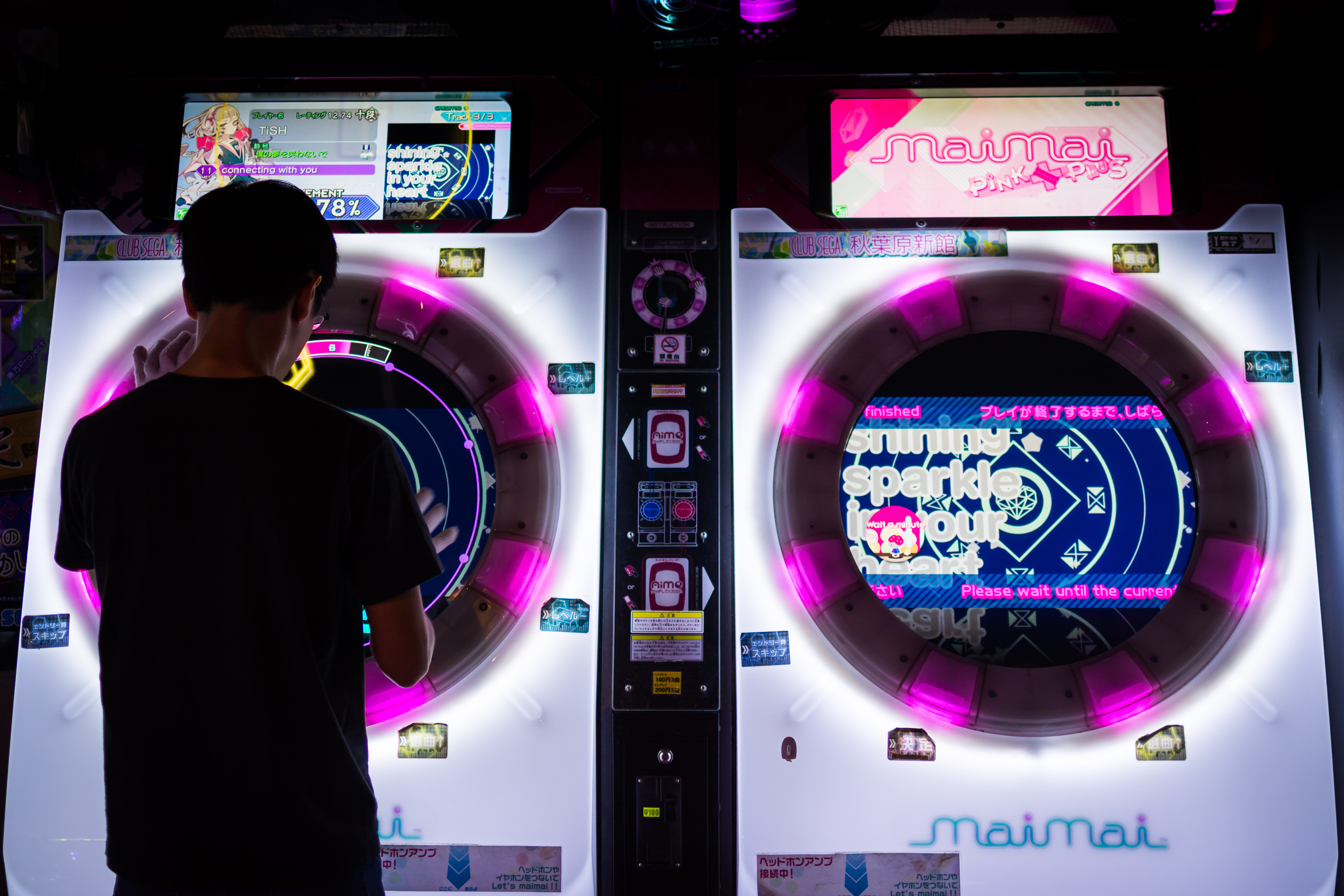
A man playing PiNK PLUS in Japan, July 2016

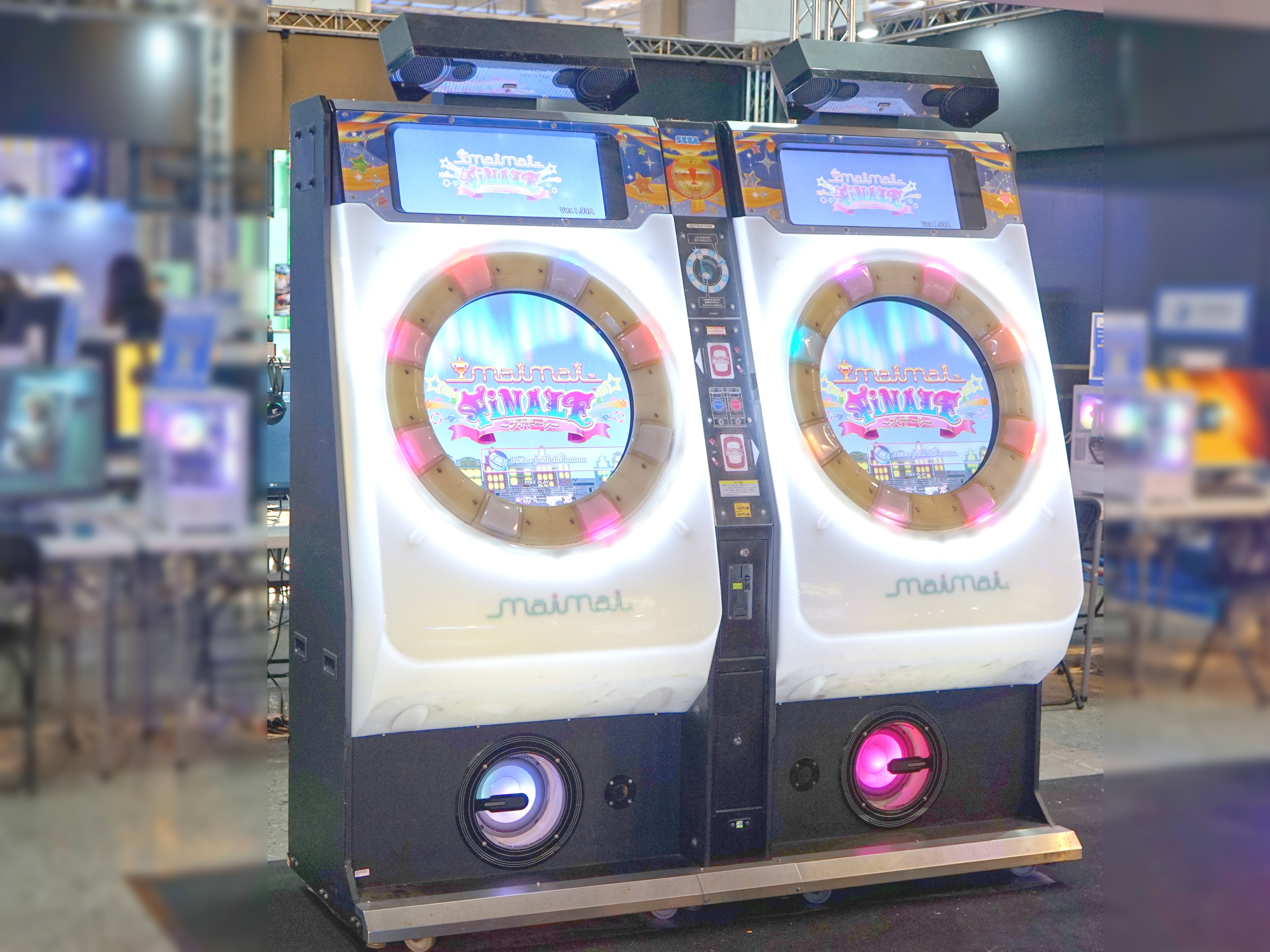
FiNALE cabinet in Taipei, Taiwan, 2025.

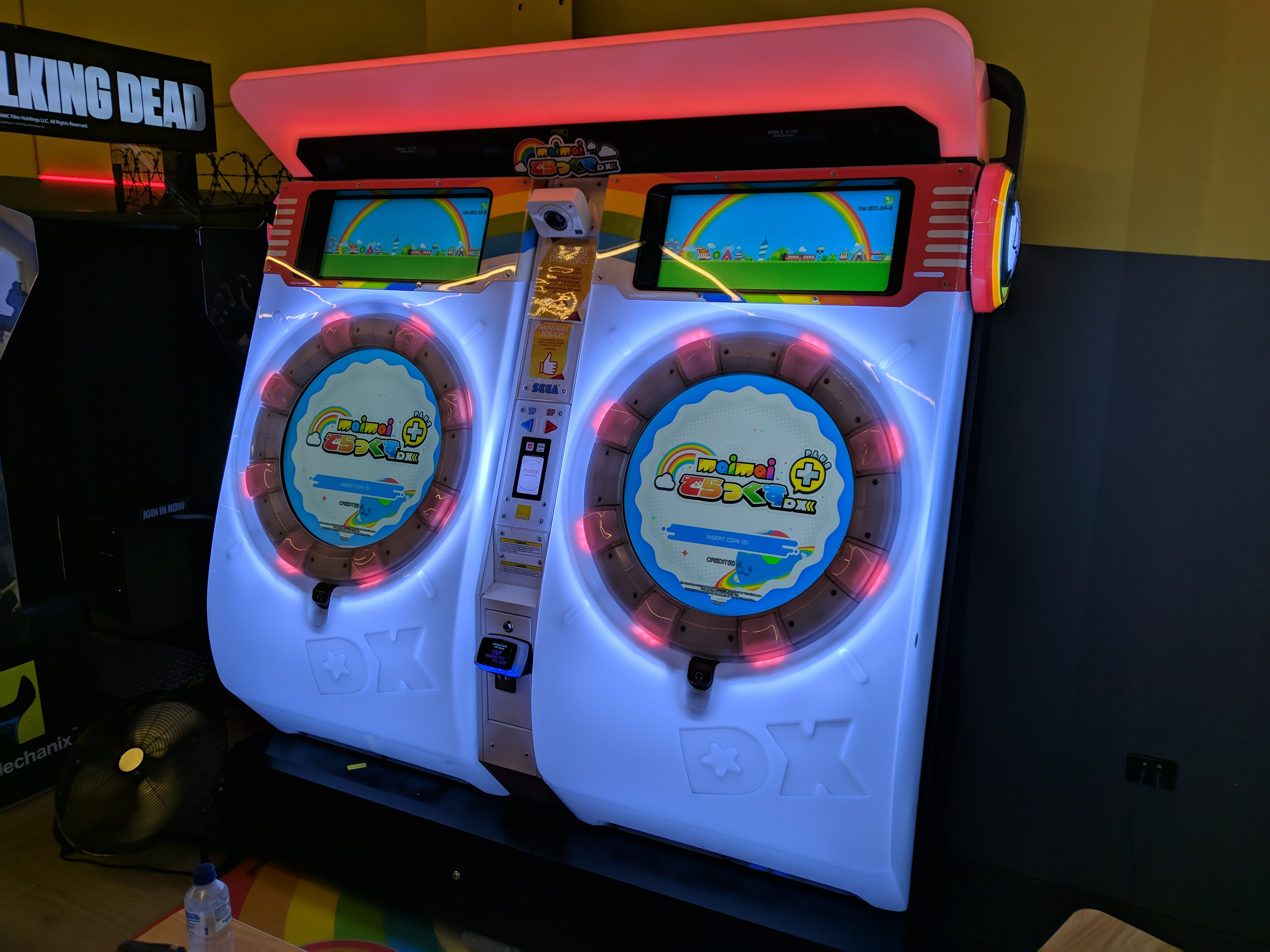
DX PLUS cabinet in Sydney, Australia, 2020

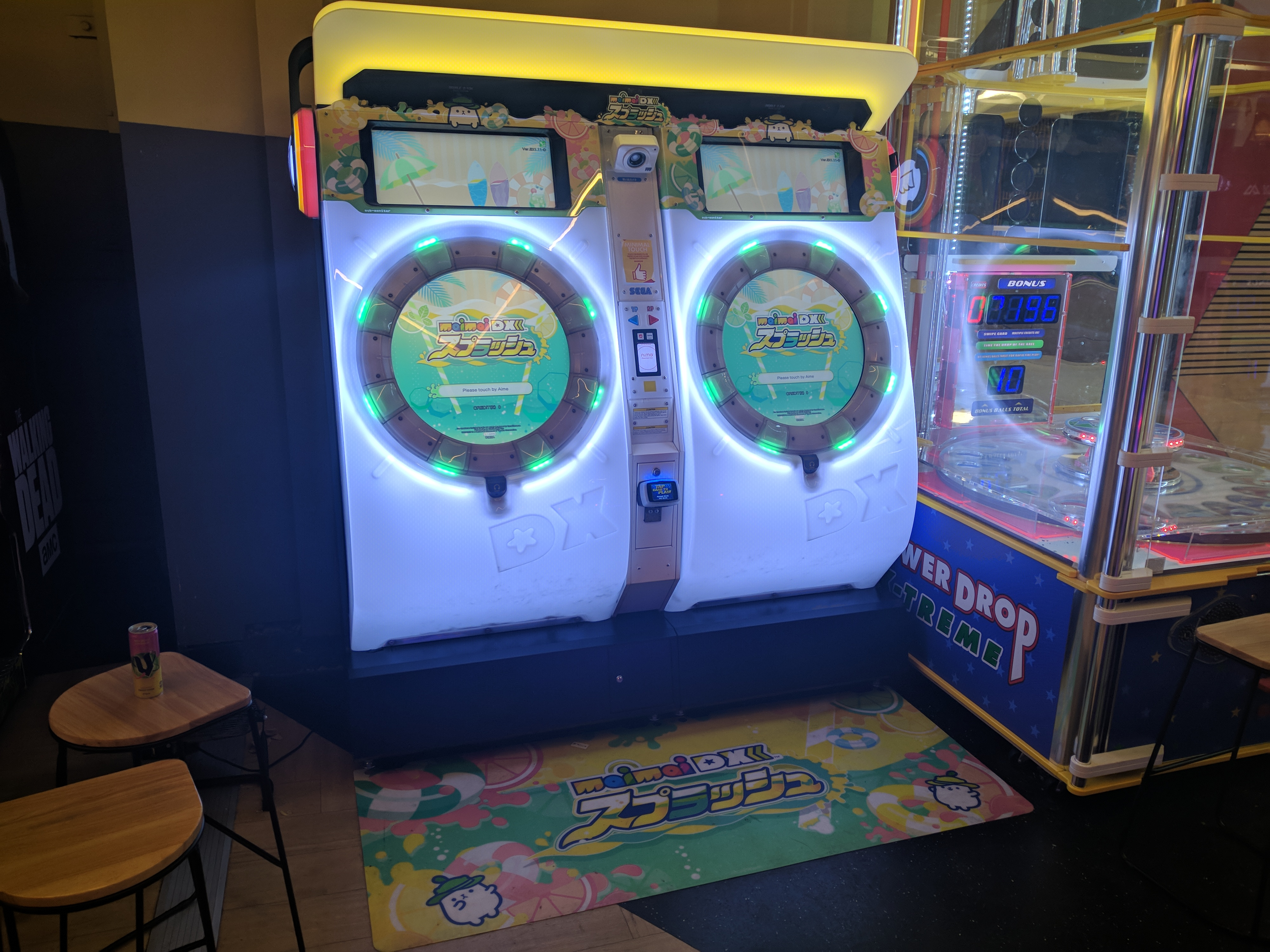
The same cabinet running DX Splash, 2021

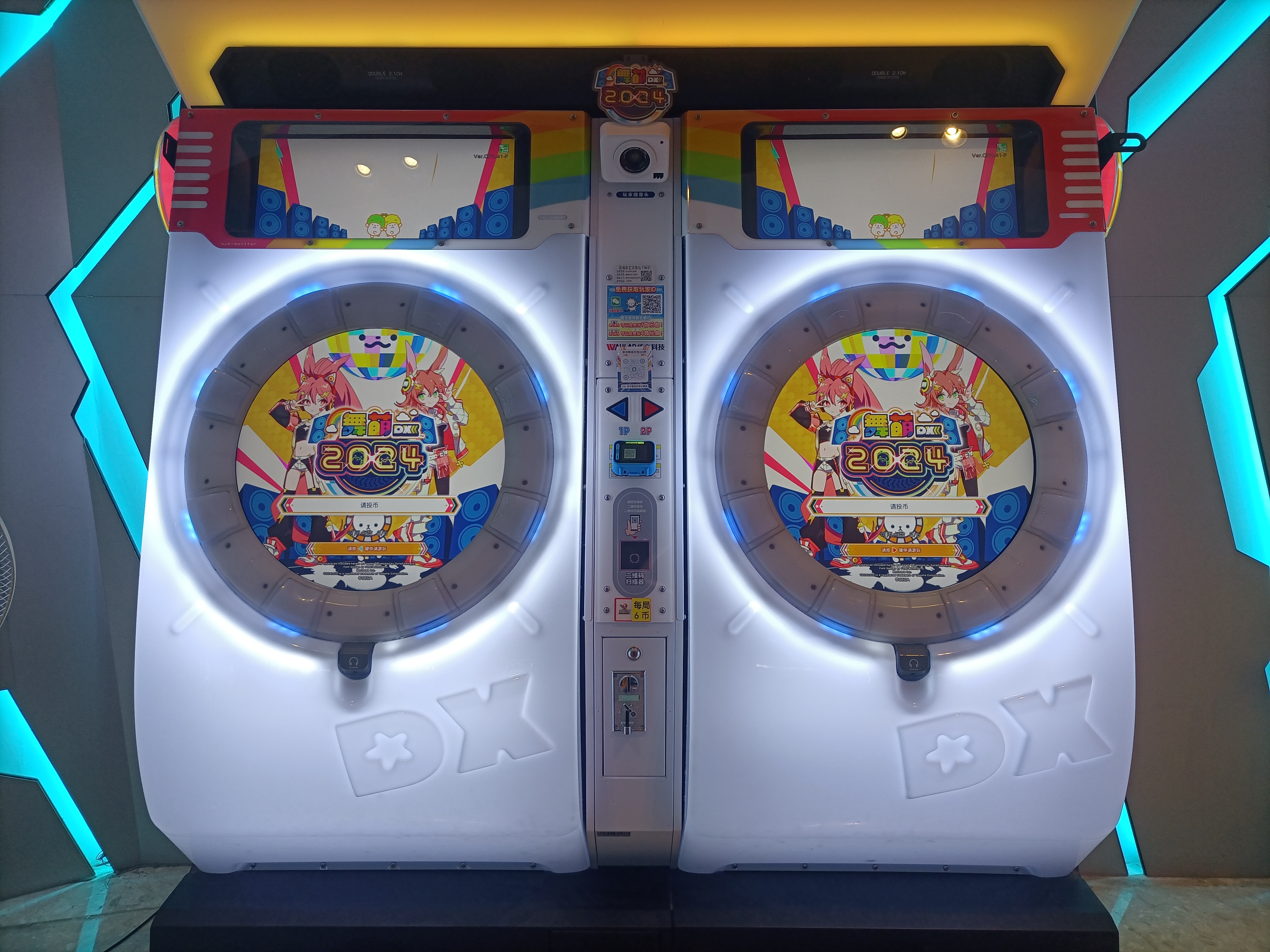
Maimai DX BUDDiES (known as 舞萌in Chinese) in Changzhou, China, 2024

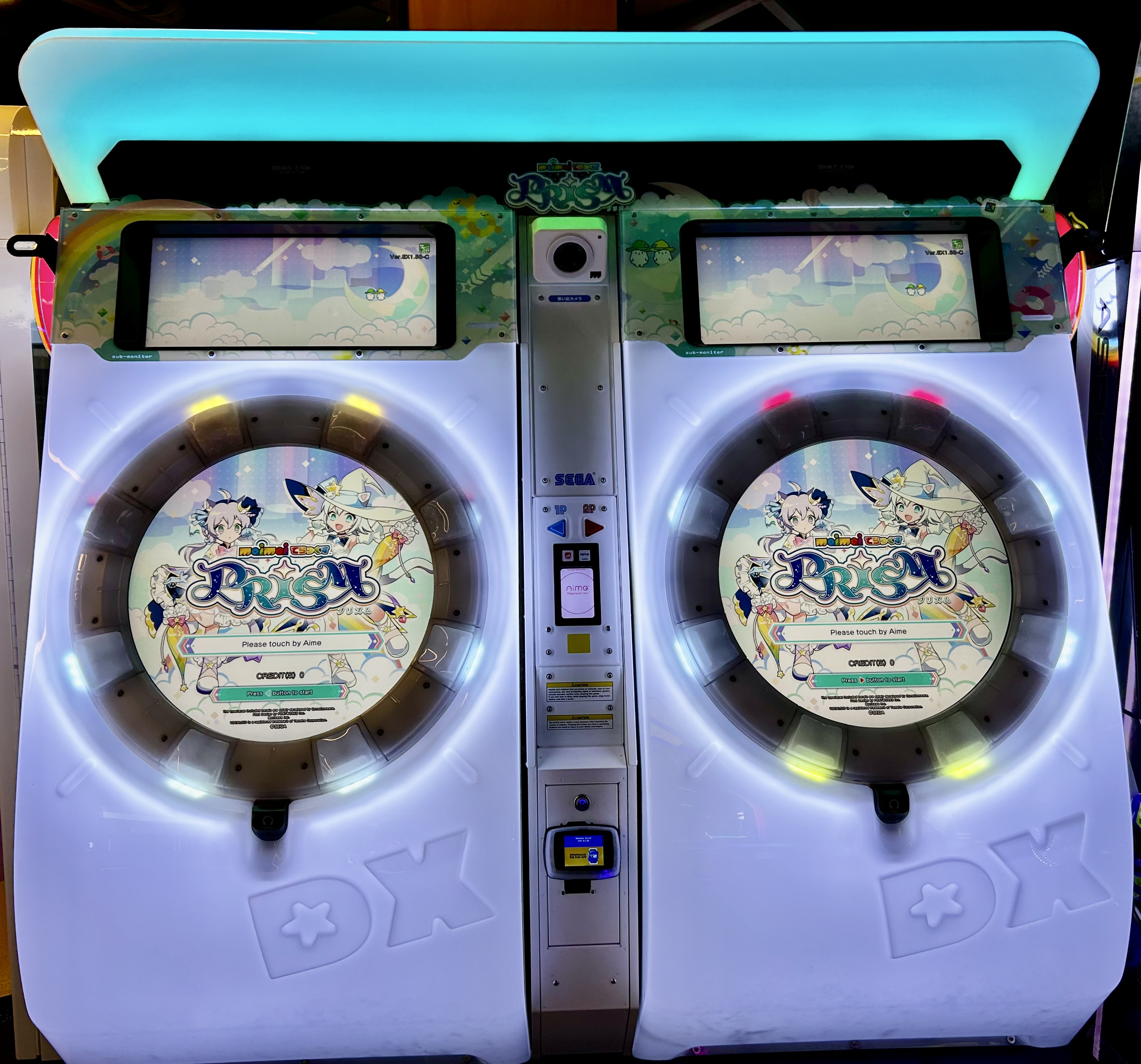
DX PRiSM cabinet in Perth, Australia, 2025

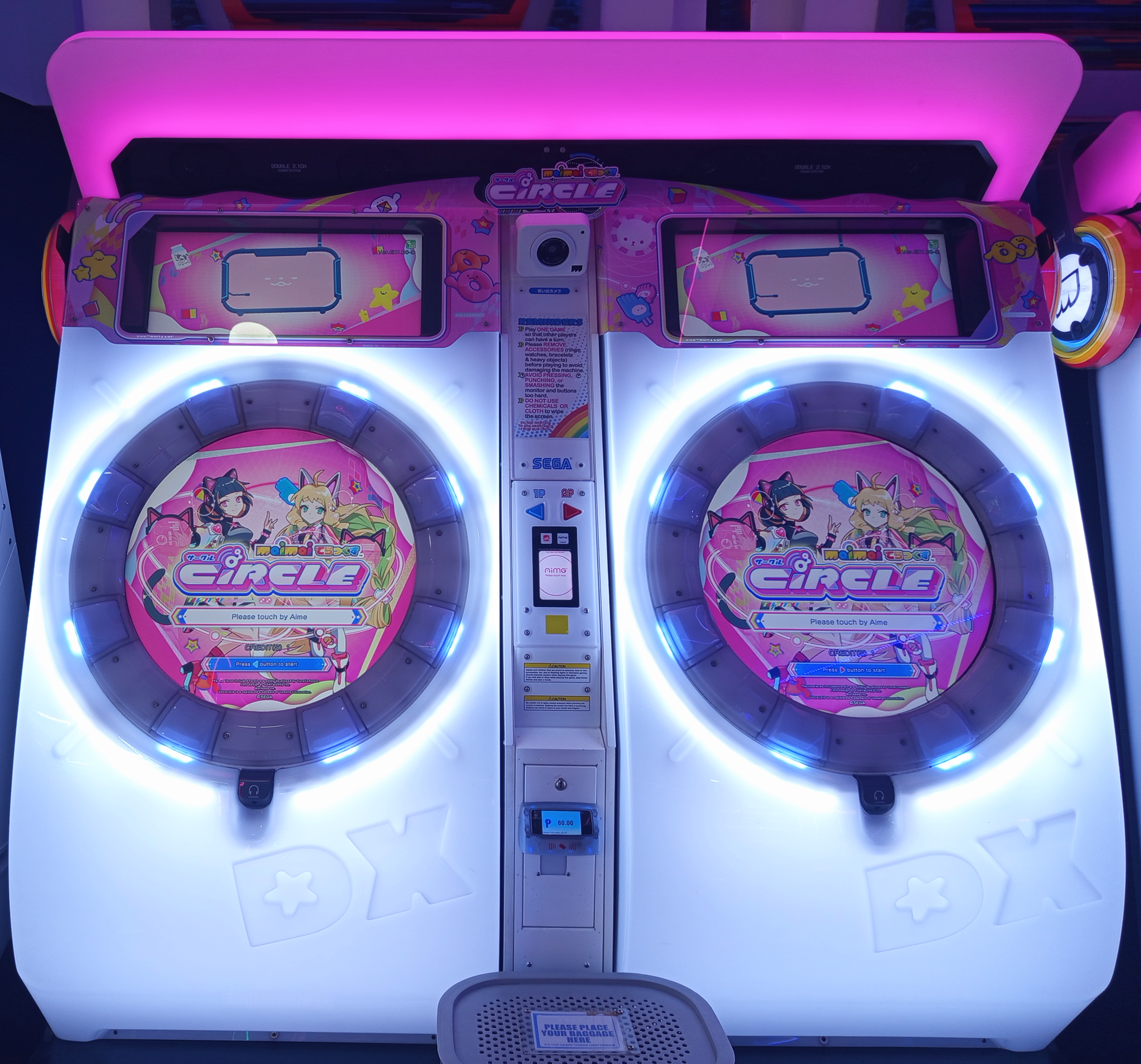
DX CiRCLE cabinet in Mandaluyong, Philippines, 2026
