= Arcade Building =

Arcade Building may refer to:

== Canada ==
- Arcade Building (Toronto), Ontario

== United States ==
(alphabetical by state)

- Arcade Building (Fort Pierce, Florida), listed on the National Register of Historic Places (NRHP)
- Arcade Building (Riverside, Illinois), NRHP-listed
- Arcade Building (Brookline, Massachusetts), NRHP-listed
- Arcade Building (St. Louis, Missouri), NRHP-listed in St. Louis
- Arcade Building (Asheville, North Carolina), or Grove Arcade, NRHP-listed
- Westminster Arcade, Providence, Rhode Island, NRHP-listed
- Arcade Building (Columbia, South Carolina), NRHP-listed

== See also ==
- Arcade Hotel (disambiguation)
