= Arcade Hotel =

Arcade Hotel may refer to:

- Arcade Hotel (Tarpon Springs, Florida), listed on the National Register of Historic Places (NRHP)
- Arcade Hotel (Springfield, Ohio), listed on the NRHP
- Arcade Hotel (Hartsville, South Carolina), listed on the NRHP
