= The Arcade (company) =

Australian nonprofit company

- Current logo as of September 2016.
- Type: Private nonprofit
- Industry: Workspace
- Founded: September 2013; 13 years ago
- Founder: Tony Reed
- Headquarters: Levels 1-2, 71-75 City Road, Southbank, Melbourne, Victoria 3006, Australia
- Number of locations: 1 (2016)
- Area served: Melbourne, Australia
- Key people: Tony Reed
- Services: Workspace; Independent video game development
- Owner: Interactive Games and Entertainment Association
- Website: thearcade.melbourne

The Arcade is an Australian nonprofit company that houses indie game developers in designated workspaces in order to foster a creative community "using game methodologies and technologies". They share property rent and are open to game testing each other's games to offer critique and support.

== History ==
The company was established in 2013 in Melbourne. Tony Reed, president of the Game Developer's Association of Australia, came up with the idea in 2010. After being declined two times by the Australian government, they were given a chance to test it successfully, after which they were given funding from Film Victoria, as well as seed money from the GDAA. Part of the rationale is due to politician Joe Hockey cancelling the Interactive Media Fund, thereby taking $10 million out of the Australian video game industry.

As of 2016, the company hosts 33 video game studios from a small amount the previous year. The company moved to a new premises in South Melbourne in early 2017.

In March 2020 IGEA merged with GDAA, acquiring all assets including The Arcade. Key Arcade members Ceri Hutton and Sav Emmett Wolfe continue to run The Arcade whilst also assuming new roles within IGEA.

== Culture ==
According to the Sydney Morning Herald, the company "offers discounted office space and hot desking, plus the significant benefits of shared knowledge and networking that come with working alongside others".

One of the devs explained: "I was working from home, going insane. I found out that this space was starting up...It's been incredible. If I've got a question from a tech perspective...I can just go and talk to some of Australia's foremost experts...That kind of expertise is just invaluable as a developer".

== Companies ==
It currently houses 33 Australian gaming development studios including:

- CG Spectrum
- Considerable Content
- DBolical
- Dime Studios
- Double Jump
- Fluffy Kitten Studios
- Game Developer's Association of Australia
- Goat Entertainment
- Grapple Gun Games
- Green Stripe Snake
- igda Melbourne
- Ironworks Games
- Log
- Lumi
- ManyMonkeys
- Mighty Games
- Minimega
- Mountains
- Points of Engagement
- Positomic
- Rocket Jump
- Samurai Punk
- Surprise Attack
- The Otherworld Agency
- The Voxel Agents
- Tin Man Games
- VectorStorm
- Wander
- Yak&Co
