= Arcade (architecture magazine) =

American architecture and design magazine

ARCADE is a quarterly magazine about architecture and design in the Northwestern United States. The magazine was established in 1981. It is published by the Northwest Architectural League. The mission of ARCADE is to provide dialogue about design and the built environment. The magazine is based in Seattle, Washington.

== See also ==
- List of architecture magazines
