= Arcade Club =

Chain of amusement arcades in UK

Arcade Club is a chain of amusement arcades located in the United Kingdom that originally opened in 2014. Its venues contain original arcade machines from five different decades of video gaming history.

== History ==
The first Arcade Club opened in Haslingden in 2014, after the successful trial of its "Free Play" model in the back of a computer shop during closing hours in an effort by the owner, Andy Palmer, to bring business to his chain of computer stores. The original location included 100 original arcade machines, with an emphasis on games from the Golden Age of Arcade Video Games. The venue would go on to be featured on the BBC's Collectaholics. The increased popularity of the venue forced a move in location to bigger premises, and Arcade Club moved to Ela Mill in Bury Greater Manchester, which included a venue that offered a variety of food and drinks. Containing over 400 original arcade machines/games, it is the biggest arcade in the continent of Europe.

In May 2019, the company opened a second location in Kirkstall Leeds, filled with original arcade games from across five different decades. In autumn 2019, it was announced that a third venue would be opening in Blackpool, once dubbed the mecca of arcade games.

While it is not the first arcade to operate using the Free Play model, wherein no coins are necessary to play the machines, it has popularised the model in the UK.

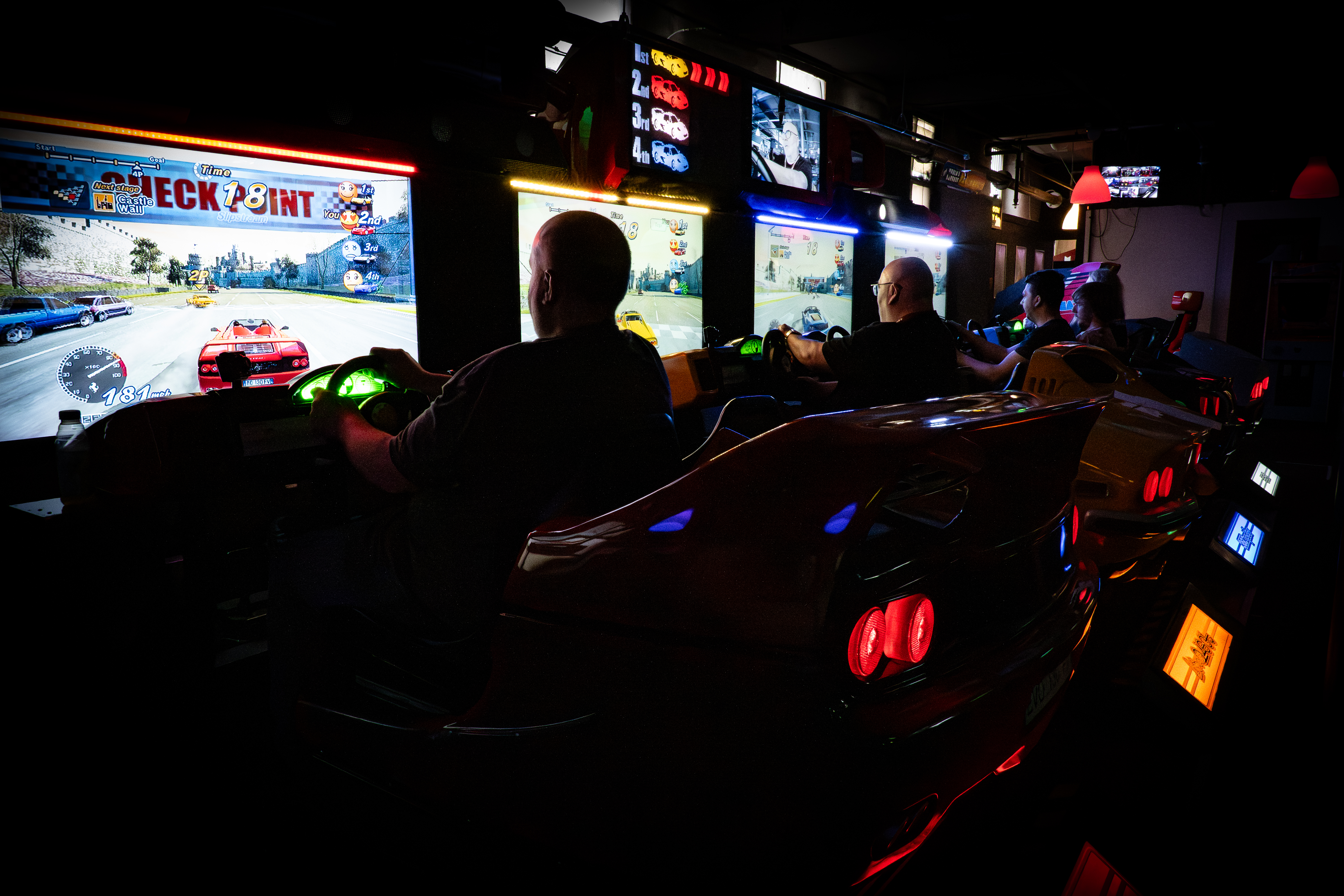
Players on an Outrun 2SP SDLX Machine

== In Pop Culture ==
=== Television ===
Arcade Club Bury served as a prominent location the Netflix series Fool Me Once (2024)
