= K-95 (Kansas highway) =

State highway in Kansas, U.S.

K-95
- Western Vistas Historic Byway
- K-95 highlighted in red

Route information
- Maintained by KDOT
- Length: 6.591 mi (10.607 km)
- Existed: July 27, 1966–present

Major junctions
- South end: US-83 north of Scott City
- North end: US-83 south of Elkader

Location
- Country: United States
- State: Kansas
- Counties: Scott

Highway system
- Kansas State Highway System; Interstate; US; State; Spurs
← K-94	→ K-96

K-95 is an approximately 6.6-mile-long (10.6 km) state highway in the U.S. state of Kansas. K-95's southern terminus is at U.S. Route 83 (US-83) north of Scott City, and the northern terminus is at US-83 south of Elkader. The highway forms a section of the Western Vistas Historic Byway. K-95 travels through mostly rural land, and is a two-lane highway its entire length.

Within Lake Scott State Park, just west of K-95, is the El Cuartelejo ruins. It is the remains of a structure thought to have been built by Taos Pueblo Indians who left New Mexico in 1664 to escape Spanish rule. The highway passes about 0.6 miles (970 m) east of the area of the Battle of Punished Woman's Fork, the last Indian battle in the state. The route that K-95 follows was planned to become a state highway in a resolution on July 27, 1966, to link US-83 to Lake Scott and Lake Scott State Park. This alignment was altered in a resolution on May 10, 1967, and was designated as K-95. K-95 first appeared on the 1969 State Highway Map, and its alignment has not changed since.

== Route description ==
K-95's southern terminus is at US-83 north of Scott City. The highway travels in a northwest direction through mostly flat prairie for 0.4 miles (640 m) before intersecting West Road 250. K-95 then passes through a rock cut, as it descends in elevation slightly into the Ladder Creek Valley. The roadway continues for 0.45 miles (720 m) then curves in a northeast direction and crosses Ladder Creek. The highway soon intersects a road that leads west to the Battle of Punished Woman's Fork monument, then passes through a rock cut made through Devils Backbone. K-95 continues for about 0.7 miles (1.1 km) through flat grassland, passing by White Womans Grave, before crossing Morgan Draw, which flows into Ladder Creek. The roadway continues for about 0.3 miles (480 m) then begins to run along Ladder Creek, which the road continues to follow for about 0.15 miles (240 m), before the creek curves to the east.

K-95 begins to curve in a northwest direction and soon crosses a creek that drains Epler Canyon, then Barrel Spring Trout Pond. The highway begins to head northeast as it intersects West Scott Lake Drive, which travels west then north to Lake Scott State Park. K-95 crosses Ladder Creek and continues in northeast direction through mostly open land with some scattered trees for about 0.5 miles (800 m) then enters an area with scattered houses before intersecting East Scott Lake Drive. The highway then turns to the east and passes through a rock cut for roughly 0.1 miles (160 m) then veers to the north. K-95 advances another roughly 0.75 miles (1.21 km) then curves east. The roadway continues through flat rural farmland for about 1.8 miles (2.9 km) before reaching its northern terminus at US-83 south of Elkader.

The entire length of K-95 is part of the Western Vistas Historic Byway, which runs from US-83 at Scott City to US-40 at Sharon Springs. The Kansas Department of Transportation (KDOT) tracks the traffic levels on its highways. Along K-95 in 2019, they determined that on average the traffic varied from 125 vehicles per day near the northern terminus to 600 vehicles per day near the southern terminus. K-95 is not included in the National Highway System. The National Highway System is a system of highways important to the nation's defense, economy, and mobility. K-95 does connect to the National Highway System at its southern and northern terminus, US-83. The entire route is a two-lane highway, and paved with partial design bituminous pavement.

== History ==
=== Early area history ===
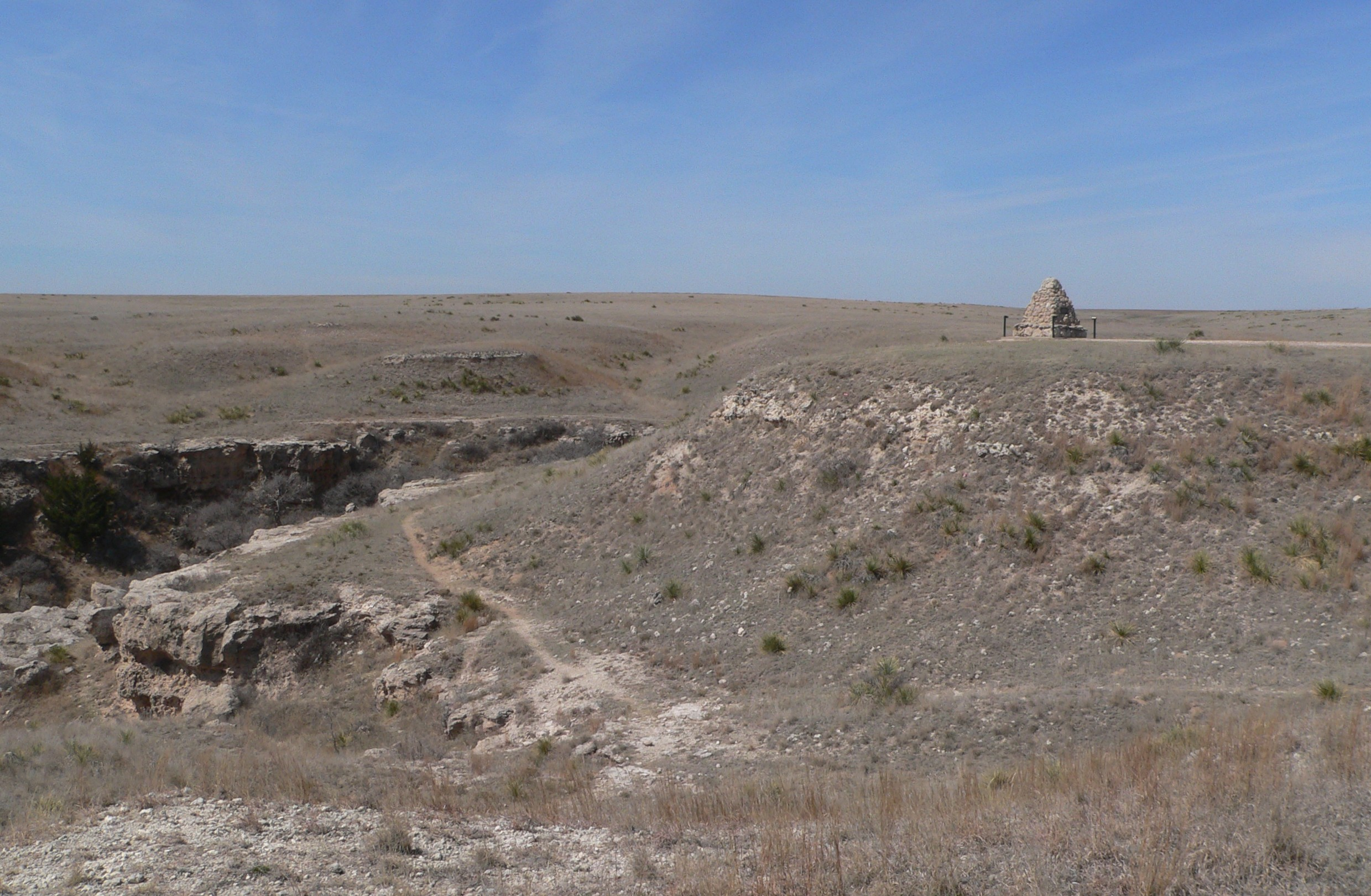
Battle Canyon, site of Battle of Punished Woman's Fork, located slightly west of K-95

Within Lake Scott State Park, just west of K-95, is the El Cuartelejo ruins. It is the remains of a structure thought to have been built by Taos Pueblo Indians who left New Mexico in 1664 to escape Spanish rule. The site became a National Historical Landmark in 1964. In 1970, the Kansas Historical Society studied the area and restored the landmark. K-95 passes about 0.6 miles (970 m) east of the area of the Battle of Punished Woman's Fork, the last Indian battle in the state.

=== Establishment and improvements ===
K-95 was first approved to become a state highway in a resolution on July 27, 1966, to link US-83 to Lake Scott and Lake Scott State Park. As planned in 1966, the highway curved northwest at East Scott Lake Drive, and continued for about one mile (1.6 km), then made a sharp curve toward the southeast. It continued for a short distance before curving east and meeting its modern alignment. This alignment was cancelled and was altered in a resolution on May 10, 1967, at which time a new alignment was approved, and became K-95. The highway first appeared on the 1969 State Highway Map, and its alignment has not changed since. In 2007, community leaders in Scott, Logan, and Wallace counties agreed to apply for a scenic byway designation from Scott City to Oakley to Sharon Springs. At this time it was suggested that it would be better to designate it a historic byway due to all the historic locations along the route. On July 22, 2010, the Western Vistas Historic Byway was established along K-95.

== Major intersections ==
The entire route is in Scott County.

Location	mi	km	Destinations	Notes
Michigan Township	0.000	0.000	US-83 – Oakley, Scott City	Southern terminus
Beaver Township	3.135	5.045	West Scott Lake Drive – Lake Scott State Park	
Michigan Township	6.591	10.607	US-83 – Oakley, Scott City	Northern terminus; continues east as Road 290 (unpaved)
1.000 mi = 1.609 km; 1.000 km = 0.621 mi
