= Juan Domingo de Bustamante =

42rd Spanish Governor of New Mexico
- In office 1723–1731
- Preceded by: Juan Estrada de Austria
- Succeeded by: Gervasio Cruzat y Góngora

Personal details
- Born: Puente San Miguel, Reocín, Cantabria, Spain
- Died: Unknown
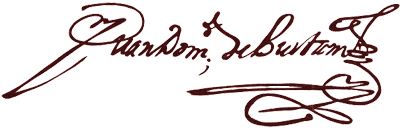
- Signature

Juan Domingo de Bustamante was the governor of Santa Fe de Nuevo Mexico from 1723 to 1731, as well as Lieutenant Captain of El Paso, a region that belonged to Santa Fe de Nuevo Mexico until the incorporation of New Mexico and Texas to the United States in the 19th century.

== Early years and family ==
Bustamante was the son of Antonio Pérez Bustamante and Josefa de Tagle Villegas. He had at least one brother: Francisco Antonio Pérez Bustamante, who was a lawyer at the Real Audiencia of Mexico City. Of noble origin, his father was a Knight of the Order of Santiago. Bustamante was the nephew and brother-in-law of Governor of New Mexico Antonio Valverde y Cosio. In 1722 Bustamante was part of the military garrison at the Presidio de El Paso de Río del Norte, in Santa Fe de Nuevo México, where he served as Lieutenant Captain.

== Administration of New Mexico ==
Bustamante was appointed governor of Santa Fe of Nuevo Mexico in 1723. Immediately after arriving at the governor's charge he began to exercise his policies, in addition to handling judicial cases. Thus, in 1723, Bustamante was the person in charge of studying the case of the alcalde mayor of Albuquerque, Martin Hurtado, who had developed a system of political corruption in his city. This system included nepotism and personal benefit from Albuquerque's funds, in addition to imposing an authoritarianism. However, although the number of civil cases Bustamante had to deal with remained more or less unchanged from the previous year, criminal cases decreased.

Under his administration, settlers and Native Americans in New Mexico were forced to keep their weapons (specifically their guns) and their horses, through a law that cancelled the sale of any such products.

In addition, Bustamante perceived a notable reduction in the number of soldiers available to the presidio of Santa Fe, from a little over 100 people in 1715 to only twenty two in 1723.

However, in November 1723, the number of soldiers in the presidio seems to have increased, as at that time Bustamante led a troop of fifty men (mostly stationed in the mentioned presidio) into the territory of the Jicarillas, an Apache tribe that lived near the Wichita River, in order to explore and colonize the region. However, the inhabitants of this region, which had already been christianized by the missionaries, submitted peacefully and voluntarily to the governor. This made the Comanches fear that both peoples (the Spaniards and the Jicarillas) would attack them, instead of just one of them. Thus, these peoples would force them to carry out two military campaigns. To avoid this, the Comanches decided to attack and destroy the mentioned Apache region at the beginning of 1724. The comanches took the Jicarilla territory for five days. After this, the Comanches took with them an undetermined number of women and children as prisoners, while the Jicarillas were forced to accept such a capture. So, according to different authors, the Apaches took with them all the women and children of the Jicarilla territory or only half of them. After this, the Comanches set fire a series of villages in the Jicarillas's territory, which caused the death of many of its inhabitants, except for seventy-four people (mostly adult men, but also some women and children). Thus, a war between the Comanche-Jicarilla peoples broke out in the El Gran Sierra de Fierro, located in the modern-day Texas panhandle. After the war, which lasted nine days, some of the Jicarilla bands fled from their villages to other parts of Texas and New Mexico, while others settled in the Navajo territory of Colorado, who also were Christianized and were loyal to the Spanish governor, to take refuge from the Comanches.

After knowing that, Bustamante sent a troop of 100 people to Comanche territory. The troop was led by Juan Paez Hurtado and found to sixty-four people who had been abducted by that people; some of them were jicarillas. However, the troop did not find the Comanches. Although the group was released, the troop did not go to the Jicarilla territory. This was because the officials in Mexico City, capital of New Spain, were undecided whether to subject the Jicarilla territory to Spanish rule, which was key to helping the Jicarillas against the Comanches. Later, however, Bustamante established a peace agreement with both the Comanches and the Jicarillas.

In the same year (1724), Bustamante ordered that Spanish residents in New Mexico should guard the territory and warn authorities if they saw French merchants moving about the province, as he had heard rumors about the French were selling their products in Taos, which was dangerous to Spanish acclaim in the region. This was because the French wanted to occupy areas in New Mexico and Texas and to do so they had to first establish good relations with the local population, and only then establish a "permanent base" there. It should not be forgotten that France could not civilly colonise most of the North American regions it coveted (except for specific areas such as New Orleans or Montreal), as it did not have enough people who wanted to move to those places (or North America in general), nor a population to populate them. In addition, trade with foreigners in Spanish America was illegal. Thus, Bustamante ordered that any merchant found in the province be sent to Santa Fe, where he would be interrogated. He took a document to the Viceroy of New Spain about possible trade between the French and the residents of New Mexico.

In 1727 Bustamante requested the Viceroy of New Spain to send several troops to New Mexico in order to investigate a group of Frenchmen who, according to him, had been in El Cuartelejo, located in modern-day Kansas, and Chinali, a region near Santa Fe, and whose place of settlement was unknown at that time. The Spanish troops had to search for the French because they might still be in New Mexico.

Bustamante governed New Mexico until 1731, when he was replaced by Gervasio Cruzat y Góngora.
