= Cruzat =

Cruzat is a surname. Notable people with the surname include:

- Fausto Cruzat y Góngora (died 1702), Spanish Governor-General of the Philippines
- Francisco Cruzat, Spanish soldier in New Spain
- Gervasio Cruzat y Góngora, Spanish Governor of New Mexico in New Spain
- Gwendolyn S. Cruzat (born c. 1930), American librarian and professor
- Ignacio Cruzat (1913–1977), Chilean sports shooter
- José Antonio Guzmán Cruzat (born 1967), Chilean lawyer and academic
- Ricardo Cruzat (1845–1905), Chilean lawyer and politician
