= Jean L'Archevêque =

French explorer, soldier and merchant-trader (1672–1720)

- Born: September 30, 1672; Bayonne, Kingdom of France
- Died: August 20, 1720 (aged 47) near present day Columbus, Nebraska
- Citizenship: France (1672-1692); Spain (1692-1720)
- Known for: Explorer

Jean L'Archevêque (September 30, 1672 – August 20, 1720) was a French explorer, soldier and merchant-trader. One of the few survivors of the ill-fated French colony Fort Saint Louis (Texas), L'Archevêque, the son of a merchant-trader from Bayonne, France, indentured himself to merchant-trader Sieur Pierre Duhaut in order to participate in the expedition to find the colony. L'Archevêque is known to have been the decoy that led René-Robert Cavelier, Sieur de La Salle into an ambush in which Duhaut shot La Salle. While Duhaut was killed by expedition members to avenge La Salle's murder, L'Archevêque escaped the same fate because he was viewed more favorably and was thought to be less guilty. L'Archevêque was killed in 1720 near what is now Columbus, Nebraska by Native Americans of the Pawnee tribe during the Villasur expedition.

== Fort Saint Louis ==
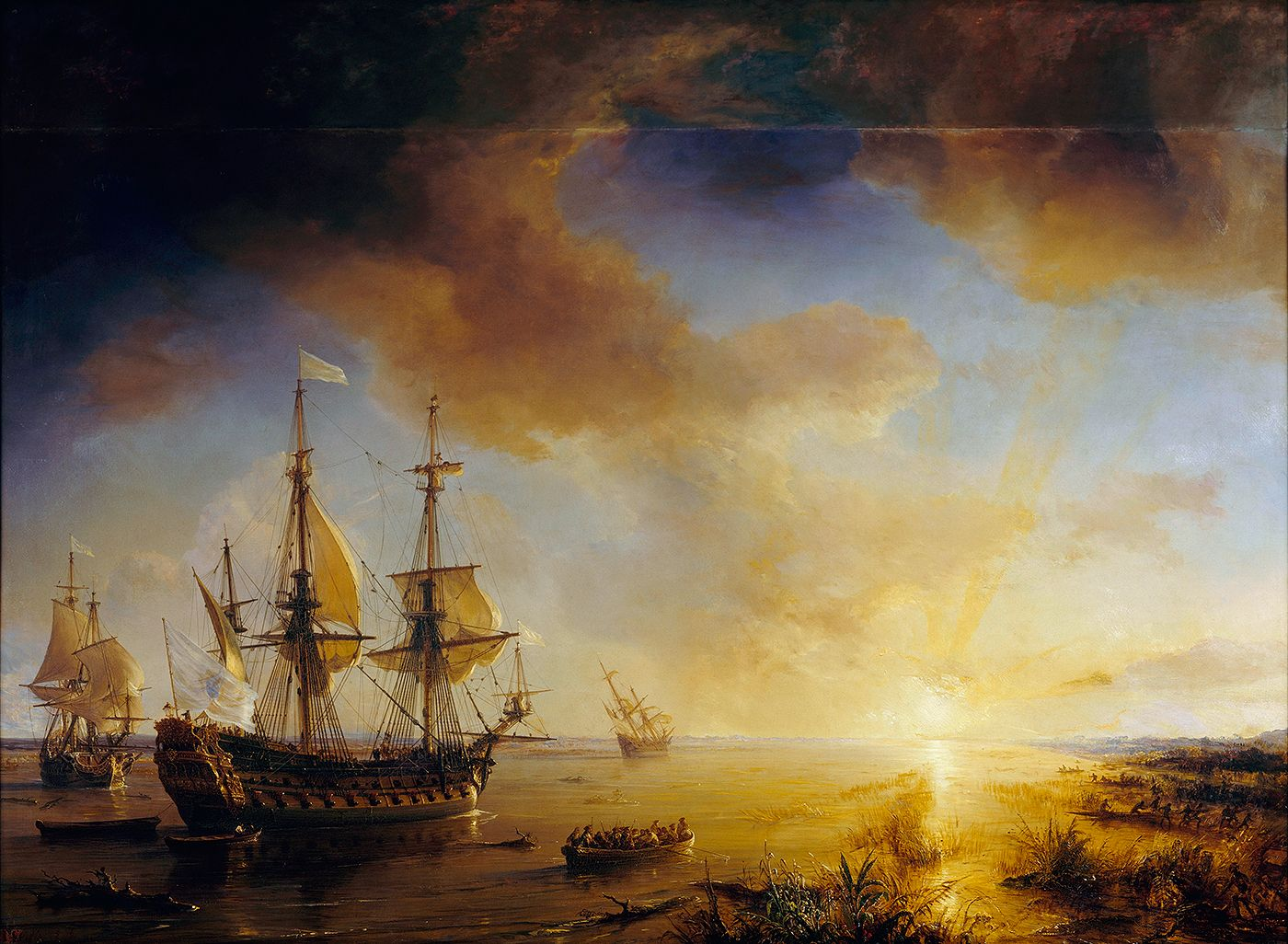
La Salle's Expedition to Louisiana in 1684, painted in 1844 by Jean Antoine Théodore de Gudin. La Belle is on the left, Le Joly is in the middle, and L'Aimable is grounded on the right.

L'Archevêque was born to Claude and Marie (d'Armagnac) L'Archevêque on September 30, 1672 in Bayonne, France. The L'Archevêque family was Catholic while in Bayonne, but the family had been bourgeois Huguenots (French Protestant Calvinists) in Bordeaux prior to the conversion of Pierre L'Archevêque, Jean L'Archevêque's paternal grandfather. The family relocated to Bayonne in the 1650s.

In 1684, aged twelve, L'Archevêque joined the expedition of René-Robert Cavelier, Sieur de La Salle. Two years previously, La Salle had led the first expedition down the Mississippi River from New France to the Gulf of Mexico, claiming the entire Mississippi River watershed for France as the new territory of Louisiana. La Salle returned to France and proposed establishing a French colony at the mouth of the Mississippi, between Spanish Florida and New Spain. The colony would provide a base for promoting Christianity among the native peoples as well as a convenient location for attacking the Spanish province of Nueva Vizcaya and gaining control of its lucrative silver mines.

On July 24, 1684, the expedition left La Rochelle for the New World with 300 people aboard 4 ships. The members included 100 soldiers, 6 missionaries, 8 merchants, over a dozen women and children, and artisans and craftsmen. Fifty-eight days later, the expedition stopped at Santo Domingo (Saint-Domingue), where one of the ships, the St-François, which had been fully loaded with supplies, provisions, and tools for the colony, was captured by Spanish privateers. L'Archevêque joined the expedition with Pierre and Dominique Duhaut when La Salle stopped at Petit-Goâve, the French West Indies outpost, to acquire provisions, which were purchased with credit extended by the brothers Duhaut. The Duhauts were then given trading privileges and allowed space for merchandise on La Salle's ships that would have ordinarily been reserved for supplies for the colony. L'Archevêque had come to Petit-Goâve with his merchant-trader parents, and claimed kinship with the Duhaut brothers.

In late November 1684, the three remaining ships continued their search for the Mississippi River delta. A combination of inaccurate maps, La Salle's previous miscalculation of the latitude of the mouth of the Mississippi River, and overcorrecting for the currents led the ships to be unable to find the Mississippi. Instead, they landed at Matagorda Bay in early 1685, 400 miles (644 km) west of the Mississippi.

On February 20, the colonists finally reached shore, their first feel of land in the three months since leaving Santo Domingo. They set up a temporary camp near the location of the present-day Matagorda Island Lighthouse. While trying to navigate the shallow pass into the bay, one of the ships, L'Aimable, was grounded on a sandbar. For several days the men attempted to salvage the tools and provisions that had been loaded on the Aimable, but a bad storm prevented them from recovering more than food, cannons, powder, and a small amount of the merchandise. By March 7, the ship had sunk.

The following week, the ship Le Joly, which had been loaned to La Salle by the Louis XIV, returned to France, leaving the colonists with only one ship, La Belle. Many of the colonists chose to return to France aboard Le Joly, leaving approximately 180 behind. La Salle searched for a more permanent settlement site and found Garcitas Creek, which had fresh water and fish, with good soil and timber along its banks, and named it Rivière aux Boeufs for the nearby buffalo herds. Fort Saint Louis would be constructed on a bluff overlooking the creek, 1.5 leagues from its mouth. The men found a source of salt nearby and constructed a community oven.

In early June, La Salle summoned the rest of the colonists to the new settlement site. Seventy people began the 50-mile (80 km) overland trek on June 12. All of the supplies had to be hauled from the Belle, a physically draining task that was finally completed by the middle of July. Although trees grew near the site, timber suitable for building was found several miles inland, and the trees were transported back to the new building site. Some timbers were even salvaged from the Aimable. By the end of July, over half of the settlers had died, most from a combination of scant rations and overwork.

With their permanent camp established, the colonists took several short trips within the next few months to further explore their surroundings. At the end of October La Salle decided to undertake a longer expedition from January until March 1686, La Salle and most of his men searched overland for the Mississippi River, traveling towards the Rio Grande, possibly as far west as modern-day Langtry. It is unknown whether L'Archevêque accompanied La Salle or remained behind.

While La Salle was gone, La Belle was wrecked in a storm. The destruction of their last ship left the settlers stranded on the Texas coast, with no hope of gaining assistance from the French colonies in the Caribbean.

By early January 1687, fewer than 45 people remained in the colony. La Salle believed that their only hope of survival lay in trekking overland to request assistance from New France, and sometime that month he led a final expedition to attempt to reach Illinois. Fewer than 20 people remained at Fort Saint Louis. Seventeen men were included on the expedition, including La Salle, his brother, two of his nephews, and L'Archevêque. While camping near present-day Navasota on March 18, several of the men quarreled over the division of buffalo meat. That night, one of La Salle's nephews and two other men were killed in their sleep by another expedition member. The following day, La Salle was shot by Pierre Duhaut while speaking to L'Archevêque as he was approaching the camp to investigate his nephew's disappearance. Infighting led to the deaths of two other expedition members, including Pierre Duhaut, within a short time, and L'Archevêque was targeted but was spared at the insistence of the Recollect friar Father Anastasius Douay. Two of the surviving members, including L'Archevêque, did return to La Salle's camp and remained for two months, but later joined the Caddo after missing a rendezvous with members of La Salle's expedition that were heading to French Illinois Country. The remaining six men made their way to Illinois Country as quickly as possible and met several of Henri de Tonti's men near the Arkansas River. During their journey through Illinois to Canada, the men did not tell anyone that La Salle was dead. They reached France in summer 1688 and informed King Louis of La Salle's death and the horrible conditions in the colony. Louis did not send aid.

== Rescue ==
L'Archevêque quickly tired of his life with the Caddo. In 1689, he and his companion, Jacques Grollet, wrote a note asking for rescue. They gave the note to the Caddo, who passed it on to the Jumano Indians while trading. The Jumano were allied with the Spanish and brought a packet of documents to Spanish authorities in New Mexico. The documents included a parchment painting of the Joly, as well as a written message from L'Archeveque. The message read: "I do not know what sort of people you are. We are French[;] we are among the savages[;] we would like much to be Among the Christians such as we are[.] ... we are solely grieved to be among beasts like these who believe neither in God nor in anything. Gentlemen, if you are willing to take us away, you have only to send a message. ... We will deliver ourselves up to you."

Alonso De León rescued L'Archeveque and Grollet. On interrogation, the men maintained that over 100 of the French settlers had died of smallpox, and the others had been killed by the Karankawa. The only people known to have survived the final attack were the Talon children, who had been adopted by the Karankawa. According to the children, the Indians had attacked around Christmas in 1688, killing the remaining settlers.

== Spanish citizen ==
L'Archevêque and Grollet were taken first to Mexico City. In the summer of 1689, they sailed with Captain Andrés de Pez as prisoners to Spain, and arrived in Madrid in January 1690. Five months later, they petitioned for a stipend of two Spanish reals per day, which was granted, then they were forgotten in prison for almost two years.

In May 1692, L'Archevêque and Grollet petitioned to be released, arguing that they had committed no crimes against Spain. The Junta De Guerra de Indias war council reviewed the petition, but could not recommend they be set free outright because their knowledge of Spanish territory could have weakened Spain's position against France. However, the war council also could not recommend keeping then isolated in royal jail while at peace with France because Louis XIV would have had grounds for their repatriation.

After swearing an oath to Spain, the war council allowed the men to return to Spanish territory controlled by the Viceroy of New Spain Gaspar de la Cerda Sandoval Silva y Mendoza, 8th conde de Gelves, where they would be out of reach of the French, and granted them an additional stipend and a soldier's rations for the voyage. They departed from Cádiz to Veracruz with Admiral Andrés de Pez in 1692.

L'Archevêque became a soldier then joined a group of colonists led by Diego de Vargas and arrived in Santa Fe on June 22, 1694. In 1697 he married a widow, Antonia Gutiérrez, who bore him two children, Miguel and Maria.

It is likely that Antonia died in 1701. That year, L'Archevêque purchased an estate in Santa Fe, but continued to serve as a soldier. He served as a scout in 1704 under Juan de Ulibarri. In 1706, L'Archevêque, as part of a militia which included a smattering of French, Flemish, and other European exiles, accompanied a Spanish expedition headed by Juan de Ulibarrí, who suspected that knowledge of the French language would be useful, to the El Cuartelejo village of western Kansas. In 1714 he became a member of a junta. After retiring from the military, L'Archevêque became a merchant. His sons, Miguel, and illegitimate son Agustin, assisted him with his business.

In 1719 he became a father again, as a servant girl gave birth to his illegitimate son. Later that year, on August 16, he married Manuela Roybal, the daughter of alcalde Ignacio de Roybal, which was attended by the Spanish governor of New Mexico, Antonio Valverde y Cosío. The year following his marriage, L'Archevêque joined the Villasur expedition to investigate suspected French influence among the Pawnee in the present state of Nebraska. The Pawnee force was believed by the Spanish to be assisted by a Frenchman, so L'Archevêque was to assist in interpreting contacts with the French. The Pawnee, probably without any French participation, attacked suddenly on August 20, 1720, and killed most of the Spanish, including L'Archevêque. The battle took place near present-day Columbus, Nebraska.

By the time of L'Archevêque's death he had become known as Captain Juan de Archibeque. He was credited with honorable military service. His trading operations extended as far as Sonora with occasional business in Mexico City, and his notes of credit were accepted and endorsed by those connected to the government. He is the progenitor of the Archibeque family of New Mexico.

== In fiction ==
The life of Jean L'Archevêque is recounted in Mike Blakely's novel Comanche Dawn.
