= Juan de Ulibarrí =

- Born: 1670; San Luis Potosi, Mexico
- Died: 1716 (aged 45–46); Mexico City
- Occupations: Explorer and soldier

Juan de Ulibarrí or Uribarrí (1670-1716) was a Spanish or Criollo soldier and explorer who lived in New Mexico. In 1706 he led an expedition to El Cuartelejo on the Great Plains of western Kansas and eastern Colorado. Ulibarrí's diary survives and is an important source for the history of Spanish exploration of the Great Plains and relationships with the Apache and Pueblo Indians. The purpose of Ulibarrí's expedition was to find and escort back to New Mexico about 60 people from Picuris Pueblo who had earlier fled Spanish rule in New Mexico and established communities on the Great Plains. The Cuartelejo Ruins in Kansas are a remnant of the Pueblos who lived on the plains.

== Early life ==
According to genealogical research, Ulibarrí (also known as Juan de los Reyes) was born in San Luis Potosi, Mexico and baptized there on March 8, 1670. His parents were Jose Enriquez de los Reyes and Maria Hernandez Ynojos. He had a brother named Antonio and both came to New Mexico with Diego de Vargas in 1692 in the reconquest of the province after the Pueblo Revolt of 1680. Ulibarri married, first, Francisca Mezquia (1676-1714) and, second, Juana Hurtado de Salas (1687-1750), possibly one-half Zuni Indian. He died in October 1716 in Mexico City. By some accounts Juana Hurtado was his first wife, born in 1664, and his son by Hurtado, Juan de Santa Ana Ulibarrí (1690-1756), was an adopted Apache Indian.

In New Mexico, Ulibarrí participated in expeditions to suppress the Navajo as witnessed by his carved name on the cliffs at El Morro dated 1701 and 1709.

== Foundation of Albuquerque ==
In February 1706, New Mexican governor Francisco Cuervo y Valdés ordered Ulibarrí to explore a site in the "great forest of Doña Luisa" to determine its suitability for settlement. Ulibarrí reported that the forest (bosque) was an excellent place for a new town and the governor authorized colonists to settle there, naming the new town Alburquerque, now Albuquerque.

== Background ==
El Cuartelejo ("the far quarter") was a region rather than a place, located north of the Arkansas River in present-day eastern Colorado and western Kansas. El Cuartelejo was inhabited by semi-nomadic Apache Indians, known to archaeologists as the Dismal River culture. In the 17th century, Pueblo frequently fled from their towns in the Rio Grande valley of New Mexico to El Cuartelejo to escape from Spanish rule and take refuge among the Apache. The first flight of the Pueblo to El Cuartelejo may have been in 1640 after Taos Indians killed their mission priest, Fray Pedro de Miranda. The Spanish sent out expeditions to try to force the Pueblos to come back to New Mexico.

In 1696, Governor Diego de Vargas and Ulibarrí, who had the title of Sergeant Major, subdued the rebellious people of Taos and Picuris pueblos. Some of the Picuris people fled to El Cuartelejo. In 1706, Spanish authorities in New Mexico received a message from the several dozen Picuris and other Pueblo people in El Cuartelejo claiming mistreatment by the Apache and asking to come back to New Mexico and requesting a military escort for their safe return. A new factor affecting the Great Plains was the arrival of the Comanche, aggressive, nomadic newcomers who made travel more dangerous. The governor appointed Ulibarrí to head the rescue expedition.

Ulibarrí may not have been the first Spaniard to visit El Cuartelejo but the records of his expedition survive unlike those of possible earlier visitors.

== Expedition ==
Ulibarrí left Santa Fe on July 13, 1706 leading a military force of 28 soldiers, 12 militiamen, and about 100 Pueblo Indians. The commander of the Pueblo Indians was Jose Naranjo, born in 1662, the grandson of an African slave and an Indian woman—and possibly a relative by marriage of Ulibarrí. With Ulibarrí also was Jean L'Archevêque (Juan de Archebeque), a Frenchman and a survivor of the Texas colony of La Salle. The presence of francophone L'Archeveque indicates that the Spaniards may have anticipated meeting Frenchmen on the plains. Encroachment by France on lands claimed by Spain was a deep-seated fear of the Spanish in New Mexico.

Ulibarrí's route led him, first, to Taos where he paused for several days because an attack on the town by Utes and Comanches was feared. He left Taos on July 20 and headed east, crossing the Sangre de Cristo Mountains and dropping down into the upper courses of the Canadian and Cimarron rivers. Along those two rivers, Ulibarrí encountered several friendly Apache bands, probably Jicarilla. Ulibarrí's account said that the Apache welcomed his visit and that he distributed gifts to them. Many of these Apache had adopted agriculture and were growing crops of maize, beans, and pumpkins.

On July 26, Ulibarrí turned north and crossed the Mesa de Maya into southeastern Colorado and found his way to Two Butte Creek and followed the creek down to its junction with the Arkansas River near Holly, Colorado. Crossing the Arkansas, Naranjo, who was apparently familiar with this region, warned Ulibarrí that the way ahead was waterless and a featureless plain. The expedition attempted to follow piles of grass made by the Apache as landmarks but became lost, finally encountering a spring and a settlement of El Cuartelejo on August 3. The Apache there had erected a cross on a hillside as a sign of welcome to the Spaniards. Ulibarrí, following Spanish custom, held a religious ceremony and claimed all the lands of El Cuartelejo for Spain.

Ulibarrí ransomed five Pueblo Indians from the Apache by giving them a dozen horses and sent detachments to two other El Cuartelejo settlements, one of them 40 leagues (more than 100 miles away) to gather others who wished to return to New Mexico. The exact location of the settlements is unknown, although one of them may have been the El Cuartelejo settlement known today in Scott County, Kansas. Among other things the Apache and Pueblos told Ulibarrí was that they had been in contact with the French on the eastern border of the Great Plains and had recently killed a Frenchman and his wife. They gave the French rifle to Ulibarrí as proof of that statement.

After gathering about 60 Pueblo Indians, Ulibarrí and the expedition returned to New Mexico, apparently following a similar route, returned the Indians to Picuris Pueblo, and arrived in Santa Fe on September 2.

== Aftermath ==
Ulibarrí's expedition and other actions by the Spaniards established better relationships with most of the Apache on the Great Plains and the Pueblos in New Mexico than had previously been true. Part of the reason for this was the new threat of Comanche and Ute raids on both Spanish and Indian settlements. The Ulibarrí expedition also contributed to Spanish fears of French encroachment on the Great Plains which led to the ill-fated Villasur expedition a few years later in which two of Ulibarrí's colleagues, Jose Naranjo and Juan d'Archebeque, would die.

Although accounts differ, Ulibarrí apparently journeyed to Mexico City a few years after his expedition and died there in 1716, possibly on October 28.
