= José Naranjo =

José Naranjo may refer to:

- José Naranjo (scout) (1662–1720), Pueblo Indian scout for the Kingdom of Spain
- José Naranjo (footballer, born 1926) (1926–2012), Mexican footballer
- José Naranjo (footballer, born 1994), Spanish footballer

== See also ==
- José Luis Naranjo y Quintana (born 1944), Mexican politician
