= Juan Ignacio Flores Mogollon =

Spanish military officer

36th Spanish Governor of New Mexico
- In office October 5, 1712 – October 5, 1715
- Preceded by: Jose Chacón Medina Salazar y Villaseñor
- Succeeded by: Felix Martínez de Torrelaguna

Personal details
- Born: 17th century
- Profession: Military and administrator (Governor of New Mexico)
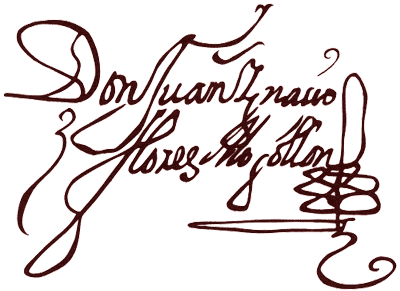
- Signature

Juan Ignacio Flores Mogollon was a Spanish military officer who served as governor of Santa Fe de Nuevo Mexico between 1712 and 1715, replacing Jose Chacón Medina Salazar y Villaseñor.

== Life and career ==
Mogollon joined the Spanish Army in his youth, where he excelled, attaining the title of Official.

Mogollon was appointed governor of New Mexico by Philip V of Spain and, having reached Santa Fe, occupied the office on October 5, 1712. During the first year he administered the territory, a Suma people revolt broke out against the government of New Mexico in El Paso. Thus, Mogollon had to suppress the revolt with a troop. His position as governor lasted a few years, because it was discovered that he had been involved in an embezzlement of funds, so he was removed from office on October 5, 1715, being replaced by Felix Martínez de Torrelaguna. Shortly after that, Mogollon left New Mexico. The trial was finally held in Santa Fe, New Mexico in 1721, when Mogollon no longer lived there. Thus, he was neither found nor presented for trial.

== Legacy ==
- The Mogollon Mountains, in southwestern New Mexico, were named after Flores Mogollon, Also Mogollon Town and the Pueblo Amerindians who lived in this place until early 1400s were named after Flores Mogollon.
