= Ladder Creek =

Stream in Colorado and Kansas, U.S.

Ladder Creek Beaver Creek, Chalk Creek
- Location of mouth within Kansas Ladder Creek (the United States)

Location
- Country: United States
- States: Colorado, Kansas

Physical characteristics
- Source
  - location: Firstview, Colorado
  - coordinates: 38°48′45″N 102°32′37″W
  - elevation: 4,565 ft (1,391 m)
- Mouth: Smoky Hill River
  - location: Elkader, Kansas
  - coordinates: 38°47′57″N 100°51′36″W
  - elevation: 2,631 ft (802 m)
- Length: 230 mi (370 km)
- Basin size: 1,407 sq mi (3,640 km^{2})

Basin features
- Watersheds: Ladder-Smoky Hill-Kansas-Missouri-Mississippi

Ladder Creek is a 230-mile-long (370 km) stream in the central Great Plains of North America. A tributary of the Smoky Hill River, it flows from eastern Colorado into western Kansas.

== Name ==
Ladder Creek, also known locally as Beaver Creek, was named by a surveying party "who found a ladder imbedded in the grass by the creek, almost hidden. When they tried to pull it out, it broke to pieces. It was a great mystery what use a ladder could be to any one out there. The rounds or steps had been tied to the sides with rawhide. There were notches around the steps and also around the side poles. This was such an important find that the surveying crew called the stream Ladder Creek."

== Geography ==
Ladder Creek rises in the High Plains region of the Great Plains and generally flows east. Its source lies just south of Firstview, Colorado in central Cheyenne County in the far eastern part of the state. The river flows east into western Kansas, turning southeast in southern Wallace County and then east again in north-central Wichita County. Finally, in Scott County, it turns north, joining the Smoky Hill River at Elkader, Kansas in southwestern Logan County.

In north-central Scott County, Ladder Creek has been dammed to form a small reservoir, Lake Scott.

== History ==
In 1664, a group of Taos people fleeing Spanish rule built a small pueblo on the west bank of Ladder Creek in what is today north-central Scott County, Kansas. The site was occupied intermittently until it was finally abandoned in 1727. University of Kansas archaeologists excavated the site in the 1890s, and it became known as El Cuartelejo, the northernmost pueblo ruins in the United States. In 1928, the Government of Kansas acquired El Cuartelejo and the surrounding land to create a state park. The following year, it dammed Ladder Creek a few miles north of the ruins to create Lake Scott, and the park became known as Lake Scott State Park.

In September 1878, the U.S. Army fought the Northern Cheyenne in the Battle of Punished Woman's Fork on bluffs overlooking the creek a few miles south of El Cuartelejo. In 1878, a group of Northern Cheyenne led by Chief Dull Knife and Chief Little Wolf, escaped their reservation at Fort Reno and went northward through Kansas toward their former home. The group of Cheyenne consisted of 92 warriors, 120 women, and 141 children. Lieutenant-Colonel William H. Lewis, who was the commander at Fort Dodge, was dispatched to locate and return them. On September 27, 1878, Lewis and his troops located them. The women, children, and elderly took cover in Squaw’s Den Cave, as the warriors fought the U.S. soldiers, at which time Lewis was shot in his thigh. Later that night, the Cheyenne escaped in a northwest direction. Lewis died of his wounds the next day, becoming the last Kansas military casualty of the American Indian Wars.

== See also ==
- List of rivers of Colorado
- List of rivers of Kansas
