= Ahora noticias =

2013 Chilean TV news programme

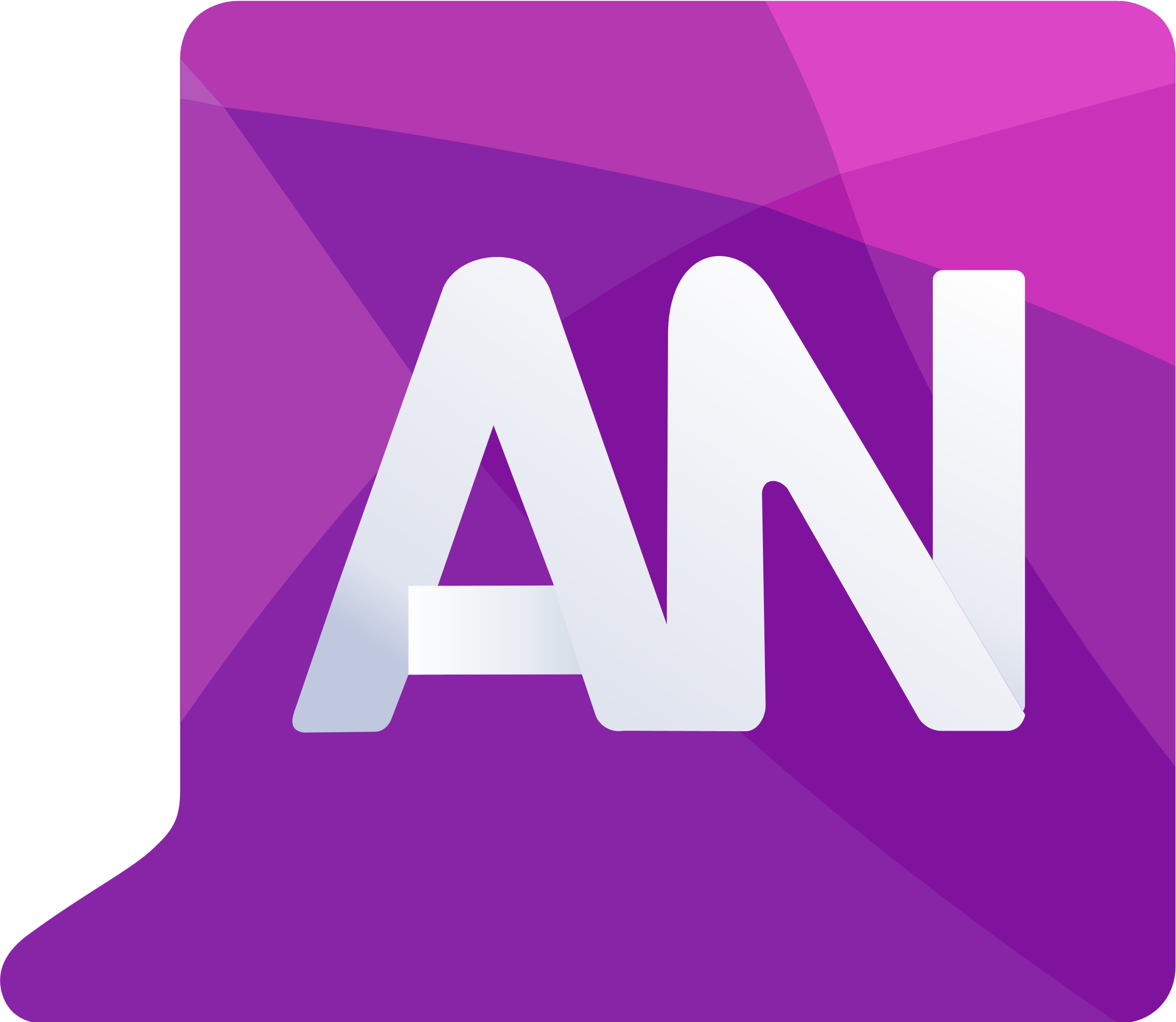
- Genre: News
- Presented by: Soledad Onetto; Catalina Edwards; Jose Luis Repenning; Maritxu Sangroniz; Priscilla Vargas
- Country of origin: Chile
- Original language: Spanish

Production
- Running time: 60-90 minutes

Original release
- Network: Mega
- Release: 25 August 2013 – 22 July 2019

Ahora Noticias (abbreviated AN) was the flagship evening news programme for the Chilean television channel Mega. It was broadcast from 25 August 2013 until 22 July 2019 being replaced by Meganoticias.
