= José Luis Uriarte =

Chilean politician (born 1977)

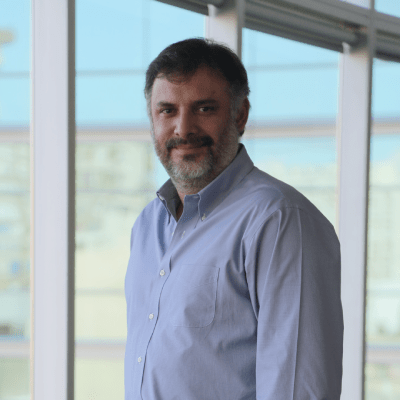

Undersecretary of Tourism
- In office 20 June 2020 – 11 March 2022
- President: Sebastián Piñera
- Preceded by: Mónica Zalaquett
- Succeeded by: Verónica Kunze

Personal details
- Born: 23 November 1977 (age 48) Santiago, Chile
- Party: Independent Democratic Union
- Education: University of the Andes, Chile; University for Development (MA)
- Occupation: Politician
- Profession: Lawyer

José Luis Uriarte Campos (born 23 November 1977) is a Chilean lawyer and politician, member of the Independent Democratic Union (UDI). From June 2020 to March 2022, he served as Undersecretary of Tourism of Chile under the second administration of President Sebastián Piñera.

== Early life and education ==
He graduated as a lawyer from University of the Andes (UANDES) and later obtained a master's degree in Public Policy from Universidad del Desarrollo (UDD).

== Professional and political career ==
In the 2005 parliamentary elections, he ran as deputy representing the 28th district of the Metropolitan Region, which included Lo Espejo, San Miguel, and Pedro Aguirre Cerda, but was not elected.

From May 2010 to March 2014, he served as general manager of Sercotec, from where he promoted a recovery plan for small and medium-sized companies after the 2010 Chile earthquake.

In 2014, he became the Secretary General of the National Chamber of Commerce, while between 2018 and 2019 he served in the Ministry of Public Works (MOP) as territorial head and advisor to Minister Juan Andrés Fontaine. He was also an advisor to the Minister of Economy, Lucas Palacios.

On June 12, 2020, he was appointed as the Undersecretary of Tourism by Sebastián Piñera, following the departure of Mónica Zalaquett.
