= University of the Andes, Chile =

University in Chile

Coordinates: 33.4046°S 70.5072°W

Universidad de los Andes, Chile
- Universidad de los Andes, Chile
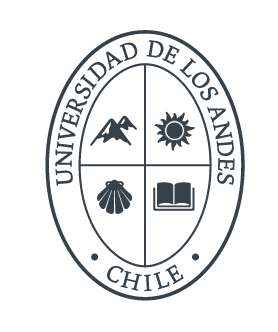
- Motto: Universitas Studiorum Andinensis
- Type: Private
- Established: 1989; 37 years ago
- Chancellor: José Antonio Guzmán Cruzat
- Faculty: 1,300+ (2022)
- Students: 11,000+ (2022)
- Undergraduates: 8,900+ (2022)
- Postgraduates: 2,100+ (2022)
- Location: Avenida Monseñor Álvaro del Portillo 12455, Las Condes, Santiago, Chile, Chile
- Campus: 52 ha (128 acres) Santiago
- Website: http://www.uandes.cl/ (in Spanish)

Universidad de los Andes (Spanish: Universidad de los Andes) (UANDES) is a private catholic-inspired higher learning institution that carries out non-profit education, research, and assistance activities, and was founded in 1989 in Santiago de Chile by a group of academics and professionals.

UANDES is currently accredited by the National Accreditation Commission for a period of 5 years out of a maximum of 7 in five areas: pre- and postgraduate teaching, research, community engagement, and institutional management. Since 2019 it is a member of the Council of Chancellors.

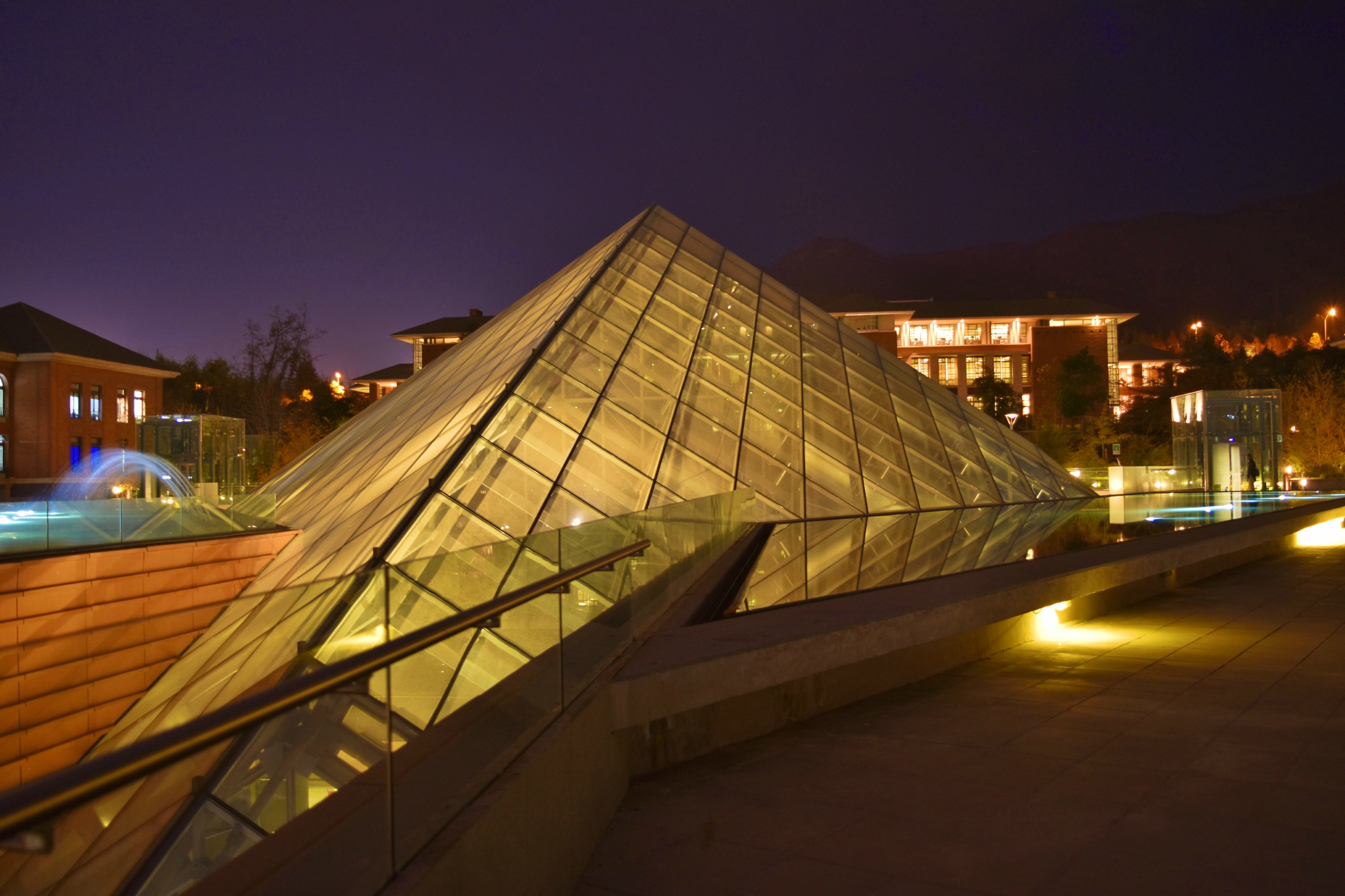
Main building of the University.

== History ==
The university was founded on September 8, 1989, by Eduardo Fernández León, Matías Izquierdo Menéndez, and Eduardo Gulisasti Gana, and others.

The faculty of law was the first to begin, in 1990, followed by the medical faculty and the institute of philosophy. Over the years, new majors were added on today reaching a total of 22 undergraduate majors, 10 associate degree programs, 1,700 academics, 4 doctorates, 8 postgraduate programs, 21 master's programs, 25 advanced-study programs and 27 specialties in the health field.

== Students ==
Its 9,000 students are currently studying one of the 28 undergraduate majors it offers in the fields of humanities, engineering, and healthcare, and 11 associate degree programs. Its postgraduate programs, which include PhD, master, and medical specialty programs, have over 1,500 students enrolled. Located on its sole campus are the Clinica Universidad de los Andes, the CiiB (Center for Research and Biomedical Innovation) and the ESE Business School. The Universidad de los Andes Health Center 1, located in the district of San Bernardo in southern Santiago, was also created as a service to the local community as well as a hands-on teaching facility.

== Infrastructure ==
On the San Carlos de Apoquindo Campus, the university has nine buildings, including the ESE Business School, the engineering building, a library, and the central building which houses the offices of most of the support units, classrooms, a degree room, and academic staff offices. It also has two clinical halls of its own, one of them is a health center located in San Bernardo and Clinica Universidad de los Andes, which is integrated onto the university campus.

== Chancellors ==
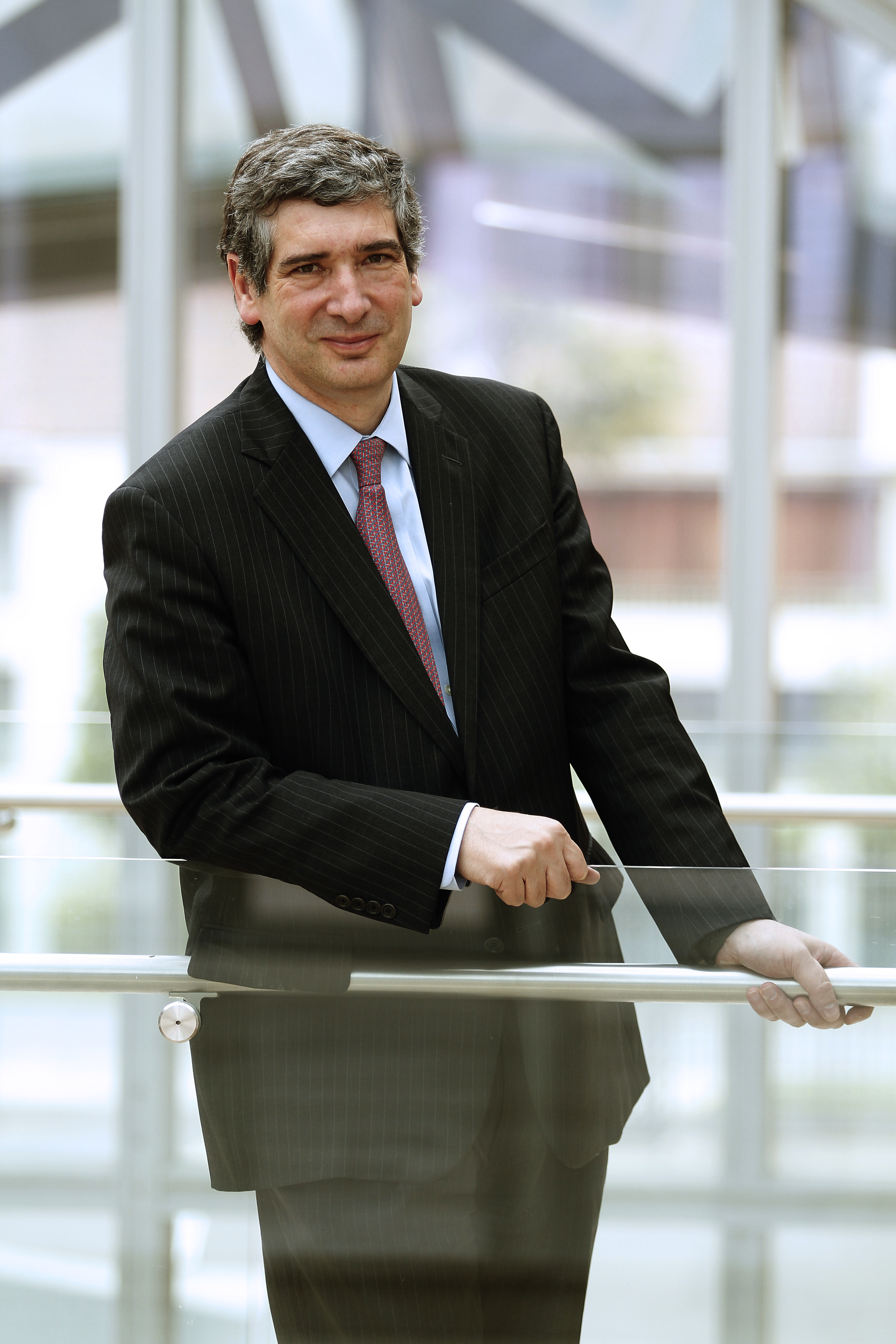
Chancellor of the University of Los Andes, José Antonio Guzmán Cruzat.

- 1989-1998: Raúl Bertelsen Repetto
- 1999-2003: Oscar Cristi Marfil
- 2004-2013: Orlando Poblete Iturrate
- 2014-To date: José Antonio Guzmán Cruzat

== Academic programs and schools ==
Universidad de los Andes offers 29 undergraduate degrees leading to professional degrees. It also dictates 11 associate degree programs, which can be continued here or at other higher learning institutions.

=== Health department ===
Universidad de los Andes was the first private Chilean university not belonging to the Council of Chancellors to teach medicine.

- Medicine
- Dentistry
- Nutrition and dietetics
- Nursing
- Psychology
- Physical therapy
- Occupational therapy
- Speech therapy
- Obstetrics and childcare

=== Engineering and administration department ===
- Service administration
- Business administration
- Environmental civil engineering
- Civil engineering in public works
- Industrial civil engineering
- Electrical civil engineering
- Civil engineering in computer science

=== Humanities department ===
- Law
- Journalism
- Philosophy
- Literature
- History
- Advertising
- Media and communications

=== Education department ===
- Early childhood education
- Elementary education
- Bilingual elementary education
- High school education
- High school education in Roman Catholic theology
- In 2018 enrollments were closed and with it the majors for high school history, literature, and philosophy.

=== Associate degree programs ===
- Associate degree in medicine
- Associate degree in dentistry
- Associate degree in psychology
- Associate degree in service administration
- Associate degree in nursing
- Associate degree in engineering
- Associate degree in business administration
- Associate degree in civil engineering
- Associate degree in humanities
- Associate degree in law
- Associate degree in health care
- Associate degree in obstetrics and childcare

=== Faculties and academic units ===
Currently, the university has nine faculties, eleven schools and three other independently governed academic units:

- School of service administration
  - Service administration
- School of psychology
  - Psychology
- Faculty of economics and business
  - Business administration
- Faculty of communications
  - Media and communications
  - Journalism
  - Advertising
- Faculty of law
  - Law
- Faculty of education
  - Early childhood education
  - Elementary education
  - High school education
  - Bilingual elementary education
  - High school education in Roman Catholic theology
- Faculty of nursing and midwifery
  - School of nursing
  - School of obstetrics and childcare
- Faculty of philosophy and humanities
  - Institute of history
  - Institute of philosophy
  - Institute of literature
- Faculty of engineering and applied sciences
  - Environmental civil engineering
  - Civil engineering in public works
  - Industrial civil engineering
  - Electrical civil engineering
  - Civil engineering in computer science
- Faculty of medicine
  - School of speech therapy
  - School of physical therapy
  - School of medicine
  - School of nutrition and dietetics
  - School of occupational therapy
- Faculty of dentistry
  - Dentistry
- Institute of family sciences
- Associate degree programs
  - Associate degree in service administration
  - Associate degree in law
  - Associate degree in nursing
  - Associate degree in humanities
  - Associate degree in engineering
  - Associate degree in business administration
  - Associate degree in healthcare
  - Associate degree in medicine
  - Associate degree in dentistry
  - Associate degree in obstetrics and childcare
  - Associate degree in psychology
- Center for general studies

== International agreements ==
The university has a significant number of international agreements with universities around the world and houses different research centers and institutes.

== Notable alumni ==
List of students of Universidad de los Andes (Chile)

=== Politics ===
- Joaquín Lavín León
- Lucia Pinto

=== Journalism ===
- Manuel de Tezanos-Pinto
- María Luisa Godoy
- Catalina Edwards

=== Film ===
- Guillermo Amoedo
- Lorenza Izzo

=== Law ===
- Carlos Charme
- Jorge Alessandri Vergara
- Felipe Ward
- Felipe Alessandri
- José Luis Uriarte
- Enrique Guzmán Blanco
- Alejandro Rubilar Camurri

== Student participation ==
In 2012, the first election for a student federation was held, resulting in the election of the "construye" (build) list led by civil engineering student Nicolás Peñafiel. Since November 24, 2025, the student federation has been represented by Cristóbal Rodríguez

Some past student federation presidents have been:

- 2020: Ignacio Cruz (MED), University Renewal Movement.
- 2019: Florencia Barañao (NUR), Create Uandes Movement.
- 2018: Valentina Guerrero (LAW), Forward Uandes Movement.
- 2017: Álvaro Arriagada (BA), Create Uandes Movement.
- 2016: Vicente Chomon (LAW), Forward Uandes Movement.
- 2015: Patricio Werner (MED), student council chosen by the presidents of the various student councils.
- 2014: Constanza Astorga (NUR), Build Uandes Movement.
- 2013: María Teresa Urrutia (LAW), Build Uandes Movement.
- 2012: Nicolás Peñafiel (ENG), Build Uandes Movement.
