= Félix Martínez de Torrelaguna =

Spanish colonial governor

37th Spanish Governor of New Mexico (Acting)
- In office 1715–1716
- Preceded by: Juan Ignacio Flores Mogollón
- Succeeded by: Antonio Valverde y Cosío

Personal details
- Born: Alicante, Spain

Félix Martínez de Torrelaguna was acting Governor of New Mexico from 1715 to 1716.

== Biography ==
Torrelaguna was born in Alicante in Valencia, Spain. He became a senior officer under Diego de Vargas, who recruited by him in 1693 at Zacatecas. He fought well during the reconquest of New Mexico after the Pueblo Revolt of 1680, serving as adjutant to Vargas, then as commander of El Paso del Norte, and from 1703 captain of the Santa Fe presidio. On June 3, 1715 Felix Martinez assumed command of the Santa Fe Presidial Company from Antonio Valverde y Cosío.

The Viceroy appointed Felix Martinez to succeed Juan Ignacio Flores Mogollon as governor of New Mexico, and he took office in Santa Fe on December 1, 1715. In 1716, he conducted an expedition to the west into the Moquis region in an effort to reduce the Hopi towns to subjection to the Spanish. In early 1717, he left office due to legal problem over presidio supply. In 1726, he returned to New Mexico to defend himself, after which he returned to Mexico City for good.

== Sources ==
- Archuleta, Roy A. (2006). Where We Come From. Where We Come From, collect. ISBN 978-1-4243-0472-1.
- Prince, Le Baron Bradford (1883). Historical sketches of New Mexico: from the earliest records to the American occupation. Leggat brothers. p. 225.
- Twitchell, Ralph Emerson (1914). The Spanish Archives of New Mexico. Sunstone Press. ISBN 978-0-86534-684-0.
- Vargas, Diego De; Kessell, John L. (1989). Remote Beyond Compare: Letters of Don Diego De Vargas to His Family from New Spain and New Mexico, 1675-1706. UNM Press. ISBN 978-0-8263-1112-2.
