= Catalina Edwards =

Chilean journalist

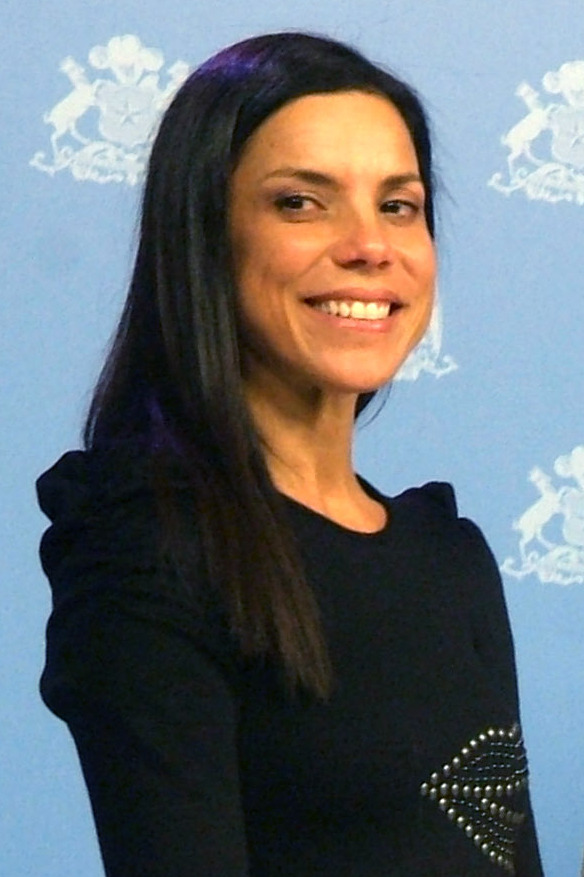
- Born: October 26, 1976 (age 49); Viña del Mar, Chile
- Other name: "Cata" Edwards
- Occupation: Journalist

Catalina Edwards (born October 26, 1976, in Viña del Mar) is a Chilean journalist. She is currently a news anchor on Ahora Noticias and a panelist on Mucho Gusto, both television shows on the Mega channel.

== Biography ==
She is the daughter of Juan Miguel Edwards Ross and María Verónica Delpino Allú. She is the older of four siblings, and the only daughter.

She studied at Villa Maria Academy, a Catholic school for girls in Santiago, Chile. She studied journalism at the University of the Andes.

She worked for seven years at Canal 13.

In 2007, she was the radio host of Vitamina on Radio Horizonte alongside Sergia Paz and Mauricio Contreras.

== Personal life ==
She is married to Juan Pablo Tisné and has one son. She revealed in a magazine that at age 30 she was diagnosed with premature menopause.
