= Antonio Valverde y Cosío =

38th Spanish Governor of New Mexico (Acting)
- In office 1716–1716
- Preceded by: Félix Martínez
- Succeeded by: Juan Páez Hurtado

40th Spanish Governor of New Mexico (Interim)
- In office 1718–1721
- Preceded by: Juan Páez Hurtado
- Succeeded by: Juan Estrada de Austria

Personal details
- Born: 1670 Villapresente, Cantabria, Spain
- Died: February 1737 (aged 66–67) El Paso, Texas
- Profession: Political and military

Antonio Valverde y Cosío (1670–February 1737) was the architect behind the disastrous Villasur expedition wherein the famous Spanish colonial scout José Naranjo perished.

He was a prominent entrepreneur and Spanish soldier who served as acting governor of Santa Fe de Nuevo México in 1716 and as interim governor of this territory from 1718 to 1721. His politics were based, in large part, on stopping the French invasion of New Mexico.

== Biography ==
=== Early life ===
Antonio Valverde y Cosío was born around 1670 in Villapresente, Cantabria, Spain. He was attracted to New Spain by various business interests that his family had in the region. He began working in Sombrerete (in modern Mexico) because minerals had been discovered there in 1646. Over time, he and his associates created an important business in the area. The success of their partnership grew over the next 24 years. In 1693, Diego de Vargas, governor of New Mexico, recruited settlers and soldiers from Sombrerete, and Valverde decided to join them. Eventually, he became Vargas' secretary.

From June 1694 to July 1697, Valverde served as a soldier in New Mexico, fighting to impose Spanish authority in New Mexico and restore the region's Hispanic population. Over the next two years (1694–96), he and Vargas participated in the war against the Puebloan peoples, who had rebelled against Spanish sovereignty because of the maladministration of Juan Francisco Treviño. In December 1695, Valverde was promoted to captain of the local presidio.

He participated in many battles in 1696, including an assault on the mesa at Acoma. In early June, he began a military campaign against the Tewa people, who had promoted a Native American revolt along with the Tiwa, Keres, and Jemez people. That same year, Valverde suffered a serious illness, and Vargas gave him permission to travel for treatment in Mexico City.

In July 1697, Pedro Rodríguez Cubero replaced Vargas as governor and presented complaints against Vargas and Valverde. Vargas was imprisoned for several years, but Valverde was unaffected because he was in Spain at the time.

Valverde and Juan Bautista de Saldúa shared the captaincy of the presidio of El Paso, a position Valverde held for the remainder of his life. In 1699, he was appointed alcalde of El Paso.

He had an estate, including a large farm, in San Antonio de Padua. In addition, he controlled much of the economy of El Paso, along with trade and business in many other parts of New Mexico. In 1705, he became a lieutenant general under Governor Francisco Cuervo y Valdés. In 1708, he was named a councilman of Santa Fe. Two years later, in 1710, he got the rank of general. In 1712 and 1714, he fought against the Suma Indians and Apaches, who had rebelled against the Spanish. In 1715, Valverde was interim governor of New Mexico.

=== Governorship ===
Valverde was appointed acting governor of New Mexico in 1716, replacing Félix Martínez. Later, he was replaced in the same year by Juan Paez Hurtado, but regained the position in 1718.

The viceroy Baltasar de Zúñiga entrusted Valverde with the foundation of a mission in the Jicarilla land, in the modern Cimarron, Kansas, to evangelize this band, as well as a presidio in the Apache settlement of El Cuartelejo (located also in present-day western Kansas). However, Valverde temporarily dismissed this proposal and decided organize a military expedition to search for the Comanches, who were attacking Spanish and Pueblo settlements in New Mexico, to capture them. His force consisted of 60 Spanish soldiers, 45 Spanish settlers, and, as auxiliaries, 465 Pueblo and 165 Apache Amerindians. However, the troop did not succeed in capturing that people.

In September 1719 Valverde led a troop to Jicarilla and El Cuartelejo. The troop was make up of 100 Spanish soldiers and some 500 Amerindian Pueblos. When Valverde and his troops arrived to the Arkansas River in Eastern Colorado, one of the Apaches of El Cuartelejo told him that the French had established five settlements in two villages on Pawnee lands west of the Missouri River, "as big as Taos" in New Mexico. He also said that the French were arming the Native Americans to fight the Spanish. He did not encounter any Comanche or Utes during the expedition. On his return to Santa Fe, he sent a report to the viceroy explaining that the French were preparing to enter New Mexico and that they were bribing the native tribes with gifts, including firearms.

On January 10, 1720, Viceroy Zúñiga ordered Valverde to establish a fortification in El Cuartelejo in order to prevent French expansion in the area. However, Valverde suggested to the viceroy that the Jicarilla land, just 40 miles from Santa Fe and with cultivated fields, would be a better choice. He noted that the Apaches of El Cuartelejo, allies of the Spanish, were much more distant from Santa Fe and had no supplies, so they could not adequately defend themselves from enemy attacks; Valverde argued that the Spanish should help defend them. Thus, in June 1720, Valverde directed the Villasur expedition to check the growing French influence in the Great Plains and capture French traders there. The expedition of 100 men, including many Pueblo Amerindians, traveled to the confluence of the Loup River and North Platte River in what is now Nebraska. In New Mexico, several hundred of Amerindians, particularly of the Pawnee and Otoe tribes, attacked with firearms, killing many of the explorers.

Valverde finished his term in New Mexico in 1721, when the viceroy of New Spain appointed Juan Estrada de Austria as the new governor of the province.

=== Last years ===
Valverde was accused of facilitating the murder of explorers through the Villasur expedition. He was eventually prosecuted and fined 200 pesos, but the prosecution took place only after seven years of investigation. In the interim, Valverde had again become a rancher in El Paso. He lived there until his death in 1737. He was buried in the mission at Guadalupe del Paso.

== Personal life ==
Valverde married Maria de Esparza, he had several children: Antonia and Juana. He was also the uncle of Juan Domingo Bustamante, who would become governor of Spanish New Mexico. He was one of the wealthiest men in New Mexico, with a hacienda that included large wheat fields, a flour mill, a vineyard, and a farm with sheep, cattle, horses, mules, hogs, and goats. He also had nine black and mulatto slaves and more than 30 farm laborers.
