= José Naranjo (scout) =

Pueblo scout for the Spanish government of New Mexico

- Born: c. 1662
- Died: 14 August 1720; Near modern-day Columbus, Nebraska
- Spouse: Catalina
- Children: At least seven
- Military career
- Allegiance: Kingdom of Spain
- Service years: 1692–1720
- Conflicts: Apache campaign El Cuartelejo expedition Villasur expedition

José Naranjo (c. 1662 – 14 August 1720) was a Puebloan of partial African ancestry who served the Spanish government of New Mexico. His father may have helped lead the Pueblo Revolt of 1680 and Naranjo initially opposed co-operation with the Spanish, successfully escaping from Spanish custody.

After 7 October 1692, Naranjo appears to have come to terms with the Spanish, working for the governor of New Mexico Diego de Vargas. Shortly afterwards Naranjo killed his brother Lucas, who was leading an Indian rebellion, and sent his head to Vargas. Naranjo was appointed an alcalde and leader of Indian auxiliary troops, serving on expeditions against the Apache and the Pueblo who had fled to El Cuartelejo. In 1720 he was appointed chief scout and leader of auxiliary troops on the Villasur expedition, despite having opposed it. He was killed on 14 August 1720 when the expedition was attacked by Pawnee and Otoe forces.

== Early life ==
Naranjo was a Pueblo Indian born circa 1662 to Domingo Naranjo (whom Angelico Chavez believed instigated the Pueblo Revolt of 1680). The grandson of a black freedman and an Indian woman, he was nicknamed el Mulato or el negro. Chavez believed Naranjo's mother to have been a mestizo from Analco as José was lighter skinned than his father. Shortly after the revolt José was captured by men working for the Spanish governor Antonio de Otermin but refused to betray his tribe and Otermin ordered him brought to Guadalupe del Paso. José escaped on 8 January and found refuge with the Northern Pueblo Indians – perhaps joining his father at Taos.

== In Spanish service ==
José Naranjo was discovered at Taos by the army of Diego de Vargas on 7 October 1692. It is at this point that Naranjo seems to have switched allegiance to the Spanish cause. He seems to have accompanied Vargas on his campaign to reoccupy New Mexico, witnessing a number of skirmishes and battles before settling at Santa Cruz.

On 13 June 1696 he learnt that his brother Lucas was leading an insurrection against the Spanish. Naranjo informed the Spanish authorities, tracked down and killed his brother before presenting his head to Vargas. In 1700 he was rewarded for his actions by appointment as alcalde of the Zuni and leader of their auxiliary troops, which fought for the Spanish. In this role he successfully escorted Spanish missionaries sent to the Hopi tribe, and defended them from attack.

Naranjo helped facilitate the surrender of Santa Clara Pueblo by bringing Indian leaders to negotiate with the Spanish at Santa Fe and also negotiated the surrender of the Tano tribe. He returned to Taos and was able to persuade the Indians there to build a church and host a Spanish priest (as had been attempted several decades earlier).

Naranjo accompanied Vargas on his Apache campaign as leader of Indian scouts, and was present when Vargas was killed at Bernalillo in 1704. Naranjo had learnt the Apache language through a relationship with an Apache woman and acted as an interpreter between the Spanish and the Apache. In 1707 he joined Juan de Ulibarrí's expedition to capture Pueblo Indians who had fled to El Cuartelejo (in modern Kansas). Ulibarrí named a watering hole used by the expedition after Naranjo.

By 1707 Naranjo was said to be married to a woman named Catalina and had seven children. Naranjo was appointed chief of all Pueblo auxiliary troops by Fernando de Alencastre, 1st Duke of Linares – the Viceroy of New Spain from 1711 to 1716 – becoming the first Indian to hold that post. He led his troops on several campaigns against the Navajo and in 1719 petitioned the Governor of New Mexico to launch an expedition against the Ute people.

== Villasur expedition ==
In 1720 he joined the Villasur expedition as chief scout and leader of 70 auxiliary troops. Intended to discover French people reputed to be living amongst the tribes of the Great Plains (Spain was then fighting the War of the Quadruple Alliance against France) the expedition went "farther into the interior than anyone from Spanish America had ever gone before". Reaching the Platte River the expedition was surprised by an attack of the Pawnee and Otoe on 14 August in which 46 of the party were killed including Naranjo and Villasur. The survivors retreated to Santa Fe but the expedition was a disaster; some one third of the military forces of New Mexico were lost. Naranjo had advised the governor of New Mexico, Antonio Valverde y Cosío, not to send the expedition but had been overruled.
