= José Antonio Guzmán Cruzat =

Chilean lawyer and academic

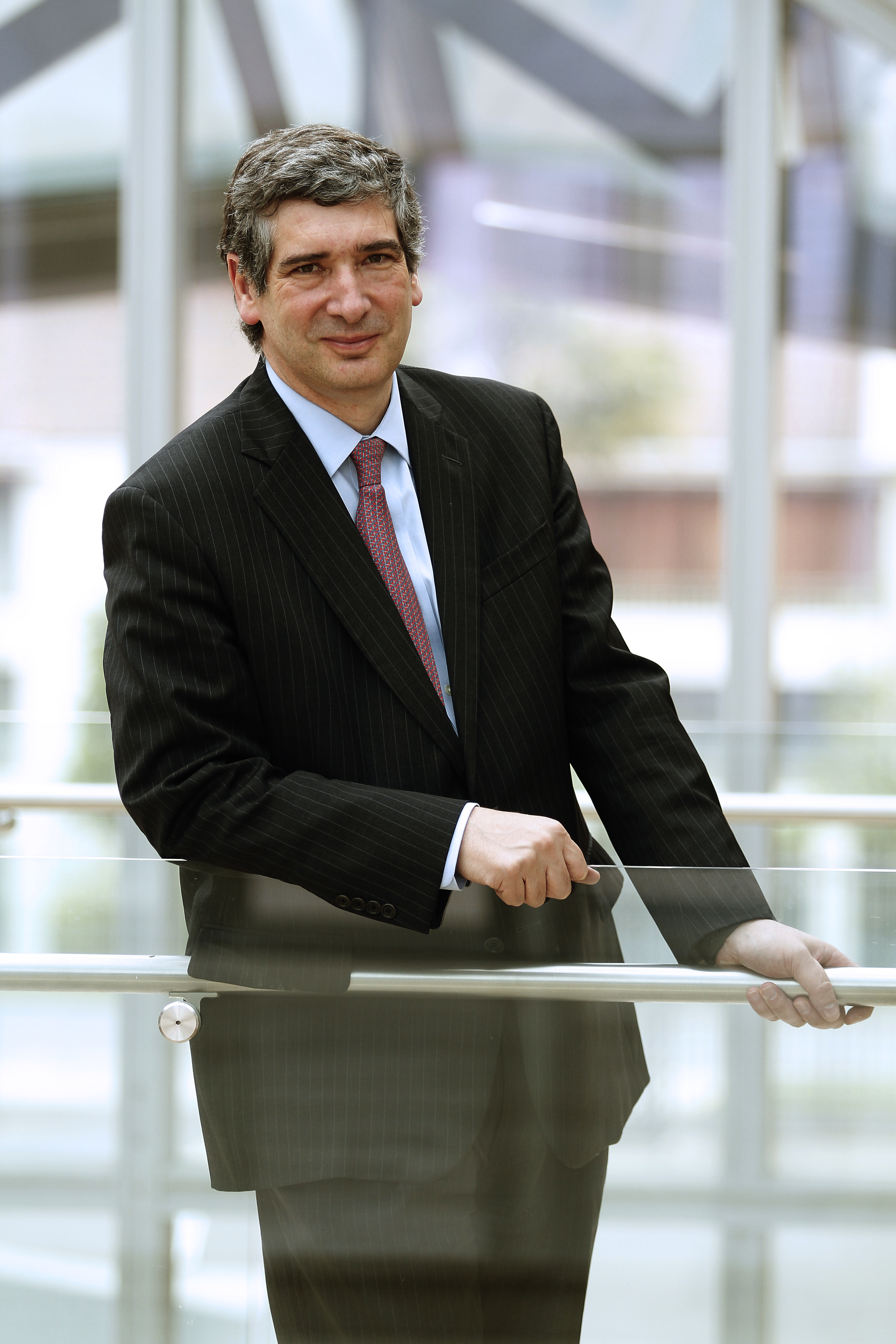

Chancellor of University of the Andes
- Incumbent
- Assumed office January 21, 2014
- Preceded by: Orlando Poblete

Personal details
- Born: January 4, 1967 (age 59) Santiago de Chile, Chile
- Education: Pontificia Universidad Católica de Chile; University of Pennsylvania
- Occupation: Lawyer

José Antonio Guzmán Cruzat (Santiago de Chile, January 14, 1967) is a Chilean lawyer and academic who currently serves as Chancellor of Universidad de los Andes, a position that he assumed for the first time on January 21, 2014, and for a second five-year term in January 2019.

== Education ==
He holds a PhD in education from the University of Pennsylvania in the United States with his doctoral dissertation titled "Fostering Quality Teaching in Chilean Universities" and a master's in education from Harvard University. In 2008 he completed the Senior Management Program (PADE) of the ESE Business School of the Universidad de los Andes. In 1985 he enrolled at the School of Law of Pontificia Universidad Católica de Chile, where he obtained a Law Degree in November 1991 with a thesis on Constitutional law. He was a student and assistant to former Senator Jaime Guzmán while studying at Universidad Católica.

== Academic career ==
In 1991, he joined Universidad de los Andes of Chile's Faculty of Law as a professor of Constitutional Law, of which he was its first academic secretary.

In 2006 he was appointed Academic Vice President, a position he held for four years. On January 21, 2014, he assumed the presidency of Universidad de los Andes. He is a member of the Standing Committee of the Higher Council of Universidad de los Andes (since July 2017 renamed the Presidential Council, due to an update of its bylaws), participating in all governance decisions.

In November 2018, the Board of Trustees of Universidad de los Andes renewed his appointment for a second five-year term. During this period, his opinion on various academic issues has been included in several national media sources.
