= Gervasio Cruzat y Góngora =

43rd Spanish Governor of New Mexico
- In office 1731–1736
- Preceded by: Juan Domingo de Bustamante
- Succeeded by: Enrique de Olivade y Michelena

Personal details
- Born: Pamplona (Navarre, Spain)
- Died: Unknown

Gervasio Cruzat y Góngora was Governor of New Mexico between 1731 and 1736 at a time when it was a province of New Spain, as well as governor of Presidio of Pensacola, in Florida, between 1740 and 1742. He assisted the bishop of Durango, taking evidence for him in his contest with the Franciscans.

== Biography ==
Góngora was a native of Pamplona (in Navarre, Spain) son of Juan Cruzat y Góngora and doña Josefa de Góngora, both of Pamplona. His father was Marquis of Góngora. His grandfather, Fausto Cruzat y Góngora, was governor and captain general of the Philippines and president of its audience. Both Juan and Fausto Cruzat y Góngora were knights of the Order of Santiago. Gervasio Cruzat y Góngora became a Colonel in the army, and in the spring of 1730 was dispatched to America to take over the government of the Province of New Mexico.

== Governor of New Mexico ==
Gervasio Cruzat y Gongora took office as Governor of New Mexico in 1731, succeeding Juan Domingo de Bustamante. The province at that time mostly consisted of a strip of irrigated land along the Rio Grande occupied by Pueblo Indians and Spanish settlers, surrounded by Plains Indians such as Navajo, Comanche and Apache.

=== Spanish ===
Records from Cruzat's term as governor include many cases dealing with questions of cattle and land, indicating that the economy of New Mexico was prospering. Cruzat authorized construction of an acequia, or irrigation channel, through Albuquerque, overruling the objections of some landowners. Cruzat reluctantly permitted Fray José de Irigoyen of San Ildefonso to build a new church in Santa Cruz, using Indian laborers, as a public works project for the benefit of the colony. Cruzat followed the formal approach of writing to the viceroy in Mexico City. His letter of 14 July 1732 was answered by a letter dated 31 October 1732. The license to build was received in Santa Cruz in June 1733. He heard various cases against local officials involving abuses against the Pueblo Indians such as extortion and forced labor, generally ruling in favor of the Indians. Officials who were dismissed in 1733 included the alcalde of Bernalillo and the alcalde mayor of Laguna and Acoma. In 1735 the lieutenant alcalde of Chama was found guilty of trading illegally with the Comanches, dismissed and fined.

=== Pueblo Indians ===
In 1732 Cruzat banned gambling, drinking, and prostitution in the pueblos. The Pueblo leaders had become sophisticated in working within Spanish laws and dealing with officials, and Cruzat often gave them his support. In 1733 he decided in favor of the Pueblo Indians of Isleta in a dispute with one Diego de Padilla, whose flocks had trespassed on the Pueblo farmlands. In 1734 Santa Ana Pueblo tried to buy land from Baltasar Romero that they claimed was their traditional property. Despite the fact that the pueblo was willing to pay, Cruzat nullified the sale, which he said was "against the dispositions of the royal laws of his majesty". This seems to have been his personal decision, since there does not appear to have been any law against the sale.

=== Plains Indians ===
Cruzat issued a Bando to the alcades mayores of New Mexico asking them to notify their people of an expedition that would leave Galisteo on 30 March 1732 for the salt lakes. This small campaign against the Apaches took some captives who were sold into slavery, as was customary at the time. In 1732 Cruzat prohibited sale of these captives to the Pueblo Indians.

In 1733 Cruzat gave the Franciscans permission to found the mission of Jicarilla Apaches on the Rio Trampas in Taos County, about 12 miles (19 km) north of Taos, which could also serve as a defensive post. Fray Juan Mirabel, who took charge of the mission, considered that since the Jicarillas were Christians they could rightfully make war on the Comanches, who had not been converted. The mission was abandoned when Cruzat prohibited the trade in hides.

In 1733 Cruzat received a petition by a group of Plains Indians who called themselves "Los Genízaros" asking for a grant of land at the abandoned Sandia Pueblo. They told the governor that they had all been baptized and that none of them were servants of the Spanish. The petitioners claimed that they had become destitute while serving as scouts on the border with Apache territory. The governor asked them to identify themselves by name and "nation", then denied the petition without giving any reason. He told them that they should settle in established towns and villages.

Cruzat ordered the settlers at Santa Cruz not to allow their animals to stray loose and tempt Indian raids. He issued an order on 23 June 1733 that all citizens of New Mexico be prepared for military duty. In 1734 Juan Paez Hurtado held a council or war at Albuquerque to discuss a possible campaign against the Apaches. However, there was no further military action during Cruzat's term of office. In 1735 Cruzat's term of office expired and he was replaced by Henrique de Olavide y Michelena.

== Last years ==
In 1740, Cruzat y Góngora was appointed governor of Presidio of Pensacola, in Florida, charge he held until 1742.
