= Juan Páez Hurtado =

Colonial Governor of New Mexico (1668–1724)

33rd Spanish Governor of New Mexico
- In office 1704–1705
- Preceded by: Diego de Vargas
- Succeeded by: Francisco Cuervo y Valdés

39th Spanish Governor of New Mexico (Acting)
- In office 1716–1717
- Preceded by: Antonio Valverde y Cosío
- Succeeded by: Antonio Valverde y Cosío

Personal details
- Born: On December 14, 1668 (he was baptized December 22, 1668) Villafranca de las Marismas, in Seville (Andalusia, Spain)
- Died: May 5, 1742 (aged 73) Santa Fe New Mexico
- Profession: Captain General, governor and mayor

Juan Páez Hurtado (born on December 14, 1668 – May 5, 1742) was a Spanish official. He was Captain General, Governor and Mayor of Santa Fe de Nuevo Mexico.

== Early life ==
Hurtado was born in Villafranca de las Marismas, near Seville (Andalusia, Spain). He was baptized in the parish of Santa María la Blanca on December 22, 1668. He was raised in a humble family. When he was a teenager he enlisted in the Spanish Royal Army as a cape, in Seville.

== Career ==
He attained the General and Sergeant grades. Eventually, he sailed across the Atlantic Ocean heading to New Spain. He participated in many battles.

In Michoacán (in the present Mexico), he joined to the troops of Mayor Diego de Vargas. Hurtado later moved to New Mexico. After Vargas' death he became senior Captain General and Governor of New Mexico. In addition, Hurtado was twice Mayor of the capital Santa Fe: between 1704 and 1705 and between 1716 and 1717.

Under his governance, The Faraones Apaches stole the horses and mules of the Spanish. In 1714, Hurtado was chosen to led an expedition in order to find the Apaches and punish them, but the expedition was unsuccessful.

== Personal life ==
In Michoacán he married Pascuala López Vera, with whom he had a daughter in 1688.

On June 30, 1704 he married Teodora Garcia De La Riva, with whom he had three children: Antonia, Gertrudis, Juan Domingo Paez Hurtado

He died on May 5, 1742. He is buried under the "Altar of the Basilica of Santa María, la conquistadora" (In English: Saint Mary, the Conqueror), Patroness of New Mexico.
