= Lake Scott State Park =

State park in Kansas, United States

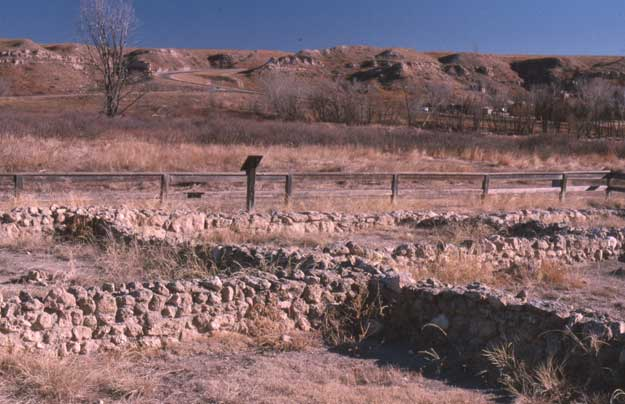
- El Cuartelejo pueblo ruins

- Location within Kansas Location within the United States
- Interactive map of Lake Scott State Park
- Location: Scott County, Kansas, United States
- Coordinates: 38°40′32″N 100°55′00″W
- Area: 1,020 acres (410 ha)
- Elevation: 2,818 ft (859 m)
- Established: 1928
- Administrator: Kansas Department of Wildlife and Parks
- Visitors: 222,860 (in 2022)
- Website: Official website
- Kansas State Parks

Lake Scott State Park is a 1,020-acre (410 ha) Kansas state park in Scott County, Kansas in the United States. The park was established in 1928 following a donation of the land by the Herbert Steele family. The park, also known as Scott State Park, surrounds Lake Scott, a spring-fed freshwater lake. Lake Scott State Park is between Oakley and Scott City, about one mile west of U.S. Route 83 on Route K-95. The park is open for year-round recreation including camping, hunting, fishing, hiking, boating and picnicking. Lake Scott State Park is home to the only known Indian pueblo in Kansas, El Cuartelejo.

== History ==
Lake Scott State Park is the site of a ruined Taos Pueblo. The Taos arrived in western Kansas in 1664. After having escaped the Spanish colonial rule in New Mexico. They formed an alliance with a group of Plains Apache. The Taos Indians built the protective pueblos and an irrigation system from a nearby spring to water their crops. The settlement, known as El Cuartelejo, was occupied for 20 years before the builders returned to their home territory. The pueblo was reoccupied in 1696 by a group of Picuri Indians. The Picuris were compelled to retreat to their homelands in colonial New Mexico ten years later.

The Picuri were the last Native Americans to occupy the pueblo. A Spanish expedition used the pueblo in 1720 on a journey to the north and west to determine the strength of the French in the area. The expeditionary forces were attacked by a group of Pawnee about 150 miles (240 km) from El Cuartelejo. The Spanish considered using the structure as a frontier station, but cancelled the undertaking due to its remote location from their supplies in New Mexico. The last known settlement at the pueblo was recorded in 1727 when local Indians reported that it was being used by French traders. The effects of weather and erosion caused the structure to disappear, leaving just a "slight mound" and some irrigation ditches.

Herbert Steele discovered the ruins in 1889. They were excavated by archaeologists from the University of Kansas. In 1964, the El Cuartelejo ruins were designated a National Historic Landmark. In 1970, the site has been excavated to reveal that the pueblo was a seven-room structure, enough to house a small band of Indians. The foundations of the pueblo were reconstructed at this time and are open to the public with interpretive signs and displays. Near the pueblo are traces of shallow ditches extending from the nearby springs.

Herbert Steele arrived in Scott County in 1888. He established his homestead on what is now Lake Scott State Park soon after. He and his wife Eliza Landon lived there at first in a dugout and later built a four-room house of native sandstone. The original home is now a museum and displays furniture and tools used by the early settlers of Scott County. The Steeles donated their property to the Kansas Forestry, Fish and Game Commission in 1928.

== Recreation ==
Lake Scott State Park is open for year-round recreation. There are 55 modern and 175 primitive campsites on the campgrounds. Two modern restroom facilities are provided. There is a swimming beach on the lake with a playground nearby. A concessionaire sells fishing and camping supplies and also rents out canoes and pedal boats.

There are several miles of trails in the park that are open to hiking and horseback riding. The trails venture into wild areas were wildlife can be observed. Commonly seen wild animals include wild turkey, deer, beaver, and bobcat. Hunting is permitted in the wildlife area that is just west of the park. Lake Scott is open to fishing. Common game fish include Redear Sunfish, Green Sunfish, Crappie, Channel Catfish, Largemouth Bass, Trout, Walleye, Bluegill and Black Bullhead.
