= Scott City, Kansas =

City in Scott County, Kansas

- City and County seat
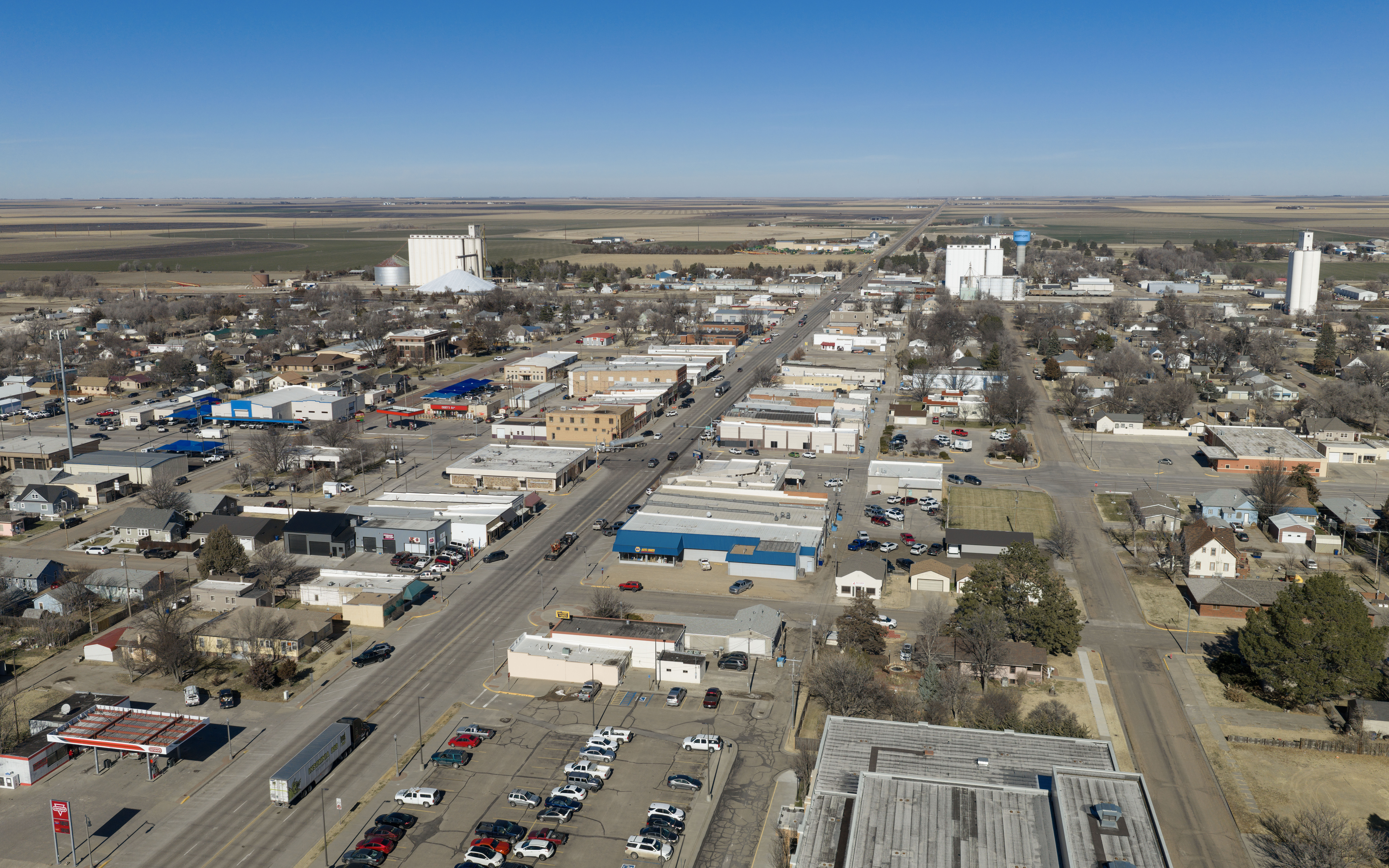
- Downtown skyview (2026)

- Location within Scott County and Kansas

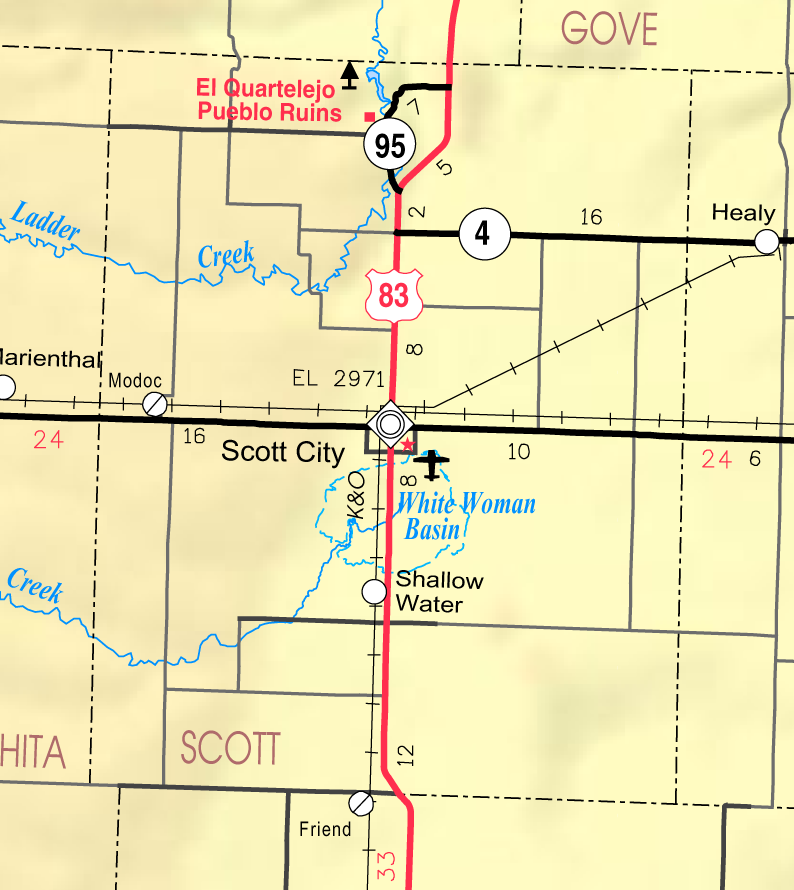
- KDOT map of Scott County (legend)
- Coordinates: 38°28′44″N 100°54′11″W
- Country: United States
- State: Kansas
- County: Scott
- Founded: 1885
- Incorporated: 1887
- Named for: Winfield Scott

Area
  - Total: 2.71 sq mi (7.03 km^{2})
  - Land: 2.71 sq mi (7.03 km^{2})
  - Water: 0 sq mi (0.00 km^{2})
- Elevation: 2,969 ft (905 m)

Population (2020)
  - Total: 4,113
  - Density: 1,520/sq mi (585/km^{2})
- Time zone: UTC-6 (CST)
  - Summer (DST): UTC-5 (CDT)
- ZIP Code: 67871
- Area code: 620
- FIPS code: 20-63600
- GNIS ID: 2396558
- Website: scottcityks.org

Scott City is a city in and the county seat of Scott County, Kansas, United States. As of the 2020 census, the population of the city was 4,113.

== History ==
=== Early history ===
For millennia, the Great Plains of North America were inhabited by nomadic Native Americans. From the 16th to 18th centuries, the Kingdom of France claimed ownership of large parts of North America. In 1762, after the French and Indian War, France secretly ceded New France to Spain, by the Treaty of Fontainebleau.

=== 19th century ===
In 1802, Spain returned most of the land to France, keeping title to about 7,500 square miles. In 1803, most of the land for modern day Kansas was acquired by the United States from France as part of the 828,000 square mile Louisiana Purchase. In 1854, the Kansas Territory was organized under the provisions of the Kansas–Nebraska Act, then in 1861 Kansas became the 34th U.S. state. In 1873, Scott County was established, which included the land for modern day Scott City.

Scott City was founded in 1885. Like Scott County, the city is named in recognition of a United States General, Winfield Scott. In October 1884, two women from Chicago, Illinois claimed the land that Scott City is on and built a cabin. The following February, two men from Chicago came to the cabin and settled. Soon after, many people started arriving in the county and Scott City was then founded in 1885. Before being founded, Mrs. M.E. De Geer, one of the women that came from Chicago, started a newspaper called the Western Times in March 1885. The county then started to fill rapidly.

Scott County was legally instituted in 1873 by an act of legislature. At this time it was named in honor of General Winfield Scott. Since it was such a small town with a small population, there was no need for a local government. Therefore, it was connected to Ford County for judicial matters.

== Geography ==
According to the United States Census Bureau, the city has a total area of 2.63 square miles (6.81 km^{2}), all land. It is located in the Great Plains and at the elevation of 2979 ft.

=== Climate ===
According to the Köppen Climate Classification system, Scott City has a semi-arid climate, abbreviated "BSk" on climate maps.

Climate data for Scott City, Kansas, 1991–2020 normals, extremes 1895–present
Month	Jan	Feb	Mar	Apr	May	Jun	Jul	Aug	Sep	Oct	Nov	Dec	Year
Record high °F (°C)	81 (27)	87 (31)	98 (37)	98 (37)	104 (40)	111 (44)	114 (46)	108 (42)	107 (42)	99 (37)	88 (31)	82 (28)	114 (46)
Mean maximum °F (°C)	67.3 (19.6)	72.8 (22.7)	82.8 (28.2)	89.1 (31.7)	95.0 (35.0)	101.6 (38.7)	103.6 (39.8)	101.0 (38.3)	97.5 (36.4)	91.3 (32.9)	77.2 (25.1)	66.4 (19.1)	104.5 (40.3)
Mean daily maximum °F (°C)	43.9 (6.6)	47.3 (8.5)	57.8 (14.3)	66.6 (19.2)	76.5 (24.7)	87.7 (30.9)	92.5 (33.6)	89.8 (32.1)	82.3 (27.9)	69.3 (20.7)	55.5 (13.1)	44.9 (7.2)	67.8 (19.9)
Daily mean °F (°C)	29.9 (−1.2)	33.0 (0.6)	42.2 (5.7)	51.0 (10.6)	61.7 (16.5)	73.0 (22.8)	78.0 (25.6)	75.6 (24.2)	67.3 (19.6)	53.8 (12.1)	40.8 (4.9)	31.2 (−0.4)	53.1 (11.8)
Mean daily minimum °F (°C)	15.9 (−8.9)	18.7 (−7.4)	26.7 (−2.9)	35.4 (1.9)	46.9 (8.3)	58.3 (14.6)	63.4 (17.4)	61.4 (16.3)	52.3 (11.3)	38.4 (3.6)	26.0 (−3.3)	17.5 (−8.1)	38.4 (3.6)
Mean minimum °F (°C)	−0.6 (−18.1)	2.6 (−16.3)	9.6 (−12.4)	21.4 (−5.9)	32.6 (0.3)	45.8 (7.7)	54.7 (12.6)	52.5 (11.4)	38.2 (3.4)	22.7 (−5.2)	10.0 (−12.2)	−0.2 (−17.9)	−6.4 (−21.3)
Record low °F (°C)	−26 (−32)	−19 (−28)	−19 (−28)	4 (−16)	19 (−7)	34 (1)	41 (5)	39 (4)	23 (−5)	4 (−16)	−9 (−23)	−21 (−29)	−26 (−32)
Average precipitation inches (mm)	0.44 (11)	0.52 (13)	1.13 (29)	1.88 (48)	2.65 (67)	3.16 (80)	3.06 (78)	3.05 (77)	1.45 (37)	1.53 (39)	0.64 (16)	0.67 (17)	20.18 (512)
Average snowfall inches (cm)	4.5 (11)	4.0 (10)	3.9 (9.9)	1.8 (4.6)	0.0 (0.0)	0.0 (0.0)	0.0 (0.0)	0.0 (0.0)	0.0 (0.0)	1.2 (3.0)	1.1 (2.8)	3.1 (7.9)	19.6 (49.2)
Average precipitation days (≥ 0.01 in)	3.0	3.5	4.5	6.2	8.4	8.0	7.9	8.1	5.8	4.8	3.2	3.0	66.4
Average snowy days (≥ 0.1 in)	2.2	2.1	1.6	0.6	0.0	0.0	0.0	0.0	0.0	0.3	1.0	1.9	9.7
Source 1: NOAA
Source 2: National Weather Service

== Demographics ==
Historical population
Census	Pop.	Note	%±
1890	229		—
1900	212		−7.4%
1910	918		333.0%
1920	1,112		21.1%
1930	1,544		38.8%
1940	1,848		19.7%
1950	3,204		73.4%
1960	3,555		11.0%
1970	4,001		12.5%
1980	4,154		3.8%
1990	3,785		−8.9%
2000	3,855		1.8%
2010	3,816		−1.0%
2020	4,113		7.8%
2025 (est.)	3,855		−6.3%
U.S. Decennial Census

=== 2020 census ===
As of the 2020 census, Scott City had a population of 4,113. The median age was 38.0 years. 26.2% of residents were under the age of 18 and 19.5% of residents were 65 years of age or older. For every 100 females there were 96.2 males, and for every 100 females age 18 and over there were 95.2 males age 18 and over.

0.0% of residents lived in urban areas, while 100.0% lived in rural areas.

There were 1,629 households in Scott City, of which 33.3% had children under the age of 18 living in them. Of all households, 54.1% were married-couple households, 18.0% were households with a male householder and no spouse or partner present, and 22.6% were households with a female householder and no spouse or partner present. About 30.3% of all households were made up of individuals and 14.5% had someone living alone who was 65 years of age or older.

There were 1,795 housing units, of which 9.2% were vacant. The homeowner vacancy rate was 1.9% and the rental vacancy rate was 9.0%.

Racial composition as of the 2020 census
Race	Number	Percent
White	3,234	78.6%
Black or African American	9	0.2%
American Indian and Alaska Native	37	0.9%
Asian	13	0.3%
Native Hawaiian and Other Pacific Islander	7	0.2%
Some other race	307	7.5%
Two or more races	506	12.3%
Hispanic or Latino (of any race)	927	22.5%

=== 2010 census ===
As of the census of 2010, there were 3,816 people, 1,583 households, and 1,029 families residing in the city. The population density was 1,451.0 inhabitants per square mile (560.2/km^{2}). There were 1,710 housing units at an average density of 650.2 per square mile (251.0/km^{2}). The racial makeup of the city was 89.4% White, 0.4% African American, 0.5% Native American, 0.5% Asian, 7.8% from other races, and 1.4% from two or more races. Hispanics or Latinos of any race were 17.3% of the population.

There were 1,583 households, of which 29.4% had children under the age of 18 living with them, 54.0% were married couples living together, 6.3% had a female householder with no husband present, 4.7% had a male householder with no wife present, and 35.0% were non-families. 30.4% of all households were made up of individuals, and 15.8% had someone living alone who was 65 years of age or older. The average household size was 2.34 and the average family size was 2.93.

The median age in the city was 42 years. 24% of residents were under the age of 18; 7% were between the ages of 18 and 24; 22.4% were from 25 to 44; 27% were from 45 to 64; and 19.7% were 65 years of age or older. The gender makeup of the city was 49.8% male and 50.2% female.

== Economy ==
Grain elevator skyview (2026)

The top employers are:

- Agriculture
- Healthcare
- Education

== Government ==
Scott City is governed by a mayor and a city council who are elected by the residents of Scott City. The mayor and city council compose the governing body and control the government affairs of the city. The council consists of eight elected members. The mayor serves for two years and the council members serve for four. The current mayor is Everett Green (2017-).

== Education ==
The community is served by Scott County USD 466 public school district. The mascot is the beaver, and a giant welded beaver is on display at the football field.

== Arts and culture ==
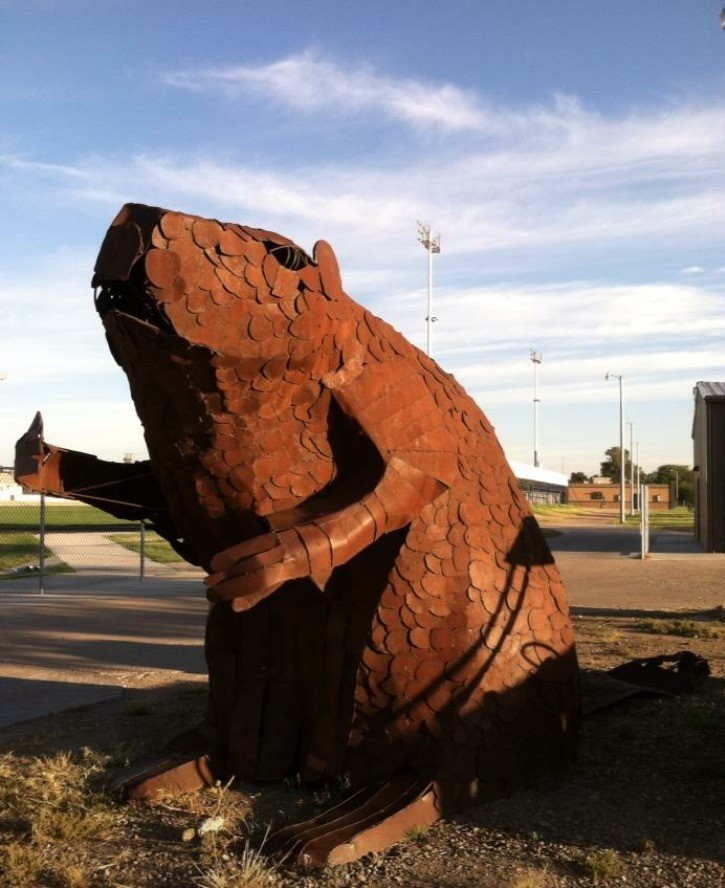
Beaver mascot (2016)

The El Quartelejo Museum and the Jerry Thomas Gallery and Collection are co-located in the city. Their collections cover much of the region's geologic, Indian, and pioneer history. The Gallery also contains artwork by Jerry Thomas, an artist originally from Scott City. Many of the paintings are inspired by local history or artifacts in the collection. The Apache and Puebloan site, El Cuartelejo (also spelled El Quartelejo), can be found in the eastern section of Lake Scott State Park.

== Sister City ==
On September 23, 2023, the City of Scott City entered into an agreement with the Northern Cheyenne Tribe to form a Sister City relationship. Scott City is only the second U.S. city to form a Sister City union with a sovereign tribal nation.

== Annual events ==
The Scott County Free Fair is an annual event held in Scott City. There is a livestock show as well as many events.

The Whimmydiddle Arts and Crafts Fair is held on the last Saturday of September in the Scott City Park.

Beefiesta is held yearly to celebrate the beef industry in Scott County, one of the largest cattle feeding counties in the state. The Beefiesta BBQ is held during the Scott County Free Fair. The city also hosts Beef Tasting Booths at the city park immediately following the parade.

Every July 4, a fireworks show is exhibited on the east side of town near the baseball fields. Nearby Scott County Lake also holds a fireworks show on the lake shore.

On the third weekend in August, the Lake Scott Car Club hosts the Lake Scott Rod Run.

One weekend every fall, the Sunflower Futurity and Derby is held at the Scott City Indoor Arena. Barrel Racers compete against a few hundred others. Open Barrel Race, Seniors Barrel Race, and Juniors & Pee-Wee Barrel Races are put on as well as the actual barrel races.

The annual Carp Contest is held at Lake Scott State Park one weekend during the summer months. The event is put on by the Chamber of Commerce, Lake Scott State Park, and Friends of Lake Scott.

The M.A.S.H. Golf Tournament is typically held on the second weekend in June. This tournament is limited to 18 teams and lasts for about 6 hours.

== Media ==
The official newspaper is The Scott County Record. This weekly publication has been in business since 1993. In 2016, editor Rod Haxton was honored by the Kansas Press Association with the Clyde M. Reed Master Editor Award.

== Infrastructure ==
=== Transportation ===
K-96 and US-83 highways intersect the city.

The Scott City Airport is a rapidly growing mode of transportation in Scott County. In 2009, the runway was repaved and now measures 75 ft x 5002 ft. The airport is publicly owned and located on the SE side of Scott City.

== Notable people ==
- Ron Baker, former NBA player for the New York Knicks and Washington Wizards

== See also ==
- El Cuartelejo Apache and Puebloan site
- Northern Cheyenne Exodus
