= Fausto Cruzat y Góngora =

33rd Governor-General of the Philippines
- In office 25 July 1690 – 8 December 1701
- Monarchs: Charles II of Spain; Philip V of Spain
- Governor: (Viceroy of New Spain); Gaspar de la Cerda, 8th Count of Galve; Juan Ortega y Montañés; José Sarmiento de Valladares, 1st Duke of Atrisco
- Preceded by: Alonso de Avila Fuertes
- Succeeded by: Domingo Zabálburu de Echevarrí

Personal details
- Died: 14 June 1702 Pacific Ocean
- Profession: Soldier

Fausto Cruzat y Góngora († 14 June 1702, on the Pacific aboard the Manila galleon en route to Acapulco) was a Spanish Governor-General of the Philippines from 1690 to 1701, therefore the second-longest serving governor after Rafael María de Aguilar (governor from 1793 to 1806). He is thought to be one of the most capable of the Spanish colonial officials in his day.

== Biography ==
Fausto Cruzat y Góngora was born in Pamplona into a distinguished family in the nobility of Navarre. He became a soldier and a knight of the Order of Santiago. He arrived in the Philippines in July 1690, assuming control of the government from the Real Audiencia of Manila. He immediately began the task of overhauling the administration as well as improving and streamlining taxation. He settled a large debt owed to the Caja Real in Mexico City, and reduced expenses to the level that the islands could become self-sufficient. He rebuilt the Palacio del Gobernador in Manila on its present site, with two wings separated by an open atrium. His residence was on the second floor of the south wing, and his secretariat on the lower floor. The northern wing was occupied by the Real Audiencia (Royal Supreme Court).

On 1 October 1696, he issued a new set of governance rules, based on rules drawn up fifty years before by Sebastián Hurtado de Corcuera. The rules ensured that alcaldes mayores and other local authorities were strictly subordinate to the crown and that no major decision was taking place without approval by royal officials in Manila. Mechanisms to prevent corruption included a prohibition on accepting gifts. The rules instituted annual inspections by the alcaldes mayores in their territories. Filipinos were given greater legal rights and guarantees, and were allowed to engage in industry or commerce.

Cruzat had to deal with disputes within the Catholic Church in Southeast Asia. In late 1697, the archbishop of Manila Diego Camacho y Ávila appointed secular clergy to the parishes, but the friars of the regular orders refused to give up control of the churches. In response, Governor Cruzat sent soldiers to occupy these churches and remove them by force. This did not solve the problem, because there were not enough secular clergy in the islands, thus leaving many parishes without priests. The problem remained until the archbishop was transferred to Guadalajara, Mexico, in 1706.

Another problem arose when the crown ordered the regularization of all land property titles. The regular orders were by far the largest landholders in the Philippines, but they refused to show the inspector their titles. Two bishops became involved on different sides in the dispute, one supporting the friars and the other the inspector. The argument mounted to the point where the bishops mutually excommunicated each other. It took all of Cruzat's tact to obtain a compromise and restore peaces among the prelates.

Philip V of Spain, the first monarch of the House of Bourbon, inherited the crown on 1 November 1700. Fausto Cruzat was replaced as governor by Domingo Zabálburu de Echevarrí in December 1701. He died on 14 June 1702 on his way back to Spain via Mexico, aboard of the Acapulco galleon.

His son Juan Cruzat y Góngora was later made Marques de Góngora. His grandson Gervasio Cruzat y Góngora became governor of New Mexico.
