= Villasur expedition =

1720 Spanish expedition in North America

- Part of the War of the Quadruple Alliance
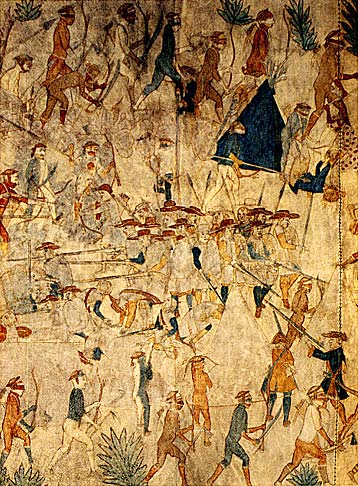
- Villasur expedition painted on buffalo hide (Note: Jesuit missionary Philipp Segesser sent three buffalo hide paintings to his brother in Switzerland in 1758.)
Date	June 16 – August 14, 1720
Location	Near Columbus, Nebraska
Result	Pawnee–Otoe victory

Belligerents
Pawnee; Otoe; France (disputed)	Spain; Pueblo; Apache

Commanders and leaders
Unknown	Pedro de Villasur †; José Naranjo †

Strength
Unknown	117

Casualties and losses
Unknown	47 killed

The Villasur expedition of 1720 was a Spanish military expedition intended to check New France's growing influence on the North American Great Plains, led by Lieutenant-General Pedro de Villasur. Pawnee and Otoe Indians attacked the expedition in Nebraska, killing 36 of the 40 Spaniards, 10 of their Indian allies, and a French guide. The survivors retreated to their base in New Mexico.

== Background ==
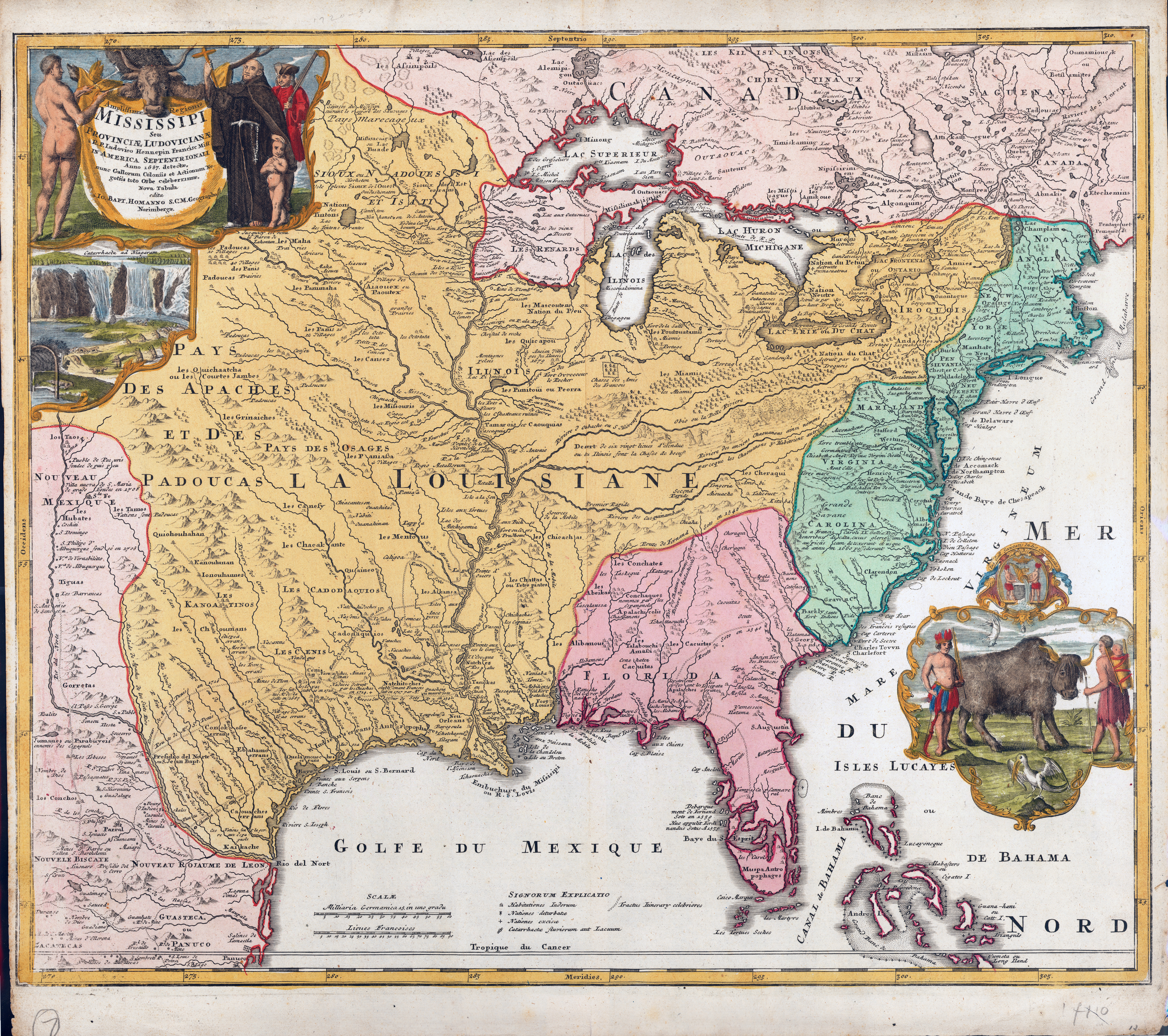
1720 map of French Louisiana

In the first part of the 18th century, French explorers and fur traders began to enter the plains west of the Missouri River, which they claimed as Louisiana. In 1714, Étienne de Veniard, Sieur de Bourgmont became the first colonial explorer known to have reached the mouth of the Platte River, although other French traders may have visited the area and lived among the Indians. Spain had claimed ownership of the Great Plains since the Coronado expedition of the 16th century, but had done little to assert this claim, and was now worried about the growing French influence in the region. In 1718, the War of the Quadruple Alliance broke out between France and Spain.

== Expedition ==
Antonio Valverde y Cosío, governor of the Spanish colony of Nuevo México based in Santa Fe, ordered Villasur to capture French traders on the plains. Spanish authorities hoped to gather intelligence about French ambitions in the region. Villasur had no experience with Indians, but he left Santa Fe on June 16, 1720, leading an expedition which included about 40 soldiers of a mounted frontier corps known as cuera or leather soldiers (Note: So called because of the protective leather clothing that Spanish frontier troops wore.), 60 to 70 Pueblo allies, a priest, a Spanish trader, and approximately 12 Apache guides, who were tribal enemies of the Pawnee. Scout leader José Naranjo was of African-Hopi parentage, and he might have previously reached the South Platte River area.

The expedition made its way northeast through Colorado, Kansas, and Nebraska. In August, they made contact with the Pawnee and Otoe along the Platte and Loup rivers. Villasur made several attempts to negotiate with Indians in the area, using Francisco Sistaca, a Pawnee held as a slave, to translate. On August 13, Sistaca disappeared from camp. Villasur camped that night just south of the Loup–Platte confluence near present-day Columbus, Nebraska, nervous about the possibility of attack and the increasing number and belligerence of the Pawnee and Otoe Indians.

== Battle ==
The Pawnees and Otoes attacked at dawn on August 14, shooting with muskets and unleashing flights of arrows, then charging into combat clad only in body paint, headbands, moccasins, and short leggings. Some survivors reported that Frenchmen had been among the attackers, and men in European dress are shown in a surviving painting of the battle. The Spanish were mostly asleep at this hour; possibly Sistaca had told the Pawnees the best time to attack. In a brief battle, they killed 36 Spaniards, including Villasur and Naranjo, 10 Pueblo scouts, and Jean L'Archevêque, a Frenchman who had been brought as an interpreter. The Pueblo allies of the Spanish force were encamped nearby, but separately, and were not the first targets of the attack; most of them escaped. The few cuera soldiers who escaped were those holding and riding horses, who were able to break loose while their comrades attempted to form a defensive cluster.

== Aftermath ==
The Spanish and Pueblo survivors returned to Santa Fe on September 6. The expedition had journeyed further to the north and east than any other Spanish military expedition, and its defeat marked the end of Spanish influence on the central Great Plains. The governors of New Mexico inquired into and apportioned blame for the disaster over the next seven years. The French in Illinois were elated to learn of the battle in October, but subsequent French expeditions did not establish French trade and influence in the area.
