= Francisco Cuervo y Valdés =

Spanish politician

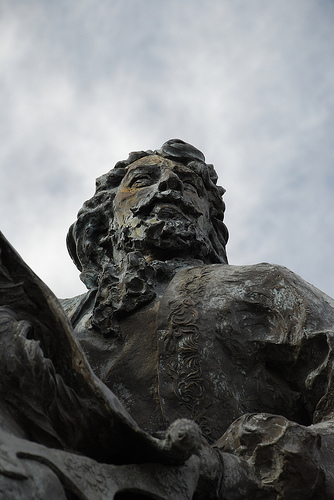
- Francisco Cuervo y Valdés

18th Governor of Nuevo León
- In office 1687–1688
- Preceded by: Antonio de Echevérez y Subiza
- Succeeded by: Pedro Fernández de la Ventosa

3rd Governor of Texas and 5th of Coahuila
- In office 1698 – 1702 (Texas) / 1703 (Coahuila)
- Preceded by: Gregorio de Salinas Varona
- Succeeded by: Mathias de Aguirre

34th Spanish Governor of New Mexico
- In office June 1705 – August 1707
- Preceded by: Juan Páez Hurtado
- Succeeded by: Jose Chacón Medina Salazar y Villaseñor

Personal details
- Born: 16 June 1651 Asturias, Spain
- Died: 1714 (aged 62–63) Mexico City, New Spain, Spanish Empire
- Profession: Politician
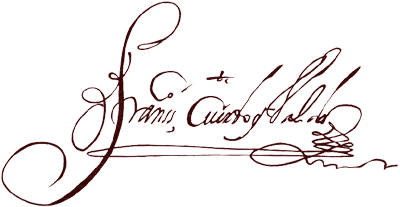
- Signature

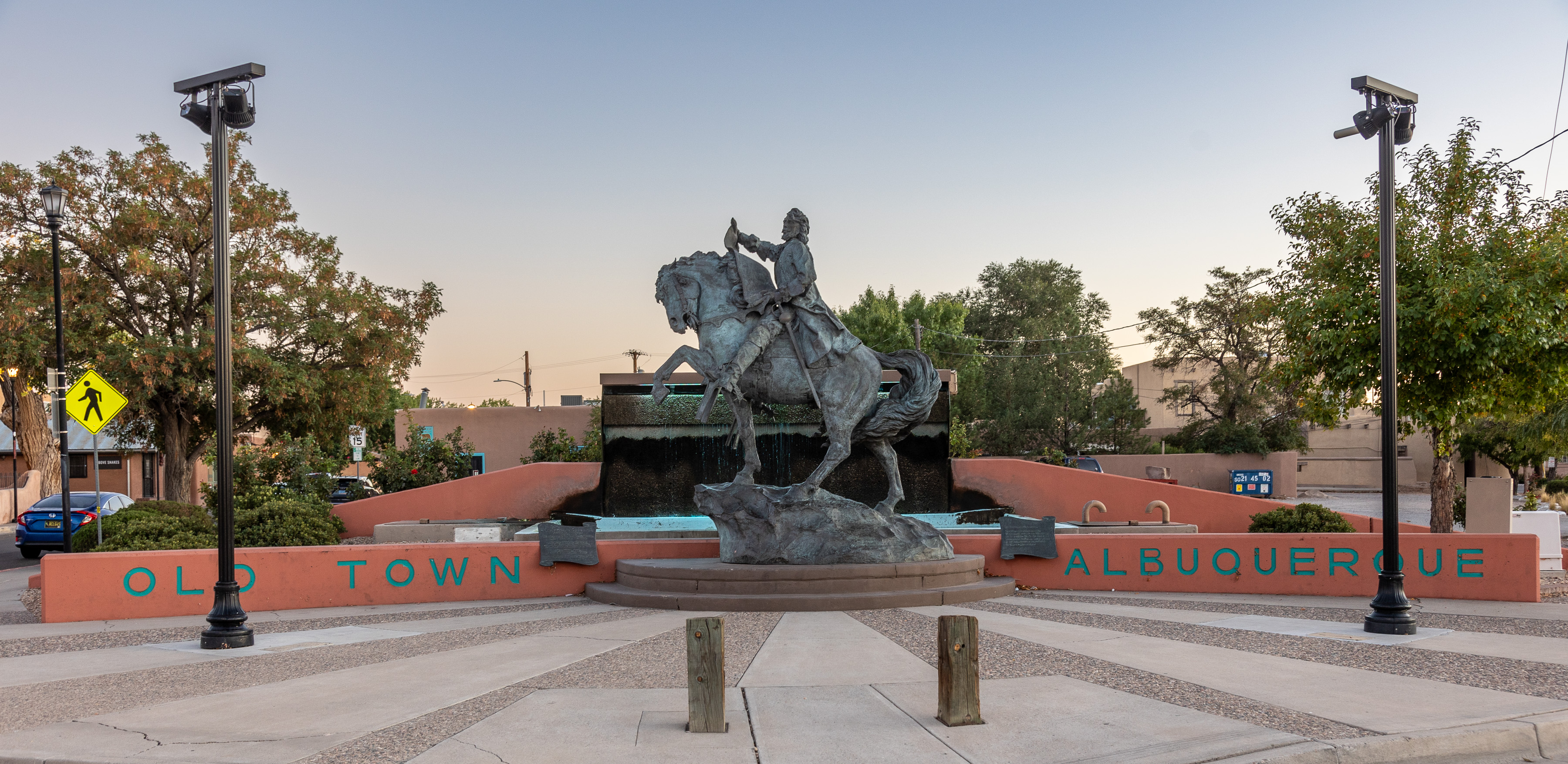
A statue of Francisco Cuervo y Valdés greets visitors at the entrance to Old Town Albuquerque

Francisco Cuervo y Valdés (16 June 1651 – 1714) was a Spanish politician who governed Nuevo León (1687-1688), Nueva Extremadura (1698–1703), New Philippines (1698–1702), and Santa Fe de Nuevo México (1704–1707).

== Early years ==
Cuervo y Valdés was born on June 16, 1651, in Santa María de Grado (in Asturias, Spain). His family was of noble background. Cuervo y Valdes was a Knight of Santiago and a Treasury official in Guadalajara. In 1678, he emigrated to New Spain, in what is now Mexico.

== Career ==
Upon arrival to New Spain, he served as an infantry captain and later he was appointed lieutenant governor of Sonora. In 1698, Cuervo y Valdés served as lieutenant governor of Nuevo Leon and Coahuila (in what is now modern Mexico). From 1698 to 1702, he served as the third governor of Spanish Texas.

Under his administration, a series of missions were founded: San Antonio Galindo Moctezuma (founded by Cuervo y Valdés and Friar Francisco Portoles on October 26, 1698), Mission San Felipe Valladares (November, 1698), the mission of Valle de San Bartolome de Jesus later renamed "Santísimo Nombre de Jesus de los Peyotes" (founded by Sergeant Mayor Diego Ramón on December 18, 1698), the mission of San Juan Bautista and the Valle of Santo Domingo (1699), the Mission of San Francisco de Solano (by Antonio de Olivares in 1700), Nuestra Señora de Guadalupe and Santo Cristo (1701), and the mission of San Bernardo (1703).

In 1704, Cuervo y Valdés was appointed acting governor of New Mexico by the Viceroy of New Spain, Francisco Fernández de la Cueva Enríquez, Duke of Alburquerque. Thus, Cuervo y Valdés had to leave the government of Coahuila, taking office on March 10, 1705.

Upon arrival in the province, Cuervo y Valdés found that social and political conditions were quite poor. This being a result of the continuing war between the Apaches and the Navajos against the Spanish settlers and Pueblos, who were allied with the Spanish. Cuervo y Valdés led troops against the Apaches, but the number of soldiers was too small to effectively defend the territory. This led him to send a letter to the Viceroy of New Spain requesting reinforcements but the viceroy did not attend the request. Shortly after, he asked the Puebloans for assistance, who agreed to join his troops. With the soldiers in need of supplies, Cuervo y Valdés again requested assistance from the viceroy in securing weapons, ammunition, and clothing. However, only a small amount of weapons and ammunition was sent to New Mexico.

On April 23, 1706, Cuervo y Valdés founded La Villa Real de San Francisco de Alburquerque (now Albuquerque), naming the town in honour of the Viceroy of New Spain, Francisco Fernández de la Cueva Enríquez, Duke of Alburquerque. Cuervo y Valdés ordered that a Spanish garrison be stationed in the town. At the time, Albuquerque was inhabited by thirty to thirty-five families who had settled along the banks of the Rio Grande.

Cuervo y Valdés refounded several other towns in New Mexico, including Santa Maria de Galisteo (formerly known as Santa Cruz), which was populated by about eighteen families from Tanos. He left office in 1707.

Cuervo y Valdés eventually returned to Mexico City and died in 1714.

== Personal life ==
Valdés married María Francisca and they had two children: Francisco Antonio Cuervo and Ana María Cuervo.
