= El Cuartelejo =

Region in Colorado and Kansas, United States

- U.S. National Register of Historic Places
- U.S. National Historic Landmark District
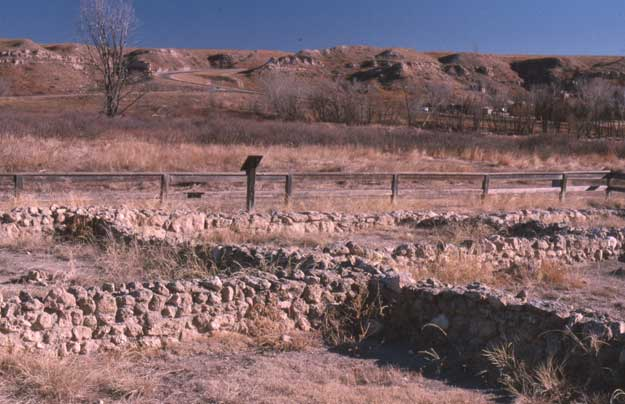
- El Cuartelejo Ruins, Lake Scott State Park, Kansas

- Location within Kansas Location within the United States
- Location: Western Kansas and eastern Colorado
- Coordinates: 38°40′41″N 100°54′51″W
- Built: Apache of the Dismal River culture occupation between 1450 and 1650; Pueblo people joined them between 1620 and 1680.
- NRHP reference No.: 66000351

Significant dates
- Added to NRHP: October 15, 1966
- Designated NHLD: July 19, 1964

El Cuartelejo is a region in eastern Colorado and western Kansas where Plains Apache lived with Pueblo people. The region was settled by Plains Apache, but after the 1680 Pueblo Revolt, Pueblo people, possibly Picuris, fled New Mexico north into Kansas by 1696, where they built a seven-room stone pueblo. Some people fled to the Arkansas River area of present-day Kiowa County, Colorado. Juan de Ulibarrí came to the Arkansas River area of Colorado in 1706 to capture and return Pueblo Native Americans who fled Nuevo Mexico in 1680.

In Kansas, an archeological district is the site of a Plains Apache and Pueblo village. It is the northernmost pueblo and the only known one in Kansas. Located in Lake Scott State Park, the remains of the stone and adobe pueblo are situated 13 miles north of Scott City, Kansas, in Ladder Creek Canyon.

On July 19, 1964, El Cuartelejo Archaeologist District (14SC1) was designated a National Historic Landmark. Of the 26 archaeological sites, most are from Apache of the Dismal River culture of precontact and post-contact periods from about 1450 until the mid-18th century. This group of Apache is called the Cuartelejo band.

== Name ==
El_Cuartelejo, also spelled El Quartelejo, comes from the Spanish cuartelejo, meaning old building or barracks, (Note: The settlement was named El Cuartelejo in the late 1600s by Spanish soldiers; cuartelejo means old building or barracks, with lejo meaning far away.) The main archaeological site is also called the Scott County Pueblo site (14SC1).

== Apache and Pueblo people ==
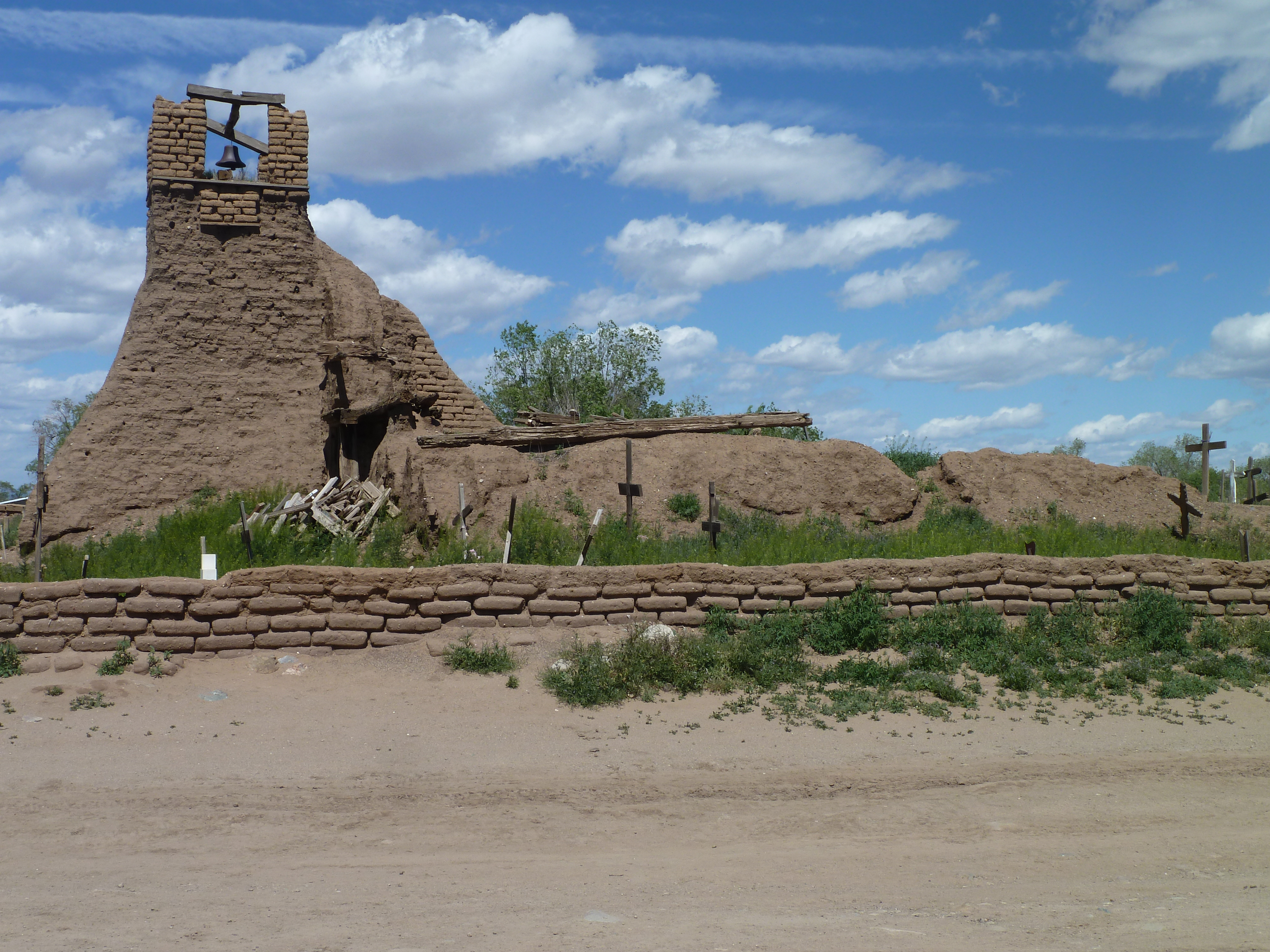
Old cemetery and ruins of old original church, Taos Pueblo, New Mexico. Fray Pedro de Miranda, the Taos mission priest, was killed in 1640.

The Dismal River people lived at the Kansas site from about 1450. The semisedentary western Apache people lived in small houses in El Cuartelejo in what is now eastern Colorado by 1640.

Silvestre Vélez de Escalante of the Domínguez–Escalante expedition wrote in 1778:

In the middle of the last century some families of Christian Indians of the nation and pueblo of Taos rebelled, withdrew to buffalo plains and fortified themselves at a place which afterwards on this account was called El Cuartelejo.

In the 17th century, Pueblo Native Americans revolted against Spanish priests and rulers of Nuevo México, who had instituted encomienda, which was a form of slavery. Spanish landholders were given people from the pueblo to work and live with them, during which they would cultivate crops or generate other products. In exchange, the landholder was responsible for their welfare, which included suppressing their spiritual practices. Indigenous spiritual leaders were enslaved, imprisoned, flogged, and killed by hanging. There were sporadic uprisings against the Spanish. Fray Pedro de Miranda, the Taos mission priest, was killed in 1640.

Throughout the 17th century, Pueblo people moved north from what is now New Mexico to live in the Great Plains of western Kansas and eastern Colorado with the Cuartelejo Apache, perhaps as early as 1620. People from the Taos Pueblo met up with the Cuartelejo Apache after the pueblo revolt of 1640 and in 1664, followed in 1696 by a group from the Picuris Pueblo as well as Tewa Pueblo people, mostly from Santa Clara Pueblo.

In 1642, Juan de Archuleta led a Spanish expedition to capture and return the Pueblo Native Americans to Nuevo Mexico. (Note: Some sources stated that Archuleta's expedition occurred before or after the Pueblo Revolt of 1680. It was also said that earlier sources stated this occurred in the 1660s.) Another expedition was led by Juan de Ulibarrí in 1706 to return another group of refugees back to Nuevo Mexico. There were at least five El Cuartelejo rancherias visited by Ulibarri's men. The main village was the site of the El Cuartelejo Ruins on Ladder Creek. Ulbarri called it Santa Domingo and made this his headquarters as people were rounded up by his men from other villages. Another location in Kansas was 20 miles northwest of present-day Scott City. There were three other locations.

The Villasur expedition of 1720 passed through El Cuartelejo with the objective of thwarting the control of the French within the Plains. They were defeated by the Pawnee in what is now Nebraska. French traders were at El Cuartelejo in 1727.

The Comanche, who rode on horseback, sought to control the Arkansas Valley of what is now eastern Colorado during the early 18th century. The Apache were pushed out of southeastern Colorado by the mid-1720s. In the meantime, French and allied Pawnee and Wichita people sought to control land to the east of the valley in Kansas. In response, Spanish troops fought against the threat by the Comanche, French, and allied Native Americans. The Cuartelejo Apache left the Kansas area by the 1730s. They were pushed south by the Pawnee, Comanche and Ute people. El Cuartelejo was abandoned and the Apache who survived the raids settled with the Jicarilla Apache at the Pecos Pueblo. The Comanche dominated the region by 1760. They controlled the trade networks of the Spanish in the southwest and the Pawnee and Wichita in the eastern plains.

== Pueblo and archaeological sites in Kansas ==
External images
- Reconstructed ruins of El Cuartelejo
- El Cuartelejo Historic Marker

The site is located in Ladder Creek Canyon, where there were natural springs and streams. Canyons and bluffs shielded the village from harsh weather and made for a milder microclimate. Stone in the area was used to make tools and construct buildings. The bottomland had rich soil for farming. The area also had bountiful wildlife. This site is unique in comparison to much of the High Plains of Kansas that are dry and flat.

The ruins are of a former Pueblo structure. The former seven-room structure of 16 by 11 metres (52 ft × 36 ft) was likely built by the Taos or Picuris Pueblo before 1680. It is similar to structures of pueblos of the southwest, with grinding trough, ovens, and slab-lines hearths. It also had raised platforms for sitting or sleeping. The building, made of plastered stone walls, had a roof constructed of willow poles and plastered brush. People entered the building by climbing a ladder and entering from the top; there were no doors or windows. The structure is believed to be the northernmost pueblo built in North America.

Along with the pueblo, there were 25 other related archaeological sites. Artifacts were generally those of the Plains Apache of the Dismal River culture, but there are also artifacts and pueblo structures from the southwestern pueblo cultures. Irrigation ditches from a nearby spring were used to water their crops.

=== Herbert and Eliza Steele ===
In 1888, Herbert Steele and his wife Eliza homesteaded in western Kansas. They lived in a dugout until their sandstone house was completed. On the land previously inhabited by Apache and Pueblo, they found Native American stone and other artifacts on the site and wondered about the mounds of dirt on the land. They contacted archaeologists about the site, which led to excavations at the turn of the century.

In 1922, two acres of the Steeles' land that included the pueblo ruins was given to the Kansas Society of the Daughters of the American Revolution (DAR) so that it could be appreciated by the public. The DAR erected a monument in 1925. The Steele's house is used as a museum for the Lake Scott State Park.

=== Excavations ===
External image
- Old and newer excavation photos

From 1898 to 1900, the site was excavated by archaeologists S. W. Williston and H.T. Martin from the University of Kansas. They found that Apache of the Dismal River culture inhabited the site before and after the cohabitation with the Pueblo. They uncovered walls of the pueblo and within the rooms they found animal bones, lithics, ceramics, and a large quantity of corn. The pueblo architecture is of southwestern origin. Pottery were in the styles of both Northern Rio Grande Pueblo and Plains Native Americans. Based upon the presence of charcoal and burnt artifacts within the charred adobe, Williston and Martin believed that it was destroyed by fire.

The Smithsonian Institution excavation of 1939, led by Waldo Wedel, which focused south and north of the pueblo (site code 14SC1). A few meters from the pueblo, a circular bell-shaped pit and a cache pit were found that contained hundreds of stone tools and about 4,000 Dismal River ceramic fragments. There were pipe fragments similar to the ones from the northern Rio Grande pueblos. Charcoal, numerous animal bones, three Olivella shells, and other discarded items were also found there. According to the artifacts, the Nuevo Mexican women continued to make pottery and cook as they had in their homeland.

Nebraska Historical Society conducted excavations in 1970, 1975, and 1976, led by A. T. Hill. They found a roasting pit below the pueblo, which meant that people of the Dismal River culture lived there before they cohabitated with the Pueblo. Artifacts included items from the Dismal River culture, Tewa Polychrome pottery from the southwest, and clay pipes. Archaeologists from the University of Oklahoma and University of Iowa have led excavations since the 1970s, which helped date the occupations.

=== Reconstruction ===
Starting with the initial excavation, the archaeological sites have degraded, with damage to the pueblo ruins and removal of artifacts by amateur archaeologists. After the 1970s excavations, partial walls of the pueblo were reconstructed to show the layout of the pueblo as it appeared in 1898.

=== Historic landmark and park ===
In 1964, the El Cuartelejo Archaeological District was made a National Historic Landmark, which protects its resources and resulted in a reconstruction of the walls. Interpretive historic markers were added to the site. The ruins are within Lake Scott State Park, and are owned by the Kansas State Society of the Daughters of the American Revolution. The site is maintained by the Kansas Department of Wildlife, Parks and Tourism.

A model of the pueblo, early Native American camp scenes, as well as artifacts and fossils from El Cuartelejo are on display at the El Quartelejo Museum.

== Colorado ==
Some of the Nuevo Mexico refugees lived with Apache in what is now eastern Colorado at the Arkansas and Purgatoire Rivers, near the site of 19th-century Bent's Fort. Other bands of Apache lived north along the Smoky Hill and Republican Rivers of eastern Colorado. Pottery from related archaeological sites were of the Padouca Apache and other Apache bands, as well as some Pueblo pottery. The Apache lived in the rancherias, with huts or houses around a central plaza. They lived there except when they hunted buffalo in northeastern Colorado.

A group of people from the Taos Pueblo moved to El Cuartelejo rancherías north of the Arkansas River by 1640, there were already Pueblo refugees living with the Apache. By 1710, Comanche and Utes attacked Apache rancherias. In 1726, Padoucas from Kansas led French traders west to El Cuartelejo, closer to their goal of Nuevo Mexico, where they hoped to establish trade with the Spanish.

From 1710 to 1735, the Comanche attacked Apache rancherias. The Palomas Apache joined the Cuartelejo Apache at El Cuarto in the Las Animas district along the Arkansas River. The Comanche attacked from the west and drove the bands of Apache, including the Carlanas (Note: Carlana Apache, also a Dismal River culture, probably lived in southeastern Colorado. Both the Jicarilla and Carlana Apache were in contact with the Cuartelejo Apache. The Paloma lived on the most remote borderlands of the Apache.) and Chilpaines, out of the region. The El Cuartelejo settlements were abandoned, and they established rancherías near the Pecos Pueblo in Nuevo México. Some Apache moved to the plains east of Nuevo México.

French men occupied the El Cuartelejo rancherias in 1748 where they established trading posts and traded with the Comanche.

== See also ==
- Étienne de Veniard, Sieur de Bourgmont
- Jean L'Archevêque
- José Naranjo (scout)

== Sources ==
- Hyde, George E. (1988). The Pawnee Indians. University of Oklahoma Press. ISBN 978-0-8061-2094-2.
- Gunnerson, James H. (1988). Ethnohistory of the High Plains. Colorado State Office, Bureau of Land Management.
- Gunnerson, James H. (1989). Archeology of the High Plains. Rocky Mountain Region, USDA Forest Service.
