= List of United States tornadoes from April to May 2016 =

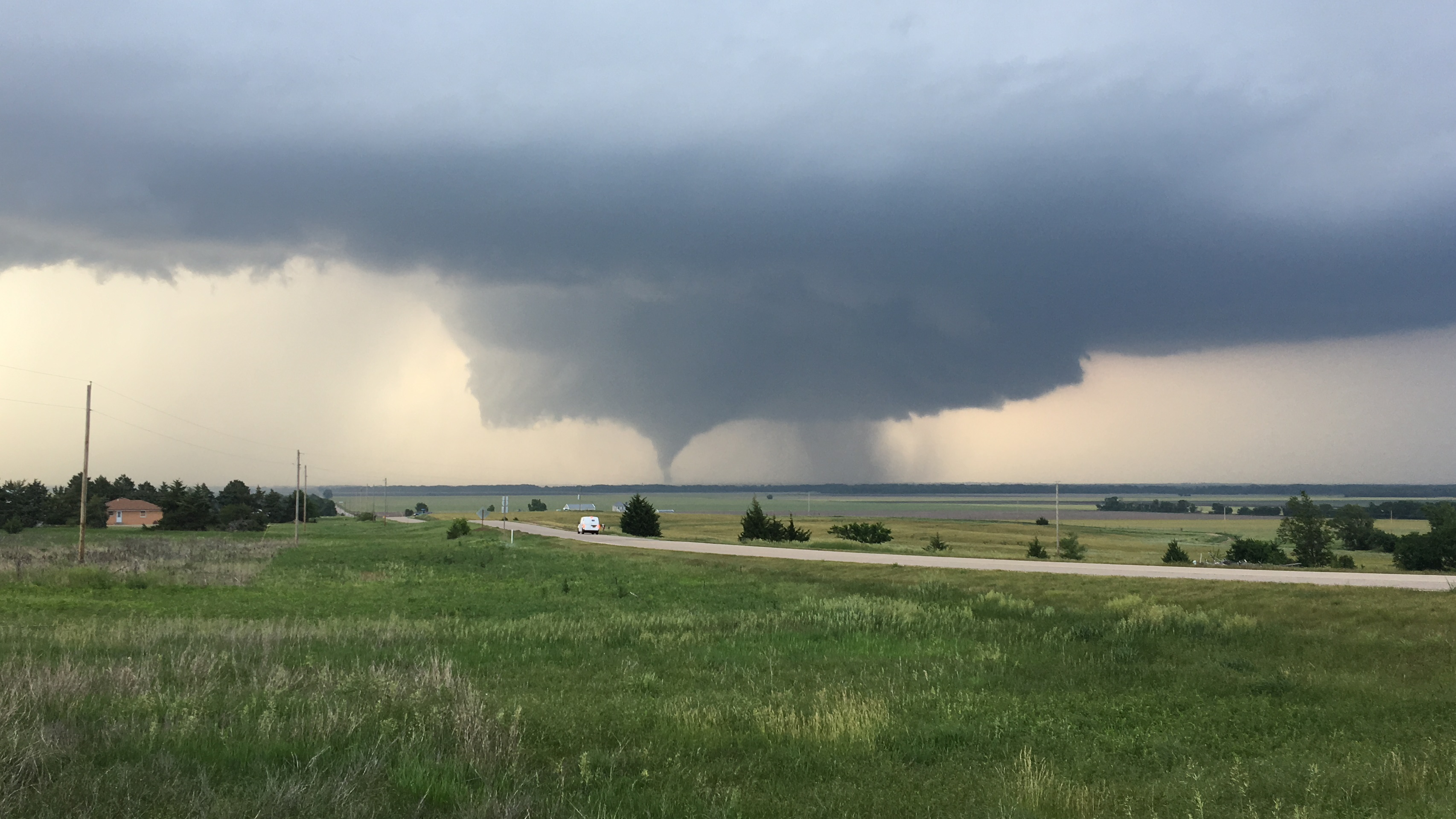
The May 25, 2016 EF4 Abilene–Chapman, Kansas tornado shortly after formation.

This is a list of all tornadoes that were confirmed by local offices of the National Weather Service in the United States in April and May 2016.

== United States yearly total ==
Confirmed tornadoes by Enhanced Fujita rating
EFU	EF0	EF1	EF2	EF3	EF4	EF5	Total
30	530	311	75	26	2	0	974

== April ==
Confirmed tornadoes by Enhanced Fujita rating
EFU	EF0	EF1	EF2	EF3	EF4	EF5	Total
4	80	52	6	0	0	0	142

=== April 1 event ===
List of confirmed tornadoes – Friday, April 1, 2016 (Note: All dates are based on the local time zone where the tornado touched down; however, all times are in Coordinated Universal Time for consistency.)
EF#	Location	County / Parish	State	Start Coord.	Time (UTC)	Path length	Max width	Damage (2016 USD)
EF0	Beauregard	Lee	AL	32.5338°N 85.3794°W	0519–0523	2.09 mi (3.36 km)	50 yd (46 m)	$0
EF0	Several trees were uprooted and shingles were ripped off. Several homes also sustained roof awning damage.							
EF0	NNE of Reynolds	Taylor, Crawford	GA	32.5950°N 84.0926°W	1103–1106	1.35 mi (2.17 km)	300 yd (270 m)	$15,000
EF0	A brief tornado destroyed a small shed and snapped or uprooted a few trees.							
EF1	NE of Centerville to Robins Air Force Base	Houston	GA	32.6231°N 83.6776°W	1142–1152	4.86 mi (7.82 km)	350 yd (320 m)	$250,000
EF1	Large parts of a metal roof were stripped from a hangar at Robins Air Force Base, and numerous trees were downed, some of which landed on homes.							
EF0	ENE of Bullard	Twiggs	GA	32.6385°N 83.479°W	1206–1207	0.61 mi (0.98 km)	60 yd (55 m)	$10,000
EF0	Weak tornado snapped several trees.							
EF1	SW of Allentown to Southern Allentown	Twiggs, Wilkinson	GA	32.573°N 83.259°W	1250–1255	2.3 mi (3.7 km)	300 yd (270 m)	$120,000
EF1	Two double-wide mobile homes were damaged, one significantly, which had most of the roof uplifted and the exterior wall collapsed. Two storage trailers had significant damage, and trees were downed along the path.							
EF1	SSW of Pearson to WNW of Cogdell	Clinch, Atkinson	GA	31.17°N 82.91°W	2115–2135	7.81 mi (12.57 km)	1,232 yd (1,127 m)	$0
EF1	One older home was heavily damaged, with most of the roof removed, and many trees were blown down in two areas. One indirect injury occurred to a person who was cleaning their roof after the storm.							
EF1	SSE of Millwood	Ware	GA	31.24°N 82.66°W	2135–2144	2.46 mi (3.96 km)	880 yd (800 m)	Unknown
EF1	Several small farm structures were thrown, an older travel trailer was rolled and destroyed, and another trailer had its roof lifted off. In addition, trees were downed along the path and other minor damage occurred. Several horses were trapped by fallen trees and two dogs were missing after the storm.							

=== April 6 event ===
List of confirmed tornadoes – Wednesday, April 6, 2016
EF#	Location	County / Parish	State	Start Coord.	Time (UTC)	Path length	Max width	Damage (2016 USD)
EF0	SSE of Montgomery to W of Pike Road	Montgomery	AL	32.296°N 86.2387°W	0355–0404	6.01 mi (9.67 km)	250 yd (230 m)	$0
EF0	Numerous large trees were snapped and uprooted, some of which damaged or destroyed mobile homes.							
EF0	WSW of Hardaway	Bullock	AL	32.2579°N 85.9388°W	0418–0423	3.03 mi (4.88 km)	300 yd (270 m)	$0
EF0	Several trees were snapped and uprooted.							
EF0	SW of Fitzpatrick	Montgomery	AL	32.1341°N 86.0133°W	0424–0426	0.77 mi (1.24 km)	50 yd (46 m)	$0
EF0	Brief tornado snapped several trees.							
EF0	SSW of Auburn	Lee	AL	32.5347°N 85.5247°W	0432–0433	0.72 mi (1.16 km)	250 yd (230 m)	$0
EF0	Two trampolines were lofted downstream, and several trees were snapped and uprooted.							
EF0	SE of Auburn to ESE of Beauregard	Lee	AL	32.5400°N 85.4183°W	0444–0450	4.71 mi (7.58 km)	200 yd (180 m)	$0
EF0	A few pieces of metal sheeting removed from an outbuilding, and several trees were snapped and uprooted.							
EF2	N of Midway	Bullock	AL	32.1271°N 85.5662°W	0454–0506	7.74 mi (12.46 km)	250 yd (230 m)	$0
EF2	A church was heavily damaged, including wall and roof failures to over half of the building, and some large metal farm equipment buildings were heavily damaged or destroyed.							
EF1	SW of Crawford to SSW of Ladonia	Russell	AL	32.4187°N 85.2417°W	0457–0505	7.49 mi (12.05 km)	200 yd (180 m)	$0
EF1	Numerous large hardwood trees with large root balls uprooted.							

=== April 7 event ===
List of confirmed tornadoes – Thursday, April 7, 2016
EF#	Location	County / Parish	State	Start Coord.	Time (UTC)	Path length	Max width	Damage (2016 USD)
EF0	W of Clayton to N of Louisville	Barbour	AL	31.8815°N 85.6408°W	0516–0527	5.37 mi (8.64 km)	200 yd (180 m)	$0
EF0	Numerous trees were snapped and uprooted along the path.							
EF0	SW of Glenville	Russell	AL	32.0982°N 85.2216°W	0522–0525	1.32 mi (2.12 km)	75 yd (69 m)	$0
EF0	A brief tornado flipped a pivot irrigation system and snapped and uprooted numerous pine trees, completely blocking a roadway.							
EF0	WNW of Lumpkin	Stewart	GA	32.0639°N 84.9134°W	0555–0557	0.16 mi (0.26 km)	50 yd (46 m)	$20,000
EF0	Numerous trees were snapped and uprooted along a brief, narrow path in Providence Canyon State Park.							
EF0	NE of Weston	Webster	GA	31.9895°N 84.5977°W	0627–0637	5.09 mi (8.19 km)	300 yd (270 m)	$30,000
EF0	Numerous trees were snapped and uprooted.							
EF2	N of Bellville to NW of Morgan	Randolph, Clay, Calhoun	GA	31.6221°N 84.8895°W	0640–0705	15.8 mi (25.4 km)	250 yd (230 m)	$150,000
EF2	Two single wide mobile homes were destroyed. A single family residence was damaged, with a portion of the exterior brick wall collapsed, large sections of the roof removed, and debris blown 100–200 yards (91–183 m) from the structure. A double-wide mobile home had some sections of walls and roof removed, and it was blown off its foundation by a couple feet. Another double-wide mobile home was obliterated with debris blown across the road about 50 yards or more into a tree line. A house was damaged, with a small portion of the roof removed. The residents stated that the roof had separated from the walls, but set down again in a slightly different position. Five people were injured.							
EF0	NNE of Port Richey	Pasco	FL	28.2994°N 82.67°W	0951–0957	3.08 mi (4.96 km)	50 yd (46 m)	$100,000
EF0	At least 25 structures sustained damage, mostly to pool cages, roofs, garages and carports. Numerous tree limbs were snapped and a few trees were uprooted, and a few business signs were damaged or destroyed as well.							
EF0	NW of Clearwater	Pinellas	FL	27.9977°N 82.8285°W	1037–1038	0.13 mi (0.21 km)	50 yd (46 m)	$5,000
EF0	Trees and power lines were knocked down.							
EF0	ENE of Clearwater	Pinellas	FL	27.9723°N 82.7178°W	1055–1059	0.79 mi (1.27 km)	50 yd (46 m)	$100,000
EF0	Trees and power lines were knocked down.							

=== April 11 event ===
List of confirmed tornadoes – Monday, April 11, 2016
EF#	Location	County / Parish	State	Start Coord.	Time (UTC)	Path length	Max width	Damage (2016 USD)
EF0	ESE of Magnolia	Columbia	AR	33.2500°N 93.0941°W	1826–1828	1.18 mi (1.90 km)	25 yd (23 m)	$25,000
EF0	Brief tornado damaged several trees.							

=== April 15 event ===
List of confirmed tornadoes – Friday, April 15, 2016
EF#	Location	County / Parish	State	Start Coord.	Time (UTC)	Path length	Max width	Damage (2016 USD)
EFU	SSW of Eads	Kiowa	CO	38.3743°N 102.8185°W	2008–2038	3.85 mi (6.20 km)	150 yd (140 m)	$0
EFU	Tornado remained over open country, causing no damage.							
EFU	SSW of Eads	Kiowa	CO	38.4046°N 102.8083°W	2026–2028	0.5 mi (0.80 km)	100 yd (91 m)	$0
EFU	A brief tornado touched down over a field.							
EFU	W of Eads	Kiowa	CO	38.4773°N 102.7234°W	2105–2110	1.2 mi (1.9 km)	100 yd (91 m)	$0
EFU	A brief tornado touched down over a field.							
EFU	WNW of Wiley	Bent	CO	38.1773°N 102.7907°W	0010–0013	0.59 mi (0.95 km)	100 yd (91 m)	$0
EFU	A brief tornado touched down over a field.							
EF0	SW of Eva	Texas	OK	36.74°N 101.988°W	0050–0051	1.07 mi (1.72 km)	50 yd (46 m)	$0
EF0	Emergency managers and storm chasers reported a brief tornado.							
EF1	SW of Eva	Texas	OK	36.7467°N 101.9433°W	0056–0059	1.07 mi (1.72 km)	60 yd (55 m)	$0
EF1	Two outbuildings and a silo were destroyed and power pole was snapped in a farm complex.							
EF0	W of Eva	Texas	OK	36.7962°N 101.9512°W	0102–0104	0.91 mi (1.46 km)	50 yd (46 m)	$0
EF0	A tornado caused minimal damage in a farm complex, where a metal roof was peeled back, a power pole was broken, and a tractor trailer was rolled onto its side.							
EF0	NNE of Eva	Texas	OK	36.8669°N 101.8654°W	0116–0120	1 mi (1.6 km)	50 yd (46 m)	$0
EF0	Storm chasers and trained storm spotters reported a tornado.							
EF0	NNE of Eva	Texas	OK	36.88°N 101.86°W	0119–0121	0.78 mi (1.26 km)	25 yd (23 m)	$0
EF0	A trained storm spotter reported a tornado over open grasslands.							
EF1	ENE of Elkhart to SW of Wilburton	Morton	KS	37.0174°N 101.8563°W	0130–0137	1.8 mi (2.9 km)	125 yd (114 m)	$80,000
EF1	A pivot irrigation sprinkler and some power poles were destroyed and an outbuilding sustained light damage.							
EF0	NW of Rolla to ESE of Richfield	Morton	KS	37.1758°N 101.7153°W	0152–0158	3.5 mi (5.6 km)	400 yd (370 m)	$0
EF0	A storm chaser documented a tornado which tracked over open grassland, causing no damage.							
EF0	N of Adrian	Oldham	TX	35.5621°N 102.625°W	0250–0251	0.8 mi (1.3 km)	50 yd (46 m)	$0
EF0	Storm chasers reported a brief tornado over rural lands.							

=== April 16 event ===
List of confirmed tornadoes – Saturday, April 16, 2016
EF#	Location	County / Parish	State	Start Coord.	Time (UTC)	Path length	Max width	Damage (2016 USD)
EF0	SW of Girard	Kent	TX	33.2781°N 100.7754°W	2155–2156	0.11 mi (0.18 km)	40 yd (37 m)	$0
EF0	Storm chasers reported a brief tornado over open land.							
EF0	W of Loraine	Mitchell	TX	32.42°N 100.7714°W	2158–2200	0.92 mi (1.48 km)	250 yd (230 m)	$0
EF0	A trained storm spotter reported a brief tornado over open land.							
EF0	ESE of Dickens	Dickens	TX	33.58°N 100.62°W	2250–2253	0.75 mi (1.21 km)	150 yd (140 m)	$0
EF0	A large cone tornado was videotaped over open land.							
EF0	S of Dumont	Dickens	TX	33.66°N 100.54°W	2305–2306	0.01 mi (0.016 km)	50 yd (46 m)	$0
EF0	A brief tornado was videotaped over open land.							
EF0	N of Sweetwater	Fisher	TX	32.6256°N 100.4174°W	2324–2329	1.23 mi (1.98 km)	50 yd (46 m)	$0
EF0	A storm chaser observed a tornado over open lands.							
EF0	SW of Hermleigh	Scurry	TX	32.5993°N 100.7865°W	0050–0052	0.91 mi (1.46 km)	300 yd (270 m)	$0
EF0	A tornado touched down and caused no damage.							

=== April 17 event ===
List of confirmed tornadoes – Sunday, April 17, 2016
EF#	Location	County / Parish	State	Start Coord.	Time (UTC)	Path length	Max width	Damage (2016 USD)
EF0	Spring	Harris	TX	30.061°N 95.4782°W	1710–1712	0.47 mi (0.76 km)	30 yd (27 m)	$30,000
EF0	Klein Collins High School sustained minor damage.							
EF0	S of Los Angeles	La Salle	TX	28.29°N 99°W	0024–0025	0.02 mi (0.032 km)	20 yd (18 m)	$0
EF0	Trained storm spotters reported a brief, rain-wrapped tornado.							

=== April 18 event ===
List of confirmed tornadoes – Monday, April 18, 2016
EF#	Location	County / Parish	State	Start Coord.	Time (UTC)	Path length	Max width	Damage (2016 USD)
EF0	NE of Houston	Harris	TX	29.9212°N 95.1611°W	1012–1014	0.23 mi (0.37 km)	30 yd (27 m)	$30,000
EF0	Trees and fences were downed. A home sustained minor roof damage.							
EF0	NW of Huffman	Harris	TX	30.0452°N 95.1169°W	1014–1016	0.14 mi (0.23 km)	30 yd (27 m)	$10,000
EF0	A few trees were uprooted; many branches were downed.							

=== April 19 event ===
List of confirmed tornadoes – Tuesday, April 19, 2016
EF#	Location	County / Parish	State	Start Coord.	Time (UTC)	Path length	Max width	Damage (2016 USD)
EF0	SE of Fort Stockton	Pecos	TX	30.5879°N 102.7235°W	2153–2203	6.54 mi (10.53 km)	400 yd (370 m)	$0
EF0	Tornado remained over open fields, causing no damage.							
EF0	N of Laddonia	Audrain	MO	39.27°N 91.6658°W	2318–2323	2.01 mi (3.23 km)	15 yd (14 m)	$0
EF0	A landspout tornado caused roof damage to a machine shed.							

=== April 22 event ===
List of confirmed tornadoes – Friday, April 22, 2016
EF#	Location	County / Parish	State	Start Coord.	Time (UTC)	Path length	Max width	Damage (2016 USD)
EF0	WSW of Greenfield	Monterey	CA	36.3011°N 121.313°W	0000–0001	0.24 mi (0.39 km)	15 yd (14 m)	Unknown
EF0	Two steel dumpsters were tossed about 30 yd (27 m). Approximately half of the roof to a pole barn was ripped off and scattered. A large tree downed, and several large branches were thrown.							

=== April 24 event ===
List of confirmed tornadoes – Sunday, April 24, 2016
EF#	Location	County / Parish	State	Start Coord.	Time (UTC)	Path length	Max width	Damage (2016 USD)
EF0	NW of Holyrood	Ellsworth	KS	38.62°N 98.45°W	2112–2115	3.5 mi (5.6 km)	50 yd (46 m)	$0
EF0	Brief touchdown occurred over open country.							
EF0	S of Glendale	Saline	KS	38.84°N 97.87°W	2219–2222	2.93 mi (4.72 km)	50 yd (46 m)	$0
EF0	Brief touchdown occurred over open country.							
EF1	NW of Superior	Nuckolls	NE	40.0952°N 98.18°W	2303–2310	2.43 mi (3.91 km)	300 yd (270 m)	$4,000
EF1	Slow-moving tornado remained over rural areas along a curved path, damaging four power poles and fencing and downing trees along the path.							
EF0	Southern League City	Galveston	TX	29.4714°N 95.1001°W	2329–2336	1.44 mi (2.32 km)	30 yd (27 m)	$100,000
EF0	A Candlewood Suites hotel sustained roof damage and had its door blown in, vehicles were damaged, and a storage shed was thrown about 300 yd (270 m). Numerous fences were knocked down, loose objects were knocked over, and tree damage occurred, with one tree uprooted.							
EF1	NNW of Belleville to S of Narka	Republic	KS	39.8628°N 97.6327°W	2350–0015	12.25 mi (19.71 km)	150 yd (140 m)	$0
EF1	A mobile home was destroyed and several houses were damaged. A farmstead was damaged. Two people were injured.							

=== April 25 event ===
List of confirmed tornadoes – Monday, April 25, 2016
EF#	Location	County / Parish	State	Start Coord.	Time (UTC)	Path length	Max width	Damage (2016 USD)
EF0	WSW of Lucerne	Weld	CO	40.46°N 104.74°W	2102	0.01 mi (0.016 km)	50 yd (46 m)	$0
EF0	A trained storm spotter reported a brief landspout tornado.							

=== April 26 event ===
List of confirmed tornadoes – Tuesday, April 26, 2016
EF#	Location	County / Parish	State	Start Coord.	Time (UTC)	Path length	Max width	Damage (2016 USD)
EF1	ENE of Berger to W of Hopewell	Warren	MO	38.6947°N 91.2761°W	1752–1802	5.46 mi (8.79 km)	100 yd (91 m)	$0
EF1	This tornado caused tree damage across parts of southwestern Warren County. The most significant damage occurred to about 100 trees that were snapped and twisted.							
EF0	WSW of New Melle	St. Charles	MO	38.6822°N 90.9558°W	1824–1825	0.32 mi (0.51 km)	50 yd (46 m)	$0
EF0	The tops were blown out of trees, and metal was torn off an outbuilding and blown about 200 yards (180 m) away. This brief tornado occurred on the northern side of a much larger area of straight-line wind damage.							
EF0	ESE of Junction City	Geary	KS	38.984°N 96.5904°W	2047	0.01 mi (0.016 km)	10 yd (9.1 m)	$0
EF0	A storm chaser reported a brief tornado touchdown in an open field.							
EF0	WSW of Mayfield	Sumner	KS	37.24°N 97.61°W	2058–2059	1.06 mi (1.71 km)	50 yd (46 m)	$0
EF0	Brief touchdown occurred over open country.							
EF1	Evansville	Vanderburgh	IN	38.035°N 87.6411°W	2238–2248	7.47 mi (12.02 km)	250 yd (230 m)	$250,000
EF1	A tornado damaged at least eight buildings and uprooted or snapped dozens of trees. One building had part of its metal roofing peeled up.							
EF0	NE of Silver Lake	Shawnee	KS	39.1307°N 95.8304°W	2242	0.01 mi (0.016 km)	20 yd (18 m)	$0
EF0	A storm chaser reported a brief tornado touchdown.							
EF0	NNW of Stamford	Haskell	TX	33.0303°N 99.8271°W	2247–2250	1.47 mi (2.37 km)	25 yd (23 m)	$0
EF0	A storm chaser photographed a tornado touchdown.							
EF0	SW of Worthington	Greene	IN	39.0854°N 87.0299°W	2320–2321	0.08 mi (0.13 km)	75 yd (69 m)	$15,000
EF0	A tornado damaged several barns and launched a piece of debris from a barn 250 feet (76 m).							
EF0	N of Kensington	Smith	KS	39.9122°N 99.0499°W	0047–0049	0.3 mi (0.48 km)	100 yd (91 m)	$0
EF0	Brief tornado remained over the same general area for a few minutes, causing no damage.							
EF0	NE of Mustang to Southwestern Oklahoma City	Canadian, Oklahoma	OK	35.407°N 97.707°W	0108–0112	4.1 mi (6.6 km)	50 yd (46 m)	$12,000
EF0	Power lines, outbuildings and trees were damaged. The tornado was embedded in a large swath of thunderstorm wind damage.							
EF1	NW of Jones to NNW of Luther	Oklahoma	OK	35.606°N 97.336°W	0143–0153	10 mi (16 km)	150 yd (140 m)	$10,000
EF1	A tornado caused scattered damage in parts of northeast Oklahoma City and Luther. The most significant damage occurred north-northwest of Luther, where a home had a large part of its roof removed. The tornado was embedded in a large area of thunderstorm wind damage and the path may not have been continuous.							
EF0	N of Arcadia to SSW of Meridian	Oklahoma, Logan	OK	35.71°N 97.33°W	0149–0153	3.66 mi (5.89 km)	100 yd (91 m)	$4,000
EF0	A barn and a swath of trees were damaged.							
EF0	Whitesboro	Grayson	TX	33.6567°N 96.8964°W	0222–0223	0.23 mi (0.37 km)	80 yd (73 m)	$200,000
EF0	A portion of the roof was blown off of a house and thrown into a nearby business. 15 homes in town were damaged by this tornado.							
EF1	NNE of Blackburn	Osage	OK	36.4540°N 96.5556°W	0244–0249	3.8 mi (6.1 km)	450 yd (410 m)	$0
EF1	Trees were snapped or uprooted.							
EF1	NNW of Byng	Pontotoc	OK	34.905°N 96.693°W	0250–0252	2 mi (3.2 km)	200 yd (180 m)	$20,000
EF1	A barn, a metal building and numerous trees were damaged, and a residence was significantly damaged.							
EF1	W of Wynona	Osage	OK	36.5072°N 96.4493°W	0252–0300	6.9 mi (11.1 km)	900 yd (820 m)	$15,000
EF1	Outbuildings and a mobile home were damaged and trees were snapped and uprooted.							
EF1	NW of Kellyville to WNW of Sapulpa	Creek	OK	35.9751°N 96.2571°W	0300–0305	5.6 mi (9.0 km)	550 yd (500 m)	$20,000
EF1	A church and several homes were damaged and trees were snapped or uprooted.							
EF1	Northern Howe	Grayson	TX	33.5257°N 96.6174°W	0300–0308	2.42 mi (3.89 km)	150 yd (140 m)	$450,000
EF1	This tornado produced heavy damage to several homes, including two which had most of the roof blown off. The homes along and near Stark Lane were the hardest hit where several power lines and power poles were damaged or destroyed. Five people were injured.							
EF1	SSE of Westport to SE of Prue	Pawnee, Osage	OK	36.1765°N 96.3296°W	0300–0308	7 mi (11 km)	800 yd (730 m)	$150,000
EF1	At least two homes were damaged, two boat docks were destroyed, and numerous trees were snapped or uprooted.							
EF0	ENE of Luella to NNE of Bells	Grayson	TX	33.5998°N 96.4916°W	0311–0317	6.01 mi (9.67 km)	75 yd (69 m)	$80,000
EF0	Recreational vehicle businesses and trees were damaged.							
EF1	Southern Tulsa	Tulsa	OK	36.0926°N 96.0060°W	0318–0325	3.8 mi (6.1 km)	600 yd (550 m)	$150,000
EF1	A church and some homes were damaged, trees were snapped or uprooted, and power poles were blown down.							
EF1	Bixby	Tulsa	OK	35.9412°N 95.8952°W	0326–0330	2.7 mi (4.3 km)	350 yd (320 m)	$100,000
EF1	This tornado damaged industrial buildings and the roofs of homes, and blew down trees and power lines.							
EF1	SSE of Broken Arrow	Tulsa, Wagoner	OK	35.9792°N 95.7744°W	0336–0339	1 mi (1.6 km)	150 yd (140 m)	$10,000
EF1	This tornado damaged the roofs of homes, snapped and uprooted numerous trees, and blew down power poles.							
EF1	Checotah	McIntosh	OK	35.4680°N 95.5312°W	0411–0419	7.5 mi (12.1 km)	400 yd (370 m)	$100,000
EF1	Numerous homes and businesses sustained roof damage in Checotah, and outbuildings were also damaged. Numerous trees were snapped or uprooted and power poles were blown down as well.							
EF0	WNW of Vinita to SW of Bluejacket	Craig	OK	36.6924°N 95.2991°W	0416–0426	10.1 mi (16.3 km)	500 yd (460 m)	$20,000
EF0	A few trees were uprooted, numerous large tree limbs were snapped, and outbuildings were damaged.							
EF1	SSE of Braggs	Muskogee	OK	35.6102°N 95.2131°W	0434–0439	5.1 mi (8.2 km)	800 yd (730 m)	$50,000
EF1	Numerous trees were snapped or uprooted and buildings were damaged in Greenleaf State Park, and power poles were snapped.							
EF0	S of Strang to Spavinaw	Mayes	OK	36.3815°N 95.1287°W	0435–0441	4.7 mi (7.6 km)	750 yd (690 m)	$20,000
EF0	A few trees were uprooted, numerous large tree limbs were snapped, and outbuildings were damaged.							
EF1	WNW of Cookson	Cherokee	OK	35.6913°N 95.0443°W	0446–0455	7.2 mi (11.6 km)	700 yd (640 m)	$150,000
EF1	Outbuildings and a boat dock on Lake Tenkiller were destroyed, homes were damaged, and numerous trees were snapped or uprooted.							
EF1	Twin Oaks to Colcord	Delaware	OK	36.2027°N 94.8572°W	0458–0509	10.1 mi (16.3 km)	850 yd (780 m)	$100,000
EF1	This tornado destroyed outbuildings, damaged the roofs of homes, snapped or uprooted trees, and blew down power poles.							

=== April 27 event ===
List of confirmed tornadoes – Wednesday, April 27, 2016
EF#	Location	County / Parish	State	Start Coord.	Time (UTC)	Path length	Max width	Damage (2016 USD)
EF1	SE of Nashoba	Pushmataha	OK	34.3850°N 95.0718°W	0503–0505	1.5 mi (2.4 km)	500 yd (460 m)	$125,000
EF1	A chicken house and an outbuilding were destroyed and trees were snapped and uprooted.							
EF1	NE of Wyandotte	Ottawa	OK	36.8481°N 94.6522°W	0507–0510	1.6 mi (2.6 km)	350 yd (320 m)	$150,000
EF1	A home was damaged and farm equipment and outbuildings were destroyed. Power poles were blown down and numerous trees were snapped or uprooted as well.							
EF1	N of Seneca	Newton	MO	36.8628°N 94.6139°W	0521–0522	0.82 mi (1.32 km)	150 yd (140 m)	$50,000
EF1	A tornado caused minor structural damage to a church and uprooted numerous trees.							
EF1	S of Muldrow	Sequoyah	OK	35.3684°N 94.6262°W	0523–0529	4.3 mi (6.9 km)	500 yd (460 m)	$25,000
EF1	Several homes had their roofs damaged and numerous trees were snapped or uprooted.							
EF1	NE of Decatur to Centerton	Benton	AR	36.3425°N 94.4462°W	0529–0538	9.1 mi (14.6 km)	600 yd (550 m)	$50,000
EF1	This tornado snapped and uprooted numerous trees, blew down power poles, destroyed outbuildings, and damaged homes.							
EF1	NNE of Centerton	Benton	AR	36.3805°N 94.2817°W	0541–0543	2 mi (3.2 km)	350 yd (320 m)	$30,000
EF1	This tornado uprooted a few trees, snapped large tree limbs, and damaged the roofs of homes.							
EF1	Kibler	Crawford	AR	35.4087°N 94.2595°W	0553–0557	2.4 mi (3.9 km)	300 yd (270 m)	$50,000
EF1	Homes and chicken houses were damaged and numerous trees were uprooted.							
EF1	N of Charleston	Franklin	AR	35.3185°N 94.0778°W	0606–0610	3.2 mi (5.1 km)	500 yd (460 m)	$10,000
EF1	Trees were uprooted and power poles were blown down.							
EF1	NNW of Wesley	Madison	AR	36.0246°N 93.9386°W	0612–0621	6.2 mi (10.0 km)	500 yd (460 m)	$250,000
EF1	This tornado destroyed several outbuildings, damaged homes, snapped and uprooted numerous trees, blew down power poles.							
EF0	WNW of Ozark	Franklin	AR	35.4862°N 93.9555°W	0618–0624	5.9 mi (9.5 km)	700 yd (640 m)	$100,000
EF0	Several homes and some chicken houses were damaged, an outbuilding was destroyed, and numerous large tree limbs were snapped.							
EF0	NE of Battlefield	Greene	MO	37.1345°N 93.3621°W	0649–0650	0.23 mi (0.37 km)	40 yd (37 m)	$100,000
EF0	A few homes sustained damage to their roofs, gutters, and awnings.							
EF0	E of Tomball	Harris	TX	30.0982°N 95.5511°W	0943–0947	0.41 mi (0.66 km)	40 yd (37 m)	$200,000
EF0	1 death – Numerous large pine trees were uprooted, several of which fell onto homes. An elderly woman was killed when a large tree fell on her mobile home.							
EF1	Southeastern Woodville	Tyler	TX	30.7679°N 94.4145°W	1058–1100	0.69 mi (1.11 km)	50 yd (46 m)	$10,000
EF1	Some roofing material was removed from a building and numerous trees were uprooted and snapped.							
EF1	NW of Kirbyville	Jasper	TX	30.7403°N 94.0229°W	1122–1127	2.22 mi (3.57 km)	50 yd (46 m)	$7,000
EF1	A home was damaged when a tree fell on it, a small farm building sustained damage to roof panels, and other trees were snapped, uprooted, or had large branches broken off.							
EF0	W of Cedar Bluffs	Saunders	NE	41.3889°N 96.6872°W	1910–1911	0.18 mi (0.29 km)	25 yd (23 m)	$0
EF0	Emergency managers photographed a brief tornado.							
EF1	E of Stanton	Montgomery	IA	40.9737°N 95.048°W	2014–2019	1.7 mi (2.7 km)	50 yd (46 m)	$0
EF1	Tornado caused damage to trees, power lines, and outbuildings near Viking Lake State Park.							
EF1	Western Omaha	Douglas	NE	41.2742°N 96.1195°W	2043–2047	0.66 mi (1.06 km)	50 yd (46 m)	$0
EF1	Trees and fences were downed in residential areas.							
EF0	Western Omaha	Douglas	NE	41.3022°N 96.1342°W	2052–2053	0.02 mi (0.032 km)	25 yd (23 m)	$0
EF0	Storm chasers reported a brief tornado.							
EF0	Western Omaha	Douglas	NE	41.3226°N 96.147°W	2053–2055	0.18 mi (0.29 km)	25 yd (23 m)	$0
EF0	Several storm chasers observed a brief tornado over a retention pond.							
EF0	SE of Earlington	Hopkins	KY	37.2626°N 87.5092°W	2133–2134	0.3 mi (0.48 km)	30 yd (27 m)	$0
EF0	Law enforcement reported a brief tornado.							
EF0	ESE of Bedford to S of Conway	Taylor	IA	40.6538°N 94.6087°W	2140–2147	2.23 mi (3.59 km)	200 yd (180 m)	$0
EF0	Storm chasers observed a broad, weak tornado which caused no damage.							
EF0	S of Conway	Taylor	IA	40.6682°N 94.6057°W	2144–2146	0.91 mi (1.46 km)	40 yd (37 m)	$0
EF0	Small satellite tornado developed to the south of the previous tornado, causing no damage.							
EF0	NW of Kidder to SW of Altamont	Daviess	MO	39.8203°N 94.1304°W	2152–2203	4.28 mi (6.89 km)	25 yd (23 m)	$0
EF0	Intermittent tornado uprooted some trees.							
EF0	NW of Clearfield	Taylor	IA	40.822°N 94.5048°W	2212–2213	0.62 mi (1.00 km)	50 yd (46 m)	$25,000
EF0	Brief tornado flipped a camper, collapsed an outbuilding and damaged several trees at a farmstead.							
EF0	N of Slaughters	Webster	KY	37.5207°N 87.5219°W	2215–2217	1.22 mi (1.96 km)	30 yd (27 m)	$0
EF0	Trained storm spotters observed a brief tornado.							
EF0	NE of Oak Knoll	Napa	CA	38.5126°N 122.1178°W	2224–2226	0.19 mi (0.31 km)	10 yd (9.1 m)	$0
EF0	Members of the public reported a waterspout over Lake Berryessa.							
EF0	S of Creston	Union	IA	40.9911°N 94.3531°W	2240–2247	4.01 mi (6.45 km)	250 yd (230 m)	$3,000
EF0	Broad, weak tornado tracked into the southeastern part of Creston, damaging an outbuilding, snapping trees and damaging tree limbs.							
EF0	S of Owensboro	Daviess	KY	37.6866°N 87.1343°W	2322–2330	4.16 mi (6.69 km)	125 yd (114 m)	$100,000
EF0	Minor damage occurred to several homes, and one home had its front porch blown off. A barn had its doors blown off or bent in, a vehicle was badly damaged, and dozens of trees or large limbs were broken. A stand-alone carport was lofted at least 1/10 mile (0.2 km) and several fences were blown over as well.							
EF0	SW of Raymond to SE of Harvel	Montgomery	IL	39.305°N 89.5999°W	2323–2335	4.94 mi (7.95 km)	25 yd (23 m)	$0
EF0	Storm chasers observed intermittent brief touchdowns over open fields, causing no damage.							
EF0	SSE of Waterford	Stanislaus	CA	37.6233°N 120.756°W	2331–2345	0.1 mi (0.16 km)	5 yd (4.6 m)	$500
EF0	A large eucalyptus tree was uprooted, a shed was moved off its foundation and pushed into a fence, and a green house was damaged.							
EF1	E of Owensboro	Daviess	KY	37.7682°N 87.0605°W	2336–2340	2.86 mi (4.60 km)	150 yd (140 m)	$75,000
EF1	A mobile home was destroyed, with at least 2 dozen others receiving minor damage, and several homes had partial loss of shingles. Dozens of trees or large limbs were broken, and a carport and several privacy fences were damaged as well.							
EF0	SSW of Altamont	Effingham	IL	39.0114°N 88.7644°W	2358–2359	0.05 mi (0.080 km)	10 yd (9.1 m)	$0
EF0	A brief tornado touchdown caused no damage.							
EF0	NNE of Olney	Richland	IL	39.7560°N 88.0792°W	0047–0048	0.09 mi (0.14 km)	10 yd (9.1 m)	$0
EF0	Brief tornado caused no damage.							
EF1	NNW of Baring	Knox, Scotland	MO	40.3034°N 92.2399°W	0047–0049	0.23 mi (0.37 km)	40 yd (37 m)	$100,000
EF1	Brief tornado destroyed the roof and walls of a mobile home and pushed it off of its blocks, blew off the door of a farm building and broke small tree limbs.							
EF0	E of Emden	Shelby	MO	39.7938°N 91.8632°W	0123–0124	0.85 mi (1.37 km)	75 yd (69 m)	$0
EF0	A brief tornado destroyed several outbuildings, uprooted large trees and damaged a large church. The tornado continued northeast, causing minor tree damage and structural damage to a property northeast of town before lifting.							
EF0	N of Arbela	Scotland	MO	40.5058°N 92.0175°W	0132–0133	0.23 mi (0.37 km)	30 yd (27 m)	$100,000
EF0	Brief tornado damaged two small farm buildings.							
EF1	NNW of Maywood	Lewis	MO	39.9576°N 91.6278°W	0200–0204	2.01 mi (3.23 km)	150 yd (140 m)	$0
EF1	This tornado lifted a large portion of the roof from a house near the start of the path, and roofing materials from the house were deposited up to 0.5 mi (0.80 km) to the east. Significant tree damage was observed. A full size tanker truck was rolled on its side and two grain bins were destroyed.							

=== April 28 event ===
List of confirmed tornadoes – Thursday, April 28, 2016
EF#	Location	County / Parish	State	Start Coord.	Time (UTC)	Path length	Max width	Damage (2016 USD)
EF1	NW of Zionsville	Boone	IN	39.9897°N 86.3057°W	2026–2027	0.17 mi (0.27 km)	40 yd (37 m)	$35,000
EF1	Roof damage to homes occurred and a large barn was damaged.							
EF0	SE of Turkey	Hall	TX	34.3475°N 100.8193°W	2240	0.06 mi (0.097 km)	10 yd (9.1 m)	$0
EF0	A storm chaser videoed a brief landspout tornado.							

=== April 29 event ===
List of confirmed tornadoes – Friday, April 29, 2016
EF#	Location	County / Parish	State	Start Coord.	Time (UTC)	Path length	Max width	Damage (2016 USD)
EF0	W of Amory	Monroe	MS	33.9701°N 88.6569°W	2026–2034	5.19 mi (8.35 km)	150 yd (140 m)	$10,000
EF0	A few trees were uprooted; large branches were broken.							
EF1	WNW of Elgin to WSW of Fletcher	Comanche	OK	34.792°N 98.315°W	2029–2038	4 mi (6.4 km)	700 yd (640 m)	$10,000
EF1	Some houses had shingle and window damage, and another house had roof damage. Some trees, power lines, outbuildings and a camper were damaged as well. A mobile home was destroyed.							
EF0	NE of Aberdeen	Monroe	MS	33.8848°N 88.4737°W	2041–2043	0.93 mi (1.50 km)	50 yd (46 m)	$10,000
EF0	Several trees were uprooted, one of which fell on a church; large branches were broken.							
EF0	ESE of Cyril	Caddo	OK	34.873°N 98.128°W	2054–2055	0.5 mi (0.80 km)	20 yd (18 m)	$2,000
EF0	A home sustained light damage from a brief tornado.							
EF1	ESE of Cement to ENE of Ninnekah	Grady	OK	34.9°N 98.044°W	2103–2122	12 mi (19 km)	1,000 yd (910 m)	$35,000
EF1	Power lines and trees were damaged, and a house received window damage. At least one outbuilding was destroyed and numerous utility poles were snapped. A mobile home was destroyed and another house received significant damage. Barns were damaged and trees were uprooted as well.							
EF0	NE of Celina	Collin	TX	33.3628°N 96.7228°W	2153–2154	1.34 mi (2.16 km)	65 yd (59 m)	$30,000
EF0	A barn had most of its roofing materials blown off and several trees had limbs broken off.							
EF0	E of Iredell	Bosque	TX	31.98°N 97.7847°W	2233	0.3 mi (0.48 km)	20 yd (18 m)	$0
EF0	A few trees were damaged.							
EF2	Southern Lindale	Smith	TX	32.4991°N 95.4076°W	2250–2252	1 mi (1.6 km)	400 yd (370 m)	$500,000
EF2	A large tornado heavily damaged a dollar store and a sporting goods store in the southern part of Lindale, and homes in the area sustained roof damage.							
EF2	SE of Lindale to NW of Kelsey	Smith, Wood, Upshur	TX	32.5007°N 95.3712°W	2255–2332	25.94 mi (41.75 km)	3,221 yd (2,945 m)	$375,000
EF2	This extremely large, long-track, multiple-vortex wedge tornado began near Lindale and moved northeast, toppling a cell phone tower, completely destroying two mobile homes, and tearing the roof and an exterior wall off of a frame home. A water bottling plant to the north of Hawkins sustained major roof damage, and numerous trees were snapped and uprooted along the path. Two people were injured.							
EF0	SE of Van	Van Zandt	TX	32.4361°N 95.6149°W	2328–2330	2.59 mi (4.17 km)	50 yd (46 m)	$0
EF0	A few trees were downed, temporarily closing roads.							
EF2	E of Weeping Mary to N of Alto	Cherokee	TX	31.598°N 95.116°W	0033–0045	7.19 mi (11.57 km)	820 yd (750 m)	$700,000
EF2	More than 27 homes were damaged, including two that completely lost their roofs, several outbuildings were damaged or destroyed, and at least two travel trailers were destroyed.							
EF1	SW of Reklaw	Cherokee	TX	31.8142°N 95.0391°W	0054–0056	1.06 mi (1.71 km)	150 yd (140 m)	$15,000
EF1	Trees and chicken coops were damaged.							
EF1	WNW of Elysian Fields	Harrison	TX	32.3490°N 94.2631°W	0321–0333	5.58 mi (8.98 km)	820 yd (750 m)	$0
EF1	Numerous trees were knocked and uprooted.							
EF1	NNW of Jonesville to W of Latex	Harrison	TX	32.5287°N 94.1199°W	0346–0359	5.77 mi (9.29 km)	200 yd (180 m)	$50,000
EF1	Two mobile homes were severely damaged and several trees were snapped and uprooted.							

=== April 30 event ===
List of confirmed tornadoes – Saturday, April 30, 2016
EF#	Location	County / Parish	State	Start Coord.	Time (UTC)	Path length	Max width	Damage (2016 USD)
EF1	SE of Woodlawn	Harrison	TX	32.6301°N 94.3715°W	0534–0546	6.63 mi (10.67 km)	350 yd (320 m)	$30,000
EF1	Two homes were damaged and numerous trees were downed along the path.							
EF1	SSW of Buckner	Columbia, Lafayette	AR	33.2428°N 93.4720°W	0541–0544	1.68 mi (2.70 km)	900 yd (820 m)	$0
EF1	Trees were snapped and uprooted.							
EF1	N of Waldo	Columbia	AR	33.3868°N 93.2945°W	0609–0610	0.37 mi (0.60 km)	130 yd (120 m)	$0
EF1	Brief tornado snapped several trees.							
EF1	W of Pineland to SW of Bronson	San Augustine	TX	31.2614°N 94.1245°W	0944–0951	3.14 mi (5.05 km)	380 yd (350 m)	$100,000
EF1	Numerous trees were snapped and uprooted, some of which fell on homes, and two power lines were damaged.							
EF2	SSW of Call	Jasper, Newton	TX	30.5284°N 94.0183°W	1108–1130	9.86 mi (15.87 km)	500 yd (460 m)	$50,000
EF2	A single wide trailer was destroyed and flipped over twice, an aluminum shed near the trailer was lifted and thrown approximately 200 yards (180 m), and numerous trees were snapped and uprooted. Three people were injured.							
EF1	NNW of Palmetto	St. Landry	LA	30.8207°N 91.9543°W	1625–1626	0.47 mi (0.76 km)	50 yd (46 m)	$4,000
EF1	Trees were uprooted; large branches were snapped. An outbuilding was damaged.							

== May ==
Confirmed tornadoes by Enhanced Fujita rating
EFU	EF0	EF1	EF2	EF3	EF4	EF5	Total
16	123	48	17	12	2	0	218

=== May 1 event ===
List of confirmed tornadoes – Sunday, May 1, 2016
EF#	Location	County / Parish	State	Start Coord.	Time (UTC)	Path length	Max width	Damage (2016 USD)
EF0	SW of Linden	Montgomery	IN	40.1701°N 86.917°W	0038	0.01 mi (0.016 km)	25 yd (23 m)	$0
EF0	A tornado briefly touched down in a field, causing no damage.							

=== May 5 event ===
List of confirmed tornadoes – Thursday, May 5, 2016
EF#	Location	County / Parish	State	Start Coord.	Time (UTC)	Path length	Max width	Damage (2016 USD)
EF1	Eastern Wilmington	New Hanover	NC	34.2506°N 77.8175°W	1828–1835	1.8 mi (2.9 km)	75 yd (69 m)	$500,000
EF1	Dozens of trees were snapped or uprooted. One home was damaged by flying tree limbs, whereas another home sustained minor shingle and facia damage. One person was injured. Unusually, no tornado warning was issued by the National Weather Service for the storm that produced this tornado.							

=== May 7 event ===
List of confirmed tornadoes – Saturday, May 7, 2016
EF#	Location	County / Parish	State	Start Coord.	Time (UTC)	Path length	Max width	Damage (Note: All damage totals are in 2016 USD unless otherwise stated.)	Summary
EF0	NNW of Goodrich	Morgan	CO	40.4167°N 104.1187°W	2020	0.5 mi (0.80 km)	50 yd (46 m)	$0	A storm chaser reported a brief tornado touchdown in an open field.
EF0	SW of Buckingham	Weld	CO	40.5392°N 104.1044°W	2025	0.5 mi (0.80 km)	50 yd (46 m)	$0	A storm chaser observed a brief tornado in open country.
EF2	W of Wiggins to NW of Orchard	Weld, Morgan	CO	40.23°N 104.17°W	2055–2110	8.8 mi (14.2 km)	1,320 yd (1,210 m)	$0	A large multiple-vortex tornado developed south of I-76 and moved north, snapping numerous power poles and tossing several RVs. Large trees were snapped and uprooted, ten irrigation pivots were destroyed, and outbuildings were damaged as well. Two minor injuries occurred when a camper was rolled over.
EF0	NW of Fort Morgan	Morgan	CO	40.3459°N 103.8355°W	2135	0.5 mi (0.80 km)	50 yd (46 m)	$0	This tornado remained over open country and caused no damage.
EF0	SW of Eckley	Yuma	CO	39.9592°N 102.5499°W	2206–2215	4.04 mi (6.50 km)	25 yd (23 m)	$0	A storm chaser reported a tornado over open country.
EF0	N of Eckley	Yuma	CO	40.1899°N 102.4529°W	2257–2302	1.29 mi (2.08 km)	25 yd (23 m)	$0	This tornado remained over open country and caused no damage.
EF0	S of Wray	Yuma	CO	40.0311°N 102.2326°W	2337–2340	0.63 mi (1.01 km)	100 yd (91 m)	$0	This tornado remained over open country and caused no damage.
EF2	N of Wray to SE of Wauneta	Yuma	CO	40.1198°N 102.2327°W	2353–0016	7.94 mi (12.78 km)	440 yd (400 m)	$135,000	Three residences and two businesses north of Wray were damaged by this high-end EF2 stovepipe tornado. A semi-truck was picked up and tossed, scattering cargo down US 385. A tractor and several vehicles were flipped and sandblasted by gravel. Large amounts of barbed wire fencing were torn up and strewn throughout the area, and 40 power poles were downed. Four people were injured.
EF1	SE of Petersburg to NE of Otwell	Pike	IN	38.48°N 87.1532°W	0020–0024	4.33 mi (6.97 km)	70 yd (64 m)	$50,000	One home received substantial damage, with the attached garage being blown down and some windows and doors being broken. A farm building and a small shed were blown down and dozens of trees were downed as well.

=== May 8 event ===
List of confirmed tornadoes – Sunday, May 8, 2016
EF#	Location	County / Parish	State	Start Coord.	Time (UTC)	Path length	Max width	Damage	Summary
EF0	SW of Gove	Gove	KS	38.8911°N 100.5182°W	2233–2248	8.85 mi (14.24 km)	25 yd (23 m)	$0	Members of the public observed a tornado over open country.
EF0	S of WaKeeney	Trego	KS	38.7885°N 99.9222°W	2300–2306	1.9 mi (3.1 km)	25 yd (23 m)	$0	A brief tornado remained over open country and caused no damage.
EF0	NE of Indianola	Red Willow	NE	40.2441°N 100.4049°W	2325–2350	0.35 mi (0.56 km)	25 yd (23 m)	$0	This landspout tornado remained over open country, causing no damage.
EF0	NNE of Ellis	Ellis	KS	39.0196°N 99.5261°W	0000–0004	0.9 mi (1.4 km)	50 yd (46 m)	$0	A brief tornado remained over open country and caused no damage.
EFU	SE of Central High	Stephens	OK	34.581°N 98.076°W	0003–0007	1.3 mi (2.1 km)	40 yd (37 m)	$0	Numerous trained storm spotters and storm chasers observed a tornado over open country.
EF2	N of Catharine to S of Codell	Ellis, Rooks	KS	39.05°N 99.2218°W	0008–0023	6.88 mi (11.07 km)	440 yd (400 m)	$2,000	Four large high-voltage transmission line poles were damaged or destroyed. Several outbuildings, trees, and at least 36 power poles were damaged or destroyed as well. The tornado continued into Rooks County and caused minimal damage before lifting.
EF1	SSE of Codell	Rooks	KS	39.1367°N 99.1623°W	0027–0033	2.82 mi (4.54 km)	500 yd (460 m)	$15,000	Trees, fences, and several power poles were damaged.
EF0	E of Stockville	Frontier	NE	40.58°N 100.38°W	0029–0030	0.01 mi (0.016 km)	20 yd (18 m)	$0	A brief tornado remained over open country and caused no damage.

=== May 9 event ===
List of confirmed tornadoes – Monday, May 9, 2016
EF#	Location	County / Parish	State	Start Coord.	Time (UTC)	Path length	Max width	Damage	Summary
EF0	SW of Drakesville	Davis	IA	40.7552°N 92.5004°W	2006–2007	0.33 mi (0.53 km)	10 yd (9.1 m)	$0	This narrow, intermittent landspout caused no damage.
EF4	S of Katie to SW of Wynnewood	Garvin	OK	34.559°N 97.357°W	2106–2127	8.9 mi (14.3 km)	400 yd (370 m)	$1,000,000	1 death – See article on this tornado
EF1	Southeastern Lincoln	Lancaster	NE	40.7365°N 96.6106°W	2125–2131	0.53 mi (0.85 km)	50 yd (46 m)	$0	A brief tornado touched down in a residential area, causing mainly tree, shingle, and fence damage. One home sustained considerable damage to its garage.
EF0	N of Odessa	Buffalo	NE	40.7254°N 99.2471°W	2130	0.01 mi (0.016 km)	20 yd (18 m)	$0	A brief landspout tornado touched down but caused no damage.
EF3	NNW of Davis to SSW of Roff	Murray, Pontotoc	OK	34.565°N 97.146°W	2134–2217	16.6 mi (26.7 km)	2,646 yd (1.503 mi)	$4,000,000	See section on this tornado
EF1	WNW of Bennet	Lancaster	NE	40.6946°N 96.583°W	2153–2156	0.19 mi (0.31 km)	50 yd (46 m)	$0	Tornado destroyed a barn and caused minor tree damage.
EF0	E of Fairfield	Clay	NE	40.4280°N 98.0625°W	2206–2214	2.67 mi (4.30 km)	35 yd (32 m)	$75,000	A weak tornado impacted an irrigation pivot, inflicted minor damage to a walkway overhang at a school, blew windows out of vehicles, and damaged trees and fences.
EF0	E of Wyman	Louisa	IA	41.2°N 91.44°W	2215–2216	0.09 mi (0.14 km)	10 yd (9.1 m)	$0	Brief tornado remained over open country and caused no damage.
EF0	SE of Bushnell	McDonough	IL	40.53°N 90.48°W	2215–2217	0.1 mi (0.16 km)	15 yd (14 m)	$0	This brief tornado remained over open country and caused no damage.
EFU	Lake Thunderbird	Cleveland	OK	35.2228°N 97.2282°W	2216	0.1 mi (0.16 km)	10 yd (9.1 m)	$0	A brief tornado/waterspout occurred over Lake Thunderbird; no damage occurred.
EFU	W of Pontotoc	Johnston	OK	34.48°N 96.755°W	2218–2225	1.5 mi (2.4 km)	20 yd (18 m)	$0	This rope tornado remained over open country and caused no damage.
EF3	S of Connerville to Bromide	Johnston, Coal	OK	34.391°N 96.638°W	2218–2234	9.06 mi (14.58 km)	700 yd (640 m)	$250,000	1 death – Much of the damage from this tornado was limited to snapped trees and power poles, though an unanchored home was obliterated and swept away, killing the occupant and leaving little debris behind. A pickup truck from the residence thrown 250 yards (230 m) into a wooded area and severely mangled. Other structures along the path sustained roof damage. The tornado weakened significantly before striking Bromide and dissipating, causing only minor tree limb damage in town.
EF0	S of Greenbush	Warren	IL	40.7°N 90.53°W	2243–2244	0.09 mi (0.14 km)	25 yd (23 m)	$0	A brief tornado remained over open country and caused no damage.
EF1	ENE of Wapanucka to N of Atoka	Atoka, Coal	OK	34.408°N 96.341°W	2246–2319	12.95 mi (20.84 km)	900 yd (820 m)	$40,000	This tornado damaged and destroyed outbuildings, rolled an oil tank, and blew the roof off of a radio station building. Numerous trees were downed along the path.
EFU	ENE of Wapanucka	Atoka	OK	34.385°N 96.358°W	2247	0.3 mi (0.48 km)	30 yd (27 m)	$0	A brief satellite tornado associated with the previous tornado caused no damage. This tornado may have been anticyclonic.
EF2	W of Nehawka	Cass	NE	40.8213°N 96.0074°W	2249–2315	3.27 mi (5.26 km)	100 yd (91 m)	$0	A house lost its roof and some exterior walls, outbuildings were destroyed, and numerous trees were snapped and uprooted. One person was injured after they were thrown from the house, and survived by hanging on to a small tree.
EF2	SE of Perry to WSW of Morrison	Noble, Payne	OK	36.194°N 97.171°W	2258–2320	6.35 mi (10.22 km)	600 yd (550 m)	$260,000	This large cone tornado caused significant roof damage to two homes, destroyed a mobile home, snapped numerous trees and power poles, and damaged outbuildings.
EF3	SE of Bennington to SW of Soper	Bryan, Choctaw	OK	33.9647°N 95.9914°W	2322–2342	13.8 mi (22.2 km)	3,100 yd (2,800 m)	$3,000,000	An extremely large multiple-vortex tornado with a path width of nearly 1.8 miles (2.9 km) passed near the town of Boswell and destroyed at least three mobile homes, injuring two people. Several frame homes were damaged, some of which sustained major roof loss and the collapse of some exterior walls. Multiple outbuildings were destroyed, numerous power poles were snapped, and many trees were snapped and uprooted, some of which were denuded. Two large metal truss towers were collapsed as well.
EF0	SE of Fact	Clay	KS	39.5°N 97°W	2340–2342	0.02 mi (0.032 km)	25 yd (23 m)	$0	This brief tornado remained over open country, causing no damage.
EF1	Hugo	Choctaw	OK	34.0107°N 95.5699°W	0002–0010	6.1 mi (9.8 km)	650 yd (590 m)	$250,000	Numerous homes and businesses were in town were damaged, storage buildings were destroyed, trees were uprooted, and signs were blown down.
EFU	NW of Sawyer to S of Spencerville	Choctaw	OK	34.077°N 95.4526°W	0018–0030	6 mi (9.7 km)	150 yd (140 m)	$0	A tornado remained over Hugo Lake for nearly all of its duration, with no signs of damage across accessible land areas.
EFU	N of Sawyer	Choctaw	OK	34.072°N 95.3956°W	0025–0026	0.5 mi (0.80 km)	75 yd (69 m)	$0	This satellite tornado associated with the Hugo Lake tornado caused no known damage.
EF0	E of North Branch	Guthrie	IA	41.6517°N 94.6394°W	0046–0101	5.52 mi (8.88 km)	130 yd (120 m)	$5,000	Roof paneling was removed from an outbuilding and augers were flipped over and rolled at a farmstead.
EF0	NW of Wichita	Guthrie	IA	41.7661°N 94.6819°W	0118–0123	1.5 mi (2.4 km)	20 yd (18 m)	$0	This weak, narrow tornado caused no damage.
EF0	S of Homestead	Sheridan	MT	48.39°N 104.49°W	0125–0128	0.46 mi (0.74 km)	30 yd (27 m)	$0	A landspout tornado was observed, and dirt was found disturbed in an open field.
EF1	NE of Spring Hill	Bowie	TX	33.6108°N 94.6584°W	0159–0203	2.04 mi (3.28 km)	390 yd (360 m)	$10,000	A home sustained minor siding loss, an outbuilding was damaged, and trees were snapped or uprooted.
EF1	NE of Spring Hill	Bowie	TX	33.6413°N 94.6154°W	0206–0207	0.15 mi (0.24 km)	120 yd (110 m)	$0	Several trees were snapped or uprooted.
EF1	NW of Avilla	Saline	AR	34.6861°N 92.6107°W	0334–0339	2.7 mi (4.3 km)	200 yd (180 m)	$500,000	Numerous trees were snapped or uprooted, some of which fell and caused roof damage to homes. A manufactured home had its windows broken.

=== May 10 event ===
List of confirmed tornadoes – Tuesday, May 10, 2016
EF#	Location	County / Parish	State	Start Coord.	Time (UTC)	Path length	Max width	Damage	Summary
EF1	ESE of Garfield	Breckinridge	KY	37.7725°N 86.3001°W	1922–1923	0.4 mi (640 m)	25 yd (23 m)	$100,000	This brief, narrow tornado embedded within a larger area of straight-line wind damage destroyed part of a large metal barn, buckled out the walls of two outbuildings and a garage, and left a distinct path of rotation through vegetation.
EF3	SE of Fancy Farm to WSW of Benton	Graves, Marshall	KY	36.7551°N 88.7525°W	1944–2024	19.03 mi (30.63 km)	450 yd (410 m)	$3,550,000	This intense multiple-vortex tornado first caused minor tree, power line, and outbuilding damage before reaching EF3 strength further to the east as a pickup truck was lofted and thrown over 150 yards (140 m). The tornado destroyed a flea market before impacting the north edge of Mayfield, where numerous homes, mobile homes, businesses, garages, and outbuildings were destroyed. Several dozen cars were damaged or destroyed as well, a few of which were lofted onto structures. Further east, the roof was torn off a home, a second home had significant roof and exterior wall loss, and other homes sustained minor damage. Near Benton, a mobile home was overturned, and a frame home sustained minor shingle damage before the tornado dissipated. Thousands of trees and several power lines were downed along the path, and ten people were injured.
EF0	N of Atkinson	Holt	NE	42.55°N 98.98°W	2025–2026	0.2 mi (0.32 km)	20 yd (18 m)	$40,000	A brief tornado tossed a rock into a tractor windshield, causing it to shatter. A machine shed located near the tractor had some minor damage as well.
EF0	SW of Mont	Lyon	KY	36.9055°N 88.0902°W	2055	0.05 mi (0.080 km)	30 yd (27 m)	$0	This weak, brief tornado broke several tree limbs.
EF1	SSE of White Plains to SW of Greenville	Christian, Muhlenberg	KY	37.1132°N 87.3479°W	2225–2235	5.28 mi (8.50 km)	100 yd (91 m)	$135,000	Two barns were destroyed, a home sustained roof damage and had the roof of its deck blown away. Dozens of trees were downed along the path.
EF0	SE of Bristol	Pope	IL	37.4214°N 88.7051°W	2236	0.05 mi (0.080 km)	20 yd (18 m)	$0	This brief tornado caused no known damage.
EF0	ESE of Karbers Ridge	Hardin	IL	37.5730°N 88.2832°W	2256	0.05 mi (80 m)	20 yd (18 m)	$0	This brief tornado broke some small tree limbs.
EF2	NE of Hartford to SE of Dundee	Ohio	KY	37.4635°N 86.878°W	2306–2321	8.6 mi (13.8 km)	300 yd (270 m)	$150,000	This tornado touched down for approximately 200 yards (180 m), lifted briefly, and touched back down, moving to the east-northeast. A large tree fell on an outbuilding, causing significant damage, a home sustained exterior wall damage, a grain silo was toppled, and the wall of a 30 by 50 foot (9.1 by 15.2 m) barn was slid 12 feet (3.7 m). Further along, several barns were damaged, a church sustained roof damage, and an outbuilding had half its roof blown off and tossed 50 feet (15 m). Many trees were downed along the path.
EF1	W of Morganfield	Union	KY	37.6594°N 88.0232°W	2306–2314	3.66 mi (5.89 km)	50 yd (46 m)	$25,000	Numerous trees were snapped and uprooted along the path.
EF0	S of Cerulean	Trigg	KY	36.9345°N 87.7013°W	0017–0021	1.57 mi (2.53 km)	100 yd (91 m)	$20,000	One barn was collapsed and a second was partially destroyed.
EF0	NW of Hopkinsville	Christian	KY	36.9082°N 87.6122°W	0029	0.02 mi (0.032 km)	30 yd (27 m)	$0	This brief tornado caused no known damage.
EF0	N of Hopkinsville	Christian	KY	36.9111°N 87.4818°W	0045	0.02 mi (0.032 km)	20 yd (18 m)	$0	A trained storm spotter reported a brief tornado.

=== May 11 event ===
List of confirmed tornadoes – Wednesday, May 11, 2016
EF#	Location	County / Parish	State	Start Coord.	Time (UTC)	Path length	Max width	Damage (2016 USD)
EF1	W of Owensville	Gibson	IN	38.2653°N 87.7528°W	2202–2203	1.48 mi (2.38 km)	25 yd (23 m)	$5,000
EF1	Many trees were snapped and uprooted along the path.							
EF0	N of Chandler	Warrick	IN	38.2102°N 87.287°W	2258	0.05 mi (0.080 km)	20 yd (18 m)	$0
EF0	A trained storm spotter reported a brief tornado.							
EF0	N of Zeigler	Franklin	IL	37.9348°N 89.0394°W	2334	0.05 mi (0.080 km)	30 yd (27 m)	$0
EF0	A brief tornado was observed over rural land.							
EF2	SSE of Bourbon to SE of Sullivan	Crawford	MO	38.1244°N 91.2033°W	0115–0128	4.43 mi (7.13 km)	700 yd (640 m)	$0
EF2	One small home was destroyed at high-end EF2 intensity, with the roof lifted off and the walls collapsed, another home suffered roof and chimney damage, and several other buildings had roof damage. Several outbuildings were destroyed, and significant tree damage occurred along the path.							

=== May 16 event ===
List of confirmed tornadoes – Monday, May 16, 2016
EF#	Location	County / Parish	State	Start Coord.	Time (UTC)	Path length	Max width	Damage (2016 USD)
EF0	NW of Felt	Cimarron	OK	36.5983°N 102.8152°W	2139–2140	0.52 mi (0.84 km)	25 yd (23 m)	$0
EF0	Several storm chasers observed a brief tornado.							
EF0	NE of Felt	Cimarron	OK	36.5883°N 102.7647°W	2157–2158	0.31 mi (0.50 km)	25 yd (23 m)	$0
EF0	Multiple storm chasers reported a brief tornado.							
EF1	S of Texline	Dallam	TX	36.1488°N 102.9979°W	2240–2242	0.87 mi (1.40 km)	25 yd (23 m)	Unknown
EF1	A grain silo was destroyed, a center pivot irrigation system was flipped, a farm house sustained minor roof damage and trees were damaged.							
EF0	WNW of Dalhart	Dallam	TX	36.1401°N 102.7837°W	2306–2307	0.2 mi (0.32 km)	50 yd (46 m)	Unknown
EF0	A brief tornado flipped a center pivot irrigation system and a small trailer and flattened some grass.							
EF0	S of Canadian	Hemphill	TX	35.8686°N 100.3989°W	0152–0153	0.1 mi (0.16 km)	25 yd (23 m)	$0
EF0	Brief tornado caused minimal tree damage.							
EF0	E of Canadian	Hemphill	TX	35.9193°N 100.3029°W	0206–0225	9.42 mi (15.16 km)	25 yd (23 m)	$0
EF0	Intermittent tornado caused a narrow track of tree damage.							
EF1	WNW of Durham	Hemphill, Roger Mills	TX, OK	35.8641°N 100.0027°W	0235–0237	0.55 mi (0.89 km)	50 yd (46 m)	Unknown
EF1	A wheat field was damaged and two large trees were snapped.							

=== May 17 event ===
List of confirmed tornadoes – Tuesday, May 17, 2016
EF#	Location	County / Parish	State	Start Coord.	Time (UTC)	Path length	Max width	Damage (2016 USD)
EF1	Southwestern Florida Ridge	Indian River	FL	27.5689°N 80.4017°W	1848–1849	0.13 mi (0.21 km)	100 yd (91 m)	$395,000
EF1	Two homes sustained major damage, with a large portion of their roofs damaged, and 16 other homes sustained minor damage to roofs, soffits, and pool enclosures. Several trees were snapped and two trees were uprooted as well.							
EF1	Northwestern Lakewood Park	St. Lucie	FL	27.5578°N 80.4076°W	1851–1853	0.45 mi (0.72 km)	75 yd (69 m)	Unknown
EF1	About 15 homes sustained damage, mainly to roofs, numerous trees were snapped, and several fences and pool enclosures were destroyed.							
EF0	WNW of Fort Pierce North	St. Lucie	FL	27.4876°N 80.3791°W	1915–1918	0.58 mi (0.93 km)	75 yd (69 m)	Unknown
EF0	Four RVs were toppled, several mobile homes sustained minor roof and awning damage, several trees were downed, and one large tree was snapped.							
EF1	Bloomingdale	Chatham	GA	32.1413°N 81.3212°W	2009–2013	0.76 mi (1.22 km)	100 yd (91 m)	Unknown
EF1	Most of a mobile home's roof was ripped off, the roof of an RV was damaged, and roof fascia was ripped off of a home. An outbuilding was damaged and tree damage occurred along the path.							

=== May 19 event ===
List of confirmed tornadoes – Thursday, May 19, 2016
EF#	Location	County / Parish	State	Start Coord.	Time (UTC)	Path length	Max width	Damage (2016 USD)
EF0	SE of Estelle	Plaquemines	LA	29.7823°N 90.0259°W	0400	0.05 mi (0.080 km)	50 yd (46 m)	$0
EF0	Two trees were twisted and/or toppled.							

=== May 20 event ===
List of confirmed tornadoes – Friday, May 20, 2016
EF#	Location	County / Parish	State	Start Coord.	Time (UTC)	Path length	Max width	Damage (2016 USD)
EF0	Gainesville	Alachua	FL	29.6487°N 82.3552°W	1625–1630	0.66 mi (1.06 km)	20 yd (18 m)	Unknown
EF0	Corrugated metal roof panels were blown off, pool lounge chairs were pushed up against a fence, and a broken window were observed on the University of Florida campus. Trees and vegetation were damaged.							

=== May 21 event ===
List of confirmed tornadoes – Saturday, May 21, 2016
EF#	Location	County / Parish	State	Start Coord.	Time (UTC)	Path length	Max width	Damage (2016 USD)
EF1	N of Pompey's Pillar	Yellowstone	MT	46.23°N 108.05°W	2150–2155	2 mi (3.2 km)	150 yd (140 m)	Unknown
EF1	Approximately 100 trees were snapped or uprooted, and two power poles were snapped off with downed power lines.							
EF0	N of Leoti	Wichita	KS	38.6279°N 101.3972°W	0005–0006	0.17 mi (0.27 km)	25 yd (23 m)	$0
EF0	Storm chasers videoed a brief tornado over an open field.							
EF0	N of Leoti	Wichita	KS	38.6767°N 101.374°W	0013–0014	0.43 mi (0.69 km)	25 yd (23 m)	$0
EF0	Storm chasers videoed a brief tornado over open fields.							
EF0	N of Leoti	Wichita	KS	38.6184°N 101.4068°W	0021–0022	0.13 mi (0.21 km)	25 yd (23 m)	$0
EF0	A storm chaser videoed a brief tornado over open fields.							
EF0	N of Leoti	Wichita	KS	38.6761°N 101.3447°W	0115–0116	0.11 mi (0.18 km)	25 yd (23 m)	$0
EF0	A trained storm spotter reported a brief tornado.							

=== May 22 event ===
List of confirmed tornadoes – Sunday, May 22, 2016
EF#	Location	County / Parish	State	Start Coord.	Time (UTC)	Path length	Max width	Damage	Summary
EF0	Kennewick	Benton	WA	46.2°N 119.17°W	0650–0652	0.15 mi (0.24 km)	100 yd (91 m)	$20,000	Members of the public recorded a brief tornado.
EF0	NW of Howardwick	Donley	TX	35.0616°N 100.9416°W	2230–2231	0.36 mi (0.58 km)	25 yd (23 m)	$0	Small tree limbs were broken by this brief tornado.
EF1	NW of Howardwick	Donley	TX	35.062°N 100.9521°W	2239–2248	1.05 mi (1.69 km)	75 yd (69 m)	$0	Trees were snapped or uprooted and a power pole was broken at its rotten base by this large cone tornado.
EF3	SSW of Knott to WNW of Elbow	Howard	TX	32.25°N 101.6411°W	2313–0000	4.01 mi (6.45 km)	500 yd (460 m)	$75,000	This large rain-wrapped tornado occurred to the west of Big Spring. A well-constructed home had its roof completely destroyed and multiple exterior walls collapsed, and two other homes had large sections of their roofs removed. An oil pumpjack was overturned, a car was thrown 100 yards (91 m), and another car was moved several feet. Two poles were bent, wooden power poles were snapped, and a small barn suffered major loss of roof panels. Trees were damaged along the path as well, with trees partially debarked, trunks snapped, and trees uprooted.
EF0	WNW of Artas	Campbell	SD	45.9277°N 99.9445°W	2330–2335	0.28 mi (0.45 km)	30 yd (27 m)	$0	A brief landspout tornado touched down in an open field, causing no damage.
EF0	SE of Waka	Ochiltree	TX	36.1261°N 100.9783°W	2344–2351	2.5 mi (4.0 km)	75 yd (69 m)	Unknown	A pivot irrigation system was damaged.
EF2	S of Lakeview to W of Estelline	Hall	TX	34.66°N 100.7°W	2344–2359	6.59 mi (10.61 km)	600 yd (550 m)	$150,000	This large but intermittent multiple-vortex tornado passed near the rural community of Plaska, snapping numerous trees and power poles. Several pivot irrigation systems were flipped as well.
EF0	E of Stanton	Howard	TX	32.1571°N 101.5585°W	2351–2359	1.52 mi (2.45 km)	100 yd (91 m)	$0	An anticyclonic tornado associated with the Big Spring EF3 tornado remained over open fields, causing no damage.
EF1	SSE of Farnsworth	Ochiltree	TX	36.134°N 100.926°W	2357–0005	1.5 mi (2.4 km)	500 yd (460 m)	Unknown	A barn was destroyed, and power lines and two large sections of pivot irrigation were damaged by this large multiple-vortex wedge tornado.
EF1	SSE of Farnsworth	Ochiltree	TX	36.1536°N 100.9021°W	0004–0007	1.5 mi (2.4 km)	400 yd (370 m)	Unknown	Trees were snapped, power lines were damaged, and pivot irrigation systems were flipped.
EF1	N of Deerfield	Kearny	KS	38.0628°N 101.1347°W	0012–0021	2.82 mi (4.54 km)	75 yd (69 m)	$0	Tornado moved along an unusual northwesterly path, producing little damage.
EF1	S of Perryton	Ochiltree	TX	36.1468°N 100.8636°W	0015–0020	2.4 mi (3.9 km)	75 yd (69 m)	Unknown	Tree limbs were snapped, a power pole was damaged, and debris was scattered in a field.
EF0	S of Elbow	Howard	TX	32.1076°N 101.48°W	0017–0028	2.29 mi (3.69 km)	100 yd (91 m)	$0	Tornado remained over open country, causing no damage.
EF2	NW of Sparks	Todd	SD	43.0301°N 100.4275°W	0025–0035	4.64 mi (7.47 km)	100 yd (91 m)	$10,000	Eight to ten power poles were snapped and several large trees were heavily damaged.
EF0	NNW of Wolf	Kearny	KS	38.1383°N 101.1782°W	0029–0037	4.8 mi (7.7 km)	75 yd (69 m)	$0	Tornado formed after the previous Kearny County tornado dissipated, producing no damage as it moved along a northwesterly path over open fields.
EF1	SW of Winner	Tripp	SD	43.2654°N 100.0451°W	0035–0037	0.68 mi (1.09 km)	20 yd (18 m)	$25,000	A house sustained roof and siding damage, a pole shed was destroyed, several livestock trailers were blown several yards, and a few trees were downed.
EF0	SW of Elbow	Glasscock	TX	32.08°N 101.5654°W	0038–0040	0.49 mi (0.79 km)	50 yd (46 m)	$0	A brief tornado touched down over open country, causing no damage.
EFU	NW of Canadian	Ochiltree	TX	36.1°N 100.8°W	0049–0051	0.25 mi (0.40 km)	50 yd (46 m)	$0	A rain-wrapped cone tornado remained over open grassland, causing no damage.
EF2	N of Garden City	Glasscock	TX	32.0391°N 101.5283°W	0055–0107	3.05 mi (4.91 km)	200 yd (180 m)	$15,000	14 power poles were snapped about 5 feet (1.5 m) above the ground and a metal building sustained a loss of roof panels.
EF1	W of Friend to WSW of Shallow Water	Kearny, Wichita, Scott	KS	38.2611°N 101.1868°W	0110–0144	6.78 mi (10.91 km)	900 yd (820 m)	$0	Large wedge tornado moved along an erratic path through open fields, causing little damage. The tornado was likely capable of producing EF3 or stronger damage based on video evidence.
EF3	N of Garden City	Glasscock	TX	31.9235°N 101.5261°W	0142–0154	3.71 mi (5.97 km)	200 yd (180 m)	$45,000	A large 640 model oil pumpjack was overturned, indicative of EF3 strength winds. Tree branches were broken along other sections of the path.
EF0	NW of Canadian	Ochiltree	TX	36.07°N 100.55°W	0145–0146	0.1 mi (0.16 km)	50 yd (46 m)	$0	A tornado moved over open grassland, producing no observable damage.
EF2	NW of Garden City	Glasscock	TX	31.8922°N 101.4981°W	0156–0202	1.9 mi (3.1 km)	150 yd (140 m)	$107,000	A single-wide mobile home was rolled and destroyed, another mobile home sustained roof damage, and an oil pumpjack was overturned. A metal barn had its roof purlins buckled and trees had their trunks snapped as well.
EF1	SW of Shallow Water	Scott	KS	38.2837°N 101.0218°W	0200–0220	6.4 mi (10.3 km)	100 yd (91 m)	$0	A pivot irrigation sprinkler was damaged by the tornado.
EF0	SSW of Garden City	Glasscock	TX	31.859°N 101.4934°W	0202–0208	1.4 mi (2.3 km)	100 yd (91 m)	$0	Short-lived tornado remained over open country, causing no damage.
EF0	N of Ypsilanti	Stutsman	ND	46.852°N 98.5419°W	0210–0212	1.05 mi (1.69 km)	20 yd (18 m)	$0	Brief tornado remained over open fields, causing no damage.

=== May 23 event ===
List of confirmed tornadoes – Monday, May 23, 2016
EF#	Location	County / Parish	State	Start Coord.	Time (UTC)	Path length	Max width	Damage	Summary
EF0	N of Juniata	Adams	NE	40.6384°N 98.4881°W	1937–1940	0.09 mi (0.14 km)	50 yd (46 m)	$0	Brief landspout tornado in an open field caused no damage.
EF0	N of Granville	Sioux	IA	43.01°N 95.87°W	2141–2142	0.05 mi (0.080 km)	25 yd (23 m)	$0	A brief landspout tornado caused no damage.
EF0	NNW of Woodward	Woodward	OK	36.5066°N 99.4119°W	0125–0141	2.7 mi (4.3 km)	400 yd (370 m)	$10,000	Large but weak tornado moved slowly along a meandering intermittent path, damaging two outbuildings. The University of Massachusetts X-Pol Doppler radar measured EF0 strength winds within the tornado.
EFU	SSE of Selman	Harper	OK	36.617°N 99.43°W	0224–0234	2 mi (3.2 km)	50 yd (46 m)	$0	Tornado remained over open country and caused no damage. The University of Massachusetts X-Pol Doppler radar measured EF0 strength winds within the tornado.
EF3	ESE of Turkey	Motley, Hall	TX	34.3068°N 100.7142°W	0230–0306	9.99 mi (16.08 km)	880 yd (800 m)	$150,000	A strong wedge tornado bent several large steel electrical poles to the ground. Trees were also uprooted. The tornado moved along an unusual northwestward path.

=== May 24 event ===
List of confirmed tornadoes – Tuesday, May 24, 2016
EF#	Location	County / Parish	State	Start Coord.	Time (UTC)	Path length	Max width	Damage	Summary
EF1	NW of Republic	Marquette	MI	46.445°N 88.1106°W	1821–1833	3.78 mi (6.08 km)	200 yd (180 m)	$10,000	Numerous large trees were downed.
EF1	S of Greenwood Reservoir	Marquette	MI	46.4303°N 87.8369°W	1854–1902	3.87 mi (6.23 km)	200 yd (180 m)	$50,000	Numerous large trees were downed, some of which fell on a cabin, and the cabin also suffered chimney damage. A trampoline was damaged and lawn furniture was tossed as well.
EF0	SSE of Modoc	Scott	KS	38.4241°N 101.0543°W	2056–2100	1 mi (1.6 km)	50 yd (46 m)	$0	A storm chaser reported and photographed what appeared to be a landspout.
EF0	E of Modoc	Scott	KS	38.451°N 101.0116°W	2104–2122	4.17 mi (6.71 km)	200 yd (180 m)	$0	Several storm chasers videotaped and photographed a tornado which did not hit anything.
EF0	N of Manning	Scott	KS	38.6029°N 101.7326°W	2155	0.1 mi (0.16 km)	50 yd (46 m)	$0	Brief tornado was reported by an off-duty NWS employee.
EF0	N of Manning	Scott	KS	38.6067°N 101.7222°W	2155–2211	0.7 mi (1.1 km)	100 yd (91 m)	$0	Tornado was reported and documented by an off-duty NWS employee.
EF0	ENE of Healy	Lane	KS	38.6044°N 101.5899°W	2213–2216	1.2 mi (1.9 km)	50 yd (46 m)	$0	Tornado caused little to no damage.
EF0	ESE of Healy	Lane	KS	38.5773°N 100.5311°W	2224–2231	0.8 mi (1.3 km)	125 yd (114 m)	$0	Tornado was reported by an off-duty NWS employee.
EF0	NE of Healy	Lane	KS	38.6301°N 101.5489°W	2226–2228	0.1 mi (0.16 km)	15 yd (14 m)	$0	Brief tornado was reported by a storm chaser.
EF1	E of Shamrock to NE of Bristow	Creek	OK	35.9085°N 96.4836°W	2228–2243	8 mi (13 km)	900 yd (820 m)	$750,000	Multiple homes were damaged, some severely, numerous outbuildings were destroyed, and many trees were either snapped or uprooted.
EF0	ENE of Shields	Lane	KS	38.6356°N 101.3196°W	2249–2250	0.1 mi (0.16 km)	15 yd (14 m)	$0	Brief tornado was reported by a storm chaser.
EF3	NW of Minneola to NNE of Ensign	Ford	KS	37.5031°N 100.1355°W	2255–2325	14.7 mi (23.7 km)	675 yd (617 m)	$0	Large cone tornado completely swept away a manufactured home, with nearby vehicles being thrown up to 150 yards away and mangled. Wooden power poles were snapped off and carried long distances through the air, and irrigation pivots were destroyed. One person taking shelter inside a bunker was injured when a piece of pipe penetrated the concrete wall. Video evidence suggests that this tornado may have been capable of producing EF4 damage.
EF0	NW of Minneola	Ford	KS	37.5342°N 100.0931°W	2259–2301	0.7 mi (1.1 km)	50 yd (46 m)	$0	Brief and intermittent tornado under a different mesocyclone east-northeast of the previous tornado.
EF0	SSW of Alamota	Lane	KS	38.3054°N 101.3457°W	2259–2302	0.8 mi (1.3 km)	50 yd (46 m)	$0	Brief tornado caused little to no damage.
EF0	SW of Alamota to SE of Beeler	Lane	KS	38.4185°N 100.2717°W	2304–2310	1.7 mi (2.7 km)	50 yd (46 m)	$0	Tornado tracked to the south-southeast and caused no known damage.
EF3	ENE of Ravanna to SW of Ness City	Hodgeman, Ness	KS	38.237°N 100.1663°W	2312–2337	11.02 mi (17.73 km)	300 yd (270 m)	$0	This strong tornado partially debarked hardwood trees, damaged farm machinery, fences, and storage tanks, and destroyed barns and outbuildings along its path.
EF1	ESE of Ensign	Ford	KS	37.6182°N 100.091°W	2314–2322	1.4 mi (2.3 km)	50 yd (46 m)	$0	Large tree branches were broken and a stock tank was blown away. Tornado touched down to the east of the Minneola EF3 tornado.
EF0	ESE of Ensign	Ford	KS	37.6281°N 100.1146°W	2320–2321	0.2 mi (0.32 km)	50 yd (46 m)	$0	Brief cone tornado touched down between the Minneola EF3 tornado and the previous tornado and lasted 45 to 60 seconds.
EF2	W of Ensign to SW of Dodge City	Ford	KS	37.646°N 100.0988°W	2322–2336	5 mi (8.0 km)	550 yd (500 m)	$0	Large cone tornado. Power poles were snapped, a pivot sprinkler was flipped, and two more were damaged. A residence had its roof lifted off as well. The tornado appeared visually to be much stronger than an EF2.
EF0	SSW of Dodge City	Ford	KS	37.6601°N 100.0816°W	2328–2333	2.7 mi (4.3 km)	90 yd (82 m)	$0	Intermittent tornado touchdowns, sometimes with two at the same time, to the east of the previous tornado.
EF1	SW of Dodge City	Ford	KS	37.7003°N 100.0855°W	2332–2338	2.9 mi (4.7 km)	50 yd (46 m)	$0	Tornado touched down to the northeast of the Ensign EF2 tornado as it was dissipating and damaged two irrigation pivots.
EF1	SW of Ness City	Ness	KS	38.338°N 100.0412°W	2343–2350	2.9 mi (4.7 km)	50 yd (46 m)	$0	Tornado touched down to the north of the Ness City EF3 tornado after it lifted and broke some large tree branches.
EF0	Akron	Washington	CO	40.16°N 103.21°W	2344	0.01 mi (0.016 km)	50 yd (46 m)	$0	A trained storm spotter reported a brief tornado.
EFU	ENE of Pringle	Hutchinson	TX	36.04°N 101.22°W	2344–2346	0.36 mi (0.58 km)	25 yd (23 m)	$0	An off-duty NWS employee reported an anticyclonic tornado.
EF0	SE of Shamrock	Adams	CO	39.83°N 103.71°W	2348	0.01 mi (0.016 km)	50 yd (46 m)	$0	A trained storm spotter reported a brief tornado.
EF2	SW of Dodge City to SE of Kalvesta	Ford, Hodgeman	KS	37.6999°N 100.0935°W	2352–0016	16.7 mi (26.9 km)	1,800 yd (1,600 m)	$0	This large multiple-vortex tornado snapped power poles, flipped a semi-truck, heavily damaged multiple homes, and destroyed pivot sprinklers and outbuildings. Two people were injured. Wind velocities within the tornado indicated that it may have briefly reached EF5 intensity.
EF0	NW of Dodge City	Ford	KS	37.7922°N 100.0695°W	2355–2356	0.1 mi (0.16 km)	50 yd (46 m)	$0	Storm chasers encountered a brief tornado.
EF0	S of Ness City	Ness	KS	38.4058°N 99.9547°W	2356–0011	6.2 mi (10.0 km)	150 yd (140 m)	$0	Trained storm spotters observed a tornado.
EF0	NW of Jetmore	Hodgeman	KS	38.1651°N 100.0395°W	0003–0005	0.6 mi (0.97 km)	150 yd (140 m)	$0	Storm chasers reported a tornado.
EF3	N of Dodge City	Ford	KS	37.8614°N 100.0497°W	0007–0017	1.9 mi (3.1 km)	150 yd (140 m)	$0	This large cone tornado caused extensive damage at the Ford County Landfill, where a large metal frame industrial building was destroyed. A large propane tank was thrown onto a road and ruptured, and an outbuilding was also destroyed further along the path.
EF3	NW of Jetmore to SSE of Beeler	Hodgeman, Ness	KS	38.1961°N 100.0382°W	0011–0030	7.7 mi (12.4 km)	700 yd (640 m)	$0	A well-built frame home had its roof torn off and some exterior walls collapsed, with debris scattered long distances downwind. An oil tank was blown over, and a stock trailer was found three miles away from where it originated. Other pieces of machinery were found up to a mile away. Numerous power poles were snapped, and pivot sprinklers were damaged as well.
EF1	N of Dodge City	Ford, Hodgeman	KS	37.906°N 100.0252°W	0015–0024	2.7 mi (4.3 km)	50 yd (46 m)	$0	A trailer house, an outbuilding, and some trees were damaged.
EF0	E of Ness City	Ness	KS	38.4415°N 99.8154°W	0017–0020	1.32 mi (2.12 km)	50 yd (46 m)	$0	A trained storm spotter reported a south-southeast-moving tornado.
EF1	W of Centerview	Edwards	KS	37.7859°N 99.4057°W	0025–0033	4.3 mi (6.9 km)	100 yd (91 m)	$0	Trees were uprooted and pivot sprinklers were damaged.
EF0	WNW of Jetmore	Hodgeman	KS	37.9765°N 99.9408°W	0036–0042	3.5 mi (5.6 km)	50 yd (46 m)	$0	A tornado narrowly missed a farm house.
EF0	SE of Akron	Washington	CO	40.16°N 103.21°W	0044	0.01 mi (0.016 km)	50 yd (46 m)	$0	Brief touchdown caused no damage.
EF1	ENE of Platner	Washington	CO	40.1647°N 103.0467°W	0047–0050	0.86 mi (1.38 km)	20 yd (18 m)	Unknown	A pole barn was lofted and completely destroyed, power poles were snapped, and trees were damaged.
EF2	W of Centerview	Edwards	KS	37.7947°N 99.3725°W	0049–0059	5.4 mi (8.7 km)	150 yd (140 m)	$0	This strong anticyclonic tornado snapped power poles and tree limbs, left swirl marks in a wheat field, mangled a pivot sprinkler, and knocked over a sign.
EF0	W of Jetmore	Hodgeman	KS	38.1035°N 100.082°W	0055–0056	0.5 mi (0.80 km)	50 yd (46 m)	$0	Storm chasers reported a brief tornado.
EF3	N of Centerview to W of Belpre	Edwards	KS	37.8645°N 99.2707°W	0100–0129	8.3 mi (13.4 km)	1,100 yd (1,000 m)	$0	Large wedge tornado mangled a well-anchored pivot sprinkler, tearing a large, heavy concrete anchor completely out of the ground. Other pivot sprinklers along the path were flipped or sustained lesser damage, and a storage tank was overturned. Trees were denuded and debarked, large concrete feed bunks were thrown, and farm fields were scoured. Homes sustained roof damage, while outbuildings and grain bins were destroyed as well.
EF0	N of Yuma	Yuma	CO	40.2279°N 102.7278°W	0136–0139	1.21 mi (1.95 km)	25 yd (23 m)	$0	An emergency manager reported a tornado.
EF0	E of Sawyer	Pratt	KS	37.4775°N 98.6651°W	0125–0132	2.3 mi (3.7 km)	75 yd (69 m)	$0	Trained storm spotters reported a tornado.
EF0	SW of Otis	Rush	KS	38.5015°N 99.0984°W	0138–0140	0.2 mi (0.32 km)	50 yd (46 m)	$0	Some trees sustained minor damage.
EF0	S of Imperial	Chase	NE	40.39°N 101.64°W	0306	0.1 mi (0.16 km)	50 yd (46 m)	$50,000	Brief tornado flipped and dragged an empty irrigation pivot.

=== May 25 event ===
List of confirmed tornadoes – Wednesday, May 25, 2016
EF#	Location	County / Parish	State	Start Coord.	Time (UTC)	Path length	Max width	Damage	Summary
EF1	NNE of Morris	Okmulgee	OK	35.7108°N 95.8300°W	0629–0635	1.8 mi (2.9 km)	350 yd (320 m)	$5,000	Several trees and tree limbs were snapped, along with a power pole.
EF0	SW of Villard	Pope	MN	45.6989°N 95.2829°W	2010–2012	0.16 mi (0.26 km)	25 yd (23 m)	$10,000	Several boats were flipped, a shed was damaged, and shingles were blown off a roof at Amelia Lake.
EF0	SW of Minneapolis	Ottawa	KS	39.0566°N 97.7891°W	2308–2309	0.47 mi (0.76 km)	25 yd (23 m)	$0	Brief touchdown caused no damage.
EF0	NE of St. Anthony	Stearns	MN	45.6894°N 94.6042°W	2309–2315	3.3 mi (5.3 km)	25 yd (23 m)	$15,000	A few trees were blown down, and a small amount of tin was peeled off of a barn roof.
EF4	ENE of Niles to ESE of Chapman	Ottawa, Dickinson	KS	38.9955°N 97.4365°W	0007–0140	25.09 mi (40.38 km)	900 yd (820 m)	Unknown	See article on this tornado - Eight people were injured.
EF1	E of Dwight to SSE of Alta Vista	Morris, Wabaunsee	KS	38.85°N 96.5614°W	0227–0240	5.3 mi (8.5 km)	75 yd (69 m)	Unknown	Two barns sustained roof damage and power poles were snapped along the path.
EF2	WNW of Carrier to SW of Hillsdale	Garfield	OK	36.4966°N 98.0699°W	0253–0312	5 mi (8.0 km)	300 yd (270 m)	$20,000	This slow-moving cone tornado was caught on camera and broadcast live on television. 19 empty rail cars were blown off the tracks and a very large tree was downed.
EF1	S of Eskridge	Wabaunsee	KS	38.7743°N 96.1443°W	0325–0332	3.53 mi (5.68 km)	50 yd (46 m)	Unknown	A small farm building had its walls collapsed and large tree branches were broken.

=== May 26 event ===
List of confirmed tornadoes – Thursday, May 26, 2016
EF#	Location	County / Parish	State	Start Coord.	Time (UTC)	Path length	Max width	Damage	Summary
EF1	Eastern Bryan	Brazos	TX	30.6792°N 96.3106°W	1730–1738	2.86 mi (4.60 km)	50 yd (46 m)	$1,000,000	This high-end EF1 tornado moved through residential areas of Bryan, causing major roof damage to homes and downing trees.
EF0	SE of St. George	Riley	KS	39.1733°N 96.3958°W	1903	0.01 mi (0.016 km)	25 yd (23 m)	$0	Law enforcement reported a brief touchdown near the Kansas River which caused no damage.
EF1	Wamego to N of Louisville	Pottawatomie	KS	39.1976°N 96.3104°W	1920–1945	5.55 mi (8.93 km)	200 yd (180 m)	Unknown	Tornado downed numerous trees and caused roof damage to homes in the towns of Wamego and Louisville. Rural properties sustained considerable damage outside of Wamego.
EF0	E of Independence	Washington	TX	30.312°N 96.2315°W	2003–2006	0.35 mi (0.56 km)	30 yd (27 m)	$10,000	Numerous trees were downed in a convergent pattern.
EF0	Wallace Pack Unit	Grimes	TX	30.3244°N 96.1074°W	2020–2021	0.11 mi (0.18 km)	30 yd (27 m)	$50,000	Numerous trees were uprooted around the prison, and cars in the parking lot were moved in different directions.
EF1	SSE of Navasota	Grimes	TX	30.3137°N 96.0487°W	2028–2031	0.1 mi (0.16 km)	50 yd (46 m)	$100,000	Brief tornado tore much of the roof off of a two-story home, along with a wall on the second floor. Numerous large trees were snapped and uprooted as well. This tornado occurred simultaneously with the other Navasota tornado.
EF2	SSE of Navasota	Grimes	TX	30.3069°N 96.0471°W	2029–2032	1.28 mi (2.06 km)	100 yd (91 m)	$200,000	Tornado destroyed a large metal building and a house, and numerous large trees were uprooted and snapped along the path.
EF0	SW of Rossville	Shawnee	KS	39.1198°N 95.9632°W	2100	0.01 mi (0.016 km)	25 yd (23 m)	$0	Brief touchdown caused no damage.
EF0	Southern Silver Lake	Shawnee	KS	39.0938°N 95.8586°W	2106–2109	1.81 mi (2.91 km)	50 yd (46 m)	Unknown	A brief tornado caused tree damage and minor structural damage within a larger region of damaging winds. One outbuilding was heavily damaged.
EF0	SSW of Whiteman Air Force Base	Johnson	MO	38.63°N 93.62°W	2203–2205	1.38 mi (2.22 km)	25 yd (23 m)	$0	Tornado remained over open country and caused no damage.
EF0	S of Kit Carson	Cheyenne	CO	38.6401°N 102.7521°W	2305–2308	0.02 mi (0.032 km)	50 yd (46 m)	$0	Tornado remained over open country and caused no damage.
EF0	S of Seibert	Kit Carson	CO	39.3611°N 102.8663°W	2323–2329	4.1 mi (6.6 km)	25 yd (23 m)	$0	Tornado remained over open country and caused no damage.
EF1	Northwestern Conroe	Montgomery	TX	30.3350°N 95.5055°W	2252–2253	0.96 mi (1.54 km)	300 yd (270 m)	$100,000	Tree damage occurred along the path.
EF1	Burkett	Coleman	TX	31.9511°N 99.3084°W	0101–0108	5.44 mi (8.75 km)	400 yd (370 m)	$0	A few trees and tree limbs were snapped, and outbuildings were damaged or destroyed. A community center in town sustained roof damage.
EFU	NE of Glazier	Hemphill	TX	36.05°N 100.06°W	0110–0113	0.11 mi (0.18 km)	25 yd (23 m)	$0	Brief rope tornado remained over open country and caused no damage.
EF0	ESE of Sidney	Comanche	TX	31.9422°N 98.7168°W	0146–0149	1.01 mi (1.63 km)	40 yd (37 m)	$30,000	Two homes sustained minor damage, at least three farm storage buildings were damaged or destroyed, and multiple trees were uprooted and large branches were broken off at a cemetery.

=== May 27 event ===
List of confirmed tornadoes – Friday, May 27, 2016
EF#	Location	County / Parish	State	Start Coord.	Time (UTC)	Path length	Max width	Damage (2016 USD)
EF0	NW of Jasper	Jasper	TX	31.0656°N 94.1305°W	1828–1829	0.05 mi (0.080 km)	50 yd (46 m)	$2,000
EF0	A few trees were downed.							
EF0	WNW of Oklee	Red Lake	MN	47.84°N 95.92°W	1914–1915	0.05 mi (0.080 km)	50 yd (46 m)	$0
EF0	Law enforcement reported a brief tornado in an open field.							
EF0	SE of Fargo	Clay	MN	46.82°N 96.7°W	1957–1958	0.05 mi (0.080 km)	75 yd (69 m)	$0
EF0	A storm chaser observed a tornado over rural lands.							
EF0	NNW of Glyndon	Clay	MN	46.9°N 96.6°W	2001–2002	0.05 mi (0.080 km)	50 yd (46 m)	$0
EF0	Broadcast media observed a brief tornado over an open field.							
EFU	N of Towner	Kiowa	CO	38.54°N 102.08°W	2043–2044	0.09 mi (0.14 km)	50 yd (46 m)	$0
EFU	A brief landspout tornado touched down over a field, causing no damage.							
EF0	NW of Horace	Greeley	KS	38.5107°N 101.7408°W	2051–2058	0.13 mi (0.21 km)	25 yd (23 m)	$0
EF0	An off-duty NWS employee observed a landspout tornado.							
EFU	ESE of Towner	Kiowa	CO	38.4645°N 102.0629°W	2055–2100	1 mi (1.6 km)	100 yd (91 m)	$0
EFU	A landspout tornado occurred over open country, causing no damage.							
EFU	N of Towner	Kiowa	CO	38.4845°N 102.08°W	2104–2106	0.2 mi (0.32 km)	75 yd (69 m)	$0
EFU	A brief landspout tornado touched down over a field, causing no damage.							
EF0	E of Tribune	Greeley	KS	38.4766°N 101.6671°W	2112–2114	0.1 mi (0.16 km)	25 yd (23 m)	$0
EF0	An off-duty NWS employee observed a landspout tornado.							
EF0	W of Leoti	Wichita	KS	38.5013°N 101.5447°W	2113–2117	0.93 mi (1.50 km)	25 yd (23 m)	$0
EF0	Law enforcement observed a landspout tornado.							
EF0	ESE of Augusta	Butler	KS	37.6499°N 96.8398°W	2226–2227	0.1 mi (0.16 km)	50 yd (46 m)	$0
EF0	An off-duty NWS employee observed a brief tornado over open country.							
EF1	Brandon	Fond du Lac	WI	43.7294°N 88.7834°W	2235–2252	4.5 mi (7.2 km)	330 yd (300 m)	$100,000
EF1	Trees and tree branches in town were snapped and houses sustained roof and window damage.							
EF0	N of Dighton	Lane	KS	38.5388°N 100.4444°W	2242–2247	1.88 mi (3.03 km)	50 yd (46 m)	$0
EF0	A trained storm spotter observed a tornado.							
EF0	N of Alamota	Lane	KS	38.5046°N 100.3449°W	2316–2322	1.34 mi (2.16 km)	50 yd (46 m)	$0
EF0	A trained storm spotter reported a tornado.							
EF0	NNE of Ness City	Ness	KS	38.6042°N 99.8561°W	2321–2327	0.85 mi (1.37 km)	50 yd (46 m)	$0
EF0	A storm chaser observed a tornado.							

=== May 28 event ===
List of confirmed tornadoes – Saturday, May 28, 2016
EF#	Location	County / Parish	State	Start Coord.	Time (UTC)	Path length	Max width	Damage (2016 USD)
EF0	SW of Bowdle	Edmunds	SD	45.4184°N 99.6829°W	1602–1603	0.06 mi (0.097 km)	20 yd (18 m)	$0
EF0	Landspout tornado briefly touched down over an open field, causing no damage.							
EF0	SSW of Bowdle	Edmunds	SD	45.4163°N 99.6853°W	1610–1611	0.09 mi (0.14 km)	20 yd (18 m)	$0
EF0	A second landspout tornado briefly touched down.							
EF0	SSE of Lennox	Lincoln	SD	43.26°N 96.86°W	1924–1925	0.09 mi (0.14 km)	25 yd (23 m)	$0
EF0	A trained storm spotter reported a landspout tornado.							
EF0	NNW of Kingsley	Plymouth	IA	42.61°N 95.98°W	2252–2253	0.09 mi (0.14 km)	25 yd (23 m)	$0
EF0	A trained storm spotter observed a landspout tornado.							
EF2	W of Noxville	Kimble	TX	30.4034°N 99.467°W	0050–0102	4.82 mi (7.76 km)	150 yd (140 m)	$0
EF2	A home had part of its roof lifted off, and the porch was destroyed and carried for a few miles. Numerous oak trees were snapped and uprooted, large cedar trees were snapped and large tree branches were broken off.							

=== May 29 event ===
List of confirmed tornadoes – Sunday, May 29, 2016
EF#	Location	County / Parish	State	Start Coord.	Time (UTC)	Path length	Max width	Damage (2016 USD)
EF0	NW of Elbert	Throckmorton	TX	33.31°N 99.05°W	0109–0110	0.02 mi (0.032 km)	25 yd (23 m)	$0
EF0	Trained storm spotters reported a brief tornado touchdown.							
EF0	NNW of Albany	Shackelford	TX	32.8929°N 99.363°W	0228–0236	1.71 mi (2.75 km)	50 yd (46 m)	$0
EF0	A member of the public photographed a lightning-illuminated tornado.							

=== May 30 event ===
List of confirmed tornadoes – Monday, May 30, 2016
EF#	Location	County / Parish	State	Start Coord.	Time (UTC)	Path length	Max width	Damage (2016 USD)
EF0	Taft	San Patricio	TX	27.9722°N 97.4104°W	1454–1455	0.55 mi (0.89 km)	25 yd (23 m)	$50,000
EF0	Large trees were snapped at their base, a few homes lost shingles, and outdoor furniture was tossed.							
EF0	WNW of Lorenzo	Cheyenne	NE	41.0722°N 103.1209°W	2005–2010	0.83 mi (1.34 km)	30 yd (27 m)	$0
EF0	A storm chaser observed a landspout tornado.							
EF0	SW of Lorenzo	Cheyenne	NE	41.0091°N 103.1043°W	2007–2015	0.48 mi (0.77 km)	30 yd (27 m)	$0
EF0	A storm chaser reported a landspout tornado.							
EF1	W of Peetz	Logan	CO	41.0018°N 103.2068°W	2018–2031	4.49 mi (7.23 km)	100 yd (91 m)	Unknown
EF1	A farmstead was damaged.							
EF0	NW of Lorenzo	Cheyenne	NE	41.0807°N 103.0907°W	2020–2030	1.34 mi (2.16 km)	30 yd (27 m)	$0
EF0	A storm chaser reported a landspout tornado.							
EF0	SSE of Edinburg	Grundy	MO	40.0334°N 93.6757°W	2314	0.01 mi (0.016 km)	10 yd (9.1 m)	$0
EF0	An emergency manager observed a brief tornado.							
EF0	SSW of Brimson	Grundy	MO	40.13°N 93.74°W	2329	0.01 mi (0.016 km)	10 yd (9.1 m)	$0
EF0	An emergency manager reported a brief tornado.							

=== May 31 event ===
List of confirmed tornadoes – Tuesday, May 31, 2016
EF#	Location	County / Parish	State	Start Coord.	Time (UTC)	Path length	Max width	Damage (2016 USD)
EF0	ENE of Elvira	Clinton	IA	41.8865°N 90.318°W	1504–1505	0.03 mi (0.048 km)	10 yd (9.1 m)	$0
EF0	A member of the public reported a brief tornado touchdown in an open field.							
EFU	N of Pocasset	Grady	OK	35.241°N 97.96°W	2228–2232	0.5 mi (0.80 km)	30 yd (27 m)	$0
EFU	Many members of the public reported the first of three simultaneous landspout tornadoes.							
EFU	NW of Pocasset	Grady	OK	35.226°N 97.986°W	2228–2234	0.7 mi (1.1 km)	30 yd (27 m)	$0
EFU	Many members of the public reported the second of three simultaneous landspout tornadoes.							
EFU	W of Pocasset	Grady	OK	35.193°N 98.019°W	2228–2235	0.7 mi (1.1 km)	30 yd (27 m)	$0
EFU	Many members of the public reported the final of three simultaneous landspout tornadoes.							
EF0	WNW of Three Rivers	Live Oak	TX	28.488°N 98.2871°W	2233–2238	2.66 mi (4.28 km)	25 yd (23 m)	$0
EF0	A waterspout formed over Choke Canyon Reservoir and moved ashore.							
EF1	Southern Kingsville	Kleberg	TX	27.4919°N 97.8512°W	2330–2335	0.9 mi (1.4 km)	200 yd (180 m)	$2,500,000
EF1	Windows were broken and shingles were blown off at an apartment complex, part of a home's roof was blown off, and vehicle windows were smashed. Numerous large trees and power poles were snapped as well.							
EF1	Southern Kingsville	Kleberg	TX	27.4664°N 97.8316°W	2341–2347	2.25 mi (3.62 km)	400 yd (370 m)	$1,000,000
EF1	A metal building had part of its roof blown off, bleachers at a park were tossed 300 yd (270 m), and many large trees and utility poles were snapped.							
EF0	SW of Ricardo	Kleberg	TX	27.3794°N 97.8829°W	2353–2359	0.4 mi (0.64 km)	30 yd (27 m)	$0
EF0	Weak tornado occurred over an open field, causing no damage.							
EF0	W of Unionville	Putnam	MO	40.4725°N 93.04°W	0003–0004	0.01 mi (0.016 km)	20 yd (18 m)	$0
EF0	Members of the public videoed a brief landspout tornado.							

== See also ==
- Tornadoes of 2016
- List of United States tornadoes from January to March 2016
- List of United States tornadoes from June to August 2016
