= Coahoma High School =

Location
- 600 N Main St; Coahoma, Texas 79511; United States; 32.3031°N 101.3036°W

Information
- School type: Public high school
- School district: Coahoma Independent School District
- Principal: Kristen Joslin
- Teaching staff: 17.00 (FTE)
- Grades: 9-12
- Enrollment: 303 (2023-2024)
- Student to teacher ratio: 17.82
- Colors: Red, White, and Blue
- Athletics conference: UIL Class 3A
- Mascot: Bulldog/Bulldogette
- Website: Coahoma High School

Coahoma High School is a public high school located in Coahoma, Texas. It is part of the Coahoma Independent School District located in eastern Howard County and classified as a 3A school by the UIL. New renovations and bond projects have been completed in recent years including an Indoor Turf Facility and renovations to outdoor sports facilities including on campus fields for football, baseball, and softball as well as new equipment for students totaling $12 Million. In 2011, the school was rated "Academically Acceptable" by the Texas Education Agency.

== Athletics ==
The Coahoma Bulldogs compete in cross country, volleyball, football, basketball, powerlifting, tennis, golf, track, rodeo, softball and baseball.

=== State titles ===
- Softball
  - 1998 (2A), 2023 (3A), 2024 (3A), 2025 (3A/D2)
  - The Bulldogettes saw total success from 2021-2025 due to the core duo of Hannah Wells and Mia Clemmer, including 3 consecutive state titles and state runner up in their four years with the program. Wells is an All American and National Gatorade Player of the Year in Softball.

==== State finalists ====
- Softball
  - 2026 (3A/D2)
