= Forsan High School =

Coordinates: 32.1117°N 101.3687°W

Forsan Jr/Sr High School

Location
- 411 W 6th St; Forsan, Texas 79733; United States

Information
- School type: Public High School
- School district: Forsan Independent School District
- Principal: Rod Been
- Staff: 32.25 (FTE)
- Grades: 6-12
- Enrollment: 388 (2023-2024)
- Student to teacher ratio: 12.03
- Colors: Black & White
- Athletics conference: UIL Class 2A
- Mascot: Buffalo
- Yearbook: The Buffalo Trail
- Website: Jr/Sr High School website

Forsan Jr/Sr High School is a public high school located in Forsan, Texas, USA and classified as a 2A school by the UIL. It is part of the Forsan Independent School District located in southwestern Howard County. In 2015, the school was rated "Met Standard" by the Texas Education Agency.

== Athletics ==
The Forsan Buffaloes compete in these sports -

Cross Country, Football, Basketball, Powerlifting, Golf, Tennis, Track, Softball & Baseball

=== State Champion Titles ===
- Boys Cross Country -
  - 2012(1A)
- Girls Golf -
  - 1972(B)
- Softball -
  - 2009 (1A), 2010(1A)

== Band ==
- UIL Marching Band State Champions under direction of: Jim Rhodes and Misty Moellendorf
  - 2007(1A)

The Forsan Buffalo Band was Silver Medalist at State in 2005, 2009, 2013, and 2020.
