= Sand Springs, Texas =

- Census-designated place
- Location within Texas Location within the United States
- Coordinates: 32°16′57″N 101°21′03″W
- Country: United States
- State: Texas
- County: Howard

Area
  - Total: 2.570 sq mi (6.66 km^{2})
  - Land: 2.570 sq mi (6.66 km^{2})
  - Water: 0 sq mi (0 km^{2})
- Elevation: 2,431 ft (741 m)

Population (2020)
  - Total: 878
  - Density: 342/sq mi (132/km^{2})
- Time zone: UTC-6 (Central (CST))
  - Summer (DST): UTC-5 (CDT)
- Area code: 432
- GNIS feature ID: 1346542

Sand Springs is an unincorporated community and census-designated place in Howard County, Texas, United States. As of the 2020 census, Sand Springs had a population of 878. Interstate 20 passes through the community.

== Geography ==
According to the U.S. Census Bureau, the community has an area of 2.570 square miles (6.66 km^{2}), all land.

== Demographics ==
Historical population
Census	Pop.	Note	%±
2010	835		—
2020	878		5.1%
U.S. Decennial Census; 1850–1900 1910; 1920 1930 1940; 1950 1960 1970; 1980 1990 2000; 2010 2020

Sand Springs first appeared as a census designated place in the 2010 U.S. census.

Sand Springs CDP, Texas – Racial and ethnic composition Note: the US Census treats Hispanic/Latino as an ethnic category. This table excludes Latinos from the racial categories and assigns them to a separate category. Hispanics/Latinos may be of any race.
Race / Ethnicity (NH = Non-Hispanic)	Pop 2010	Pop 2020	% 2010	% 2020
White alone (NH)	664	569	79.52%	64.81%
Black or African American alone (NH)	2	2	0.24%	0.23%
Native American or Alaska Native alone (NH)	6	7	0.72%	0.80%
Asian alone (NH)	3	4	0.36%	0.46%
Native Hawaiian or Pacific Islander alone (NH)	0	0	0.00%	0.00%
Other race alone (NH)	0	5	0.00%	0.57%
Mixed race or Multiracial (NH)	6	34	0.72%	3.87%
Hispanic or Latino (any race)	154	257	18.44%	29.27%
Total	835	878	100.00%	100.00%

== Education ==
It is in the Coahoma Independent School District.

All of Howard County is in the service area of Howard County Junior College District.
