= Ross City, Texas =

- Unincorporated community
- Location within Texas Location within the United States
- Coordinates: 32°05′55″N 101°17′38″W
- Country: United States
- State: Texas
- County: Howard
- Elevation: 2,634 ft (803 m)
- Time zone: UTC-6 (Central (CST))
  - Summer (DST): UTC-5 (CDT)
- Area code: 432
- GNIS feature ID: 2034914

Ross City is an unincorporated community in Howard County, Texas, United States.
