= Forsan, Texas =

- City
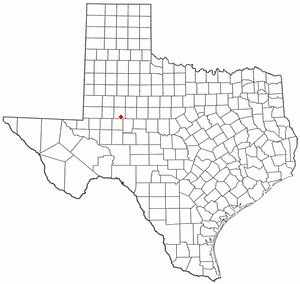
- Location of Forsan, Texas

- Coordinates: 32°6′34″N 101°21′56″W
- Country: United States
- State: Texas
- County: Howard

Government
  - Type: Local

Area
  - Total: 0.29 sq mi (0.75 km^{2})
  - Land: 0.29 sq mi (0.75 km^{2})
  - Water: 0 sq mi (0.00 km^{2})
- Elevation: 2,790 ft (850 m)

Population (2020)
  - Total: 225
  - Density: 780/sq mi (300/km^{2})
- Time zone: UTC-6 (Central (CST))
  - Summer (DST): UTC-5 (CDT)
- ZIP code: 79733
- Area code: 432
- FIPS code: 48-26640
- GNIS feature ID: 1336045
- Website: https://forsantx.gov/

Forsan is a city in Howard County, Texas, United States. The population was 225 at the 2020 census.

== Geography ==
Forsan is located in southern Howard County at 32°6′34″N 101°21′56″W (32.109359, –101.365531). It is situated along FM 461 in southeastern Howard County, about 14 miles (23 km) southeast of Big Spring.

According to the United States Census Bureau, the city has a total area of 0.29 square miles (0.75 km^{2}), all land.

== History ==
Forsan's development as a community dates back to the 1920s, when oil was discovered in the area. Oil companies began leasing local land and production from the first oil well began on November 9, 1925. On May 28, 1928, a town site on the ranch of Clayton Stewart was placed on the market. An office was set up and lots were sold at twenty-five dollars each. By December 1928, the growing community was known as Forsan. The name was derived from the fact that four paying oil sands were believed to be present in the area. Drillers would later discover that there were actually at least five sands present. A school and several businesses opened soon after. On March 5, 1929, Forsan's post office began operating. A true oil boomtown, Forsan's population had already reached 350 by 1931. The Great Depression's impact on Forsan was less significant than in other rural Texas towns. The population grew to 400 by 1936. That figure remained constant through the mid-1950s, but there was a decline in the number of businesses. The Elbow Common School District, based in the community of Elbow, consolidated with Forsan schools in 1960. On March 25, 1961, the first mayor and city council were elected following an earlier decision to incorporate the community. Forsan's population began to decline and by 1980, 239 people lived in the city. That number rose to 256 in 1990, but had declined to 226 as of 2000.

== Demographics ==
Historical population
Census	Pop.	Note	%±
1970	237		—
1980	239		0.8%
1990	256		7.1%
2000	226		−11.7%
2010	210		−7.1%
2020	225		7.1%
U.S. Decennial Census; 2020 Census

=== 2020 census ===
As of the 2020 census, Forsan had a population of 225. The median age was 40.4 years. 30.7% of residents were under the age of 18 and 12.9% of residents were 65 years of age or older. For every 100 females there were 116.3 males, and for every 100 females age 18 and over there were 100.0 males age 18 and over.

0.0% of residents lived in urban areas, while 100.0% lived in rural areas.

There were 81 households in Forsan, of which 53.1% had children under the age of 18 living in them. Of all households, 53.1% were married-couple households, 16.0% were households with a male householder and no spouse or partner present, and 29.6% were households with a female householder and no spouse or partner present. About 17.2% of all households were made up of individuals and 7.4% had someone living alone who was 65 years of age or older.

There were 92 housing units, of which 12.0% were vacant. The homeowner vacancy rate was 0.0% and the rental vacancy rate was 10.0%.

Racial composition as of the 2020 census
Race	Number	Percent
White	183	81.3%
Black or African American	1	0.4%
American Indian and Alaska Native	4	1.8%
Asian	0	0.0%
Native Hawaiian and Other Pacific Islander	0	0.0%
Some other race	7	3.1%
Two or more races	30	13.3%
Hispanic or Latino (of any race)	51	22.7%

=== 2000 census ===
As of the census of 2000, there were 226 people, 84 households, and 69 families residing in the city. The population density was 778.8 inhabitants per square mile (300.7/km^{2}). There were 96 housing units at an average density of 330.8 per square mile (127.7/km^{2}). The racial makeup of the city was 97.79% White, 0.44% Native American, 0.44% from other races, and 1.33% from two or more races. Hispanic or Latino of any race were 12.39% of the population.

There were 84 households, out of which 41.7% had children under the age of 18 living with them, 66.7% were married couples living together, 11.9% had a female householder with no husband present, and 16.7% were non-families. 16.7% of all households were made up of individuals, and 8.3% had someone living alone who was 65 years of age or older. The average household size was 2.69 and the average family size was 2.96.

In the city, the population was spread out, with 31.9% under the age of 18, 4.9% from 18 to 24, 25.2% from 25 to 44, 23.5% from 45 to 64, and 14.6% who were 65 years of age or older. The median age was 37 years. For every 100 females, there were 94.8 males. For every 100 females age 18 and over, there were 97.4 males.

The median income for a household in the city was $36,000, and the median income for a family was $38,750. Males had a median income of $36,250 versus $17,250 for females. The per capita income for the city was $17,103. About 11.5% of families and 16.4% of the population were below the poverty line, including 30.4% of those under the age of eighteen and none of those 65 or over.

== Education ==
Forsan is served by the Forsan Independent School District

All of Howard County is in the service area of Howard County Junior College District.

== Climate ==
According to the Köppen climate classification system, Forsan has a semiarid climate, BSk on climate maps.
