= Forsan Independent School District =

School district in Texas

The Forsan Independent School District is a public school district based in Forsan, Texas (USA). In addition to Forsan, the district serves the community of Elbow and rural areas in southeastern Howard County. The district also includes small portion of southwestern Mitchell County.

Forsan's first school opened in 1928. In 1946, the Otis Chalk school consolidated with Forsan. The Elbow Common School District consolidated with Forsan in 1960.

In 2009, the school district was rated "recognized" by the Texas Education Agency.

== Schools ==
Forsan ISD operates two schools, both in the city of Forsan.

- Forsan Jr./Sr. High School (Forsan; Grades 6-12)
- Forsan Elementary School (Forsan; Grades PK-5)
