= Centerview, Kansas =

Unincorporated community in Edwards County, Kansas

Coordinates: 37.815°N 99.269°W

Centerview is an unincorporated community in Edwards County, Kansas, United States.

== History ==
A post office was opened in Centerview in 1917, and remained in operation until it was discontinued in 1959.
