= Coahoma Independent School District =

School district in Texas

Coahoma Independent School District is a public school district based in Coahoma, Texas (USA), founded in 1899 in order to educate the children of local pioneers and settlers. The district covers eastern Howard and western Mitchell counties.

In 2009, the school district was rated "academically acceptable" by the Texas Education Agency.

== Schools ==
Coahoma ISD has three schools:

- Coahoma High School (Grades 9-12)
- Coahoma Junior High School (Grades 6-8)
- Coahoma Elementary School (Grades PK-5).

== Sports ==
- Coahoma has a long history of accomplishments including a 3A Div 2 State Championship in softball
