= Coahoma, Texas =

- Town
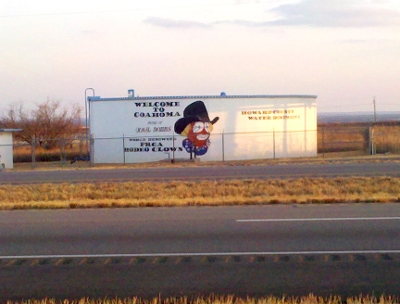
- A water tank depicting Coahoma Justice of the Peace and well-known rodeo clown Quail Dobbs, located on Interstate 20 near Coahoma

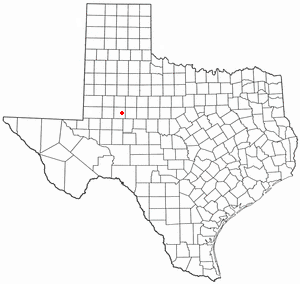
- Location of Coahoma, Texas

- Coordinates: 32°17′47″N 101°18′17″W
- Country: United States
- State: Texas
- County: Howard

Area
  - Total: 1.23 sq mi (3.19 km^{2})
  - Land: 1.23 sq mi (3.19 km^{2})
  - Water: 0 sq mi (0.00 km^{2})
- Elevation: 2,411 ft (735 m)

Population (2020)
  - Total: 945
  - Density: 767/sq mi (296/km^{2})
- Time zone: UTC-6 (Central (CST))
  - Summer (DST): UTC-5 (CDT)
- ZIP code: 79511
- Area code: Area code 432
- FIPS code: 48-15700
- GNIS feature ID: 1333021
- Website: https://cityofcoahoma.org/

Coahoma (/kəˈhoʊmə/ kə-HOH-mə) is a town in Howard County, Texas, United States. The population was 945 at the 2020 census, 817 at the 2010 census, and 932 at the 2000 census.

== Geography ==
Coahoma is located in eastern Howard County at 32°17′47″N 101°18′17″W (32.296443, –101.304738). Interstate 20 runs through the southern part of the city, with access from Exit 188. I-20 leads west 10 miles (16 km) to Big Spring, the county seat, and east 27 miles (43 km) to Colorado City.

According to the United States Census Bureau, Coahoma has a total area of 1.2 square miles (3.1 km^{2}), all land.

== Demographics ==
Historical population
Census	Pop.	Note	%±
1930	620		—
1940	574		−7.4%
1950	802		39.7%
1960	1,239		54.5%
1970	1,158		−6.5%
1980	1,069		−7.7%
1990	1,133		6.0%
2000	932		−17.7%
2010	817		−12.3%
2020	945		15.7%
U.S. Decennial Census

=== 2020 census ===
Coahoma racial composition (NH = Non-Hispanic) (Note: Note: the US Census treats Hispanic/Latino as an ethnic category. This table excludes Latinos from the racial categories and assigns them to a separate category. Hispanics/Latinos can be of any race.)
Race	Number	Percentage
White (NH)	573	60.63%
Black or African American (NH)	6	0.63%
Native American or Alaska Native (NH)	4	0.42%
Asian (NH)	8	0.85%
Some Other Race (NH)	2	0.21%
Mixed/Multi-Racial (NH)	24	2.54%
Hispanic or Latino	328	34.71%
Total	945	

As of the 2020 United States census, there were 945 people, 332 households, and 223 families residing in the town.

=== 2000 census ===
As of the census of 2000, 932 people, 354 households, and 261 families resided in the town. The population density was 774.9 inhabitants per square mile (299.2/km^{2}). The 388 housing units averaged 322.6 per square mile (124.8/km^{2}). The racial makeup of the town was 90.77% White, 0.54% African American, 0.32% Native American, 0.11% Asian, 6.97% from other races, and 1.29% from two or more races. Hispanics or Latinos of any race were 23.82% of the population.

Of the 354 households, 37.9% had children under the age of 18 living with them, 58.2% were married couples living together, 11.6% had a female householder with no husband present, and 26.0% were not families; 24.6% of all households were made up of individuals, and 15.3% had someone living alone who was 65 years of age or older. The average household size was 2.63 and the average family size was 3.13.

In the town, the population was distributed as 29.9% under the age of 18, 7.4% from 18 to 24, 26.3% from 25 to 44, 21.6% from 45 to 64, and 14.8% who were 65 years of age or older. The median age was 37 years. For every 100 females, there were 94.6 males. For every 100 females age 18 and over, there were 87.6 males.

The median income for a household in the town was $35,962, and for a family was $41,094. Males had a median income of $30,625 versus $19,167 for females. The per capita income for the town was $14,013. About 7.7% of families and 8.9% of the population were below the poverty line, including 8.7% of those under age 18 and 7.8% of those age 65 or over.

== Education ==
The town is served by the Coahoma Independent School District.

All of Howard County is in the service area of Howard County Junior College District.
