= Elbow, Texas =

- Unincorporated community
- Location within Texas Location within the United States
- Coordinates: 32°9′37″N 101°30′43″W
- Country: United States
- State: Texas
- County: Howard
- Time zone: UTC-6 (Central (CST))
  - Summer (DST): UTC-5 (CDT)

Elbow is an unincorporated community in Howard County, Texas, United States of America. It lies 8 miles (13 km) by road south of Big Spring.

== Geography ==
Elbow is located at 32°9’37” North, 101°30’43” West (32.1604012, -101.5120686).

The elevation is 2,549 feet (777 m).

== Education ==
Elbow is served by the Forsan Independent School District.
