= Howard County, Texas =

County in Texas, United States

- County
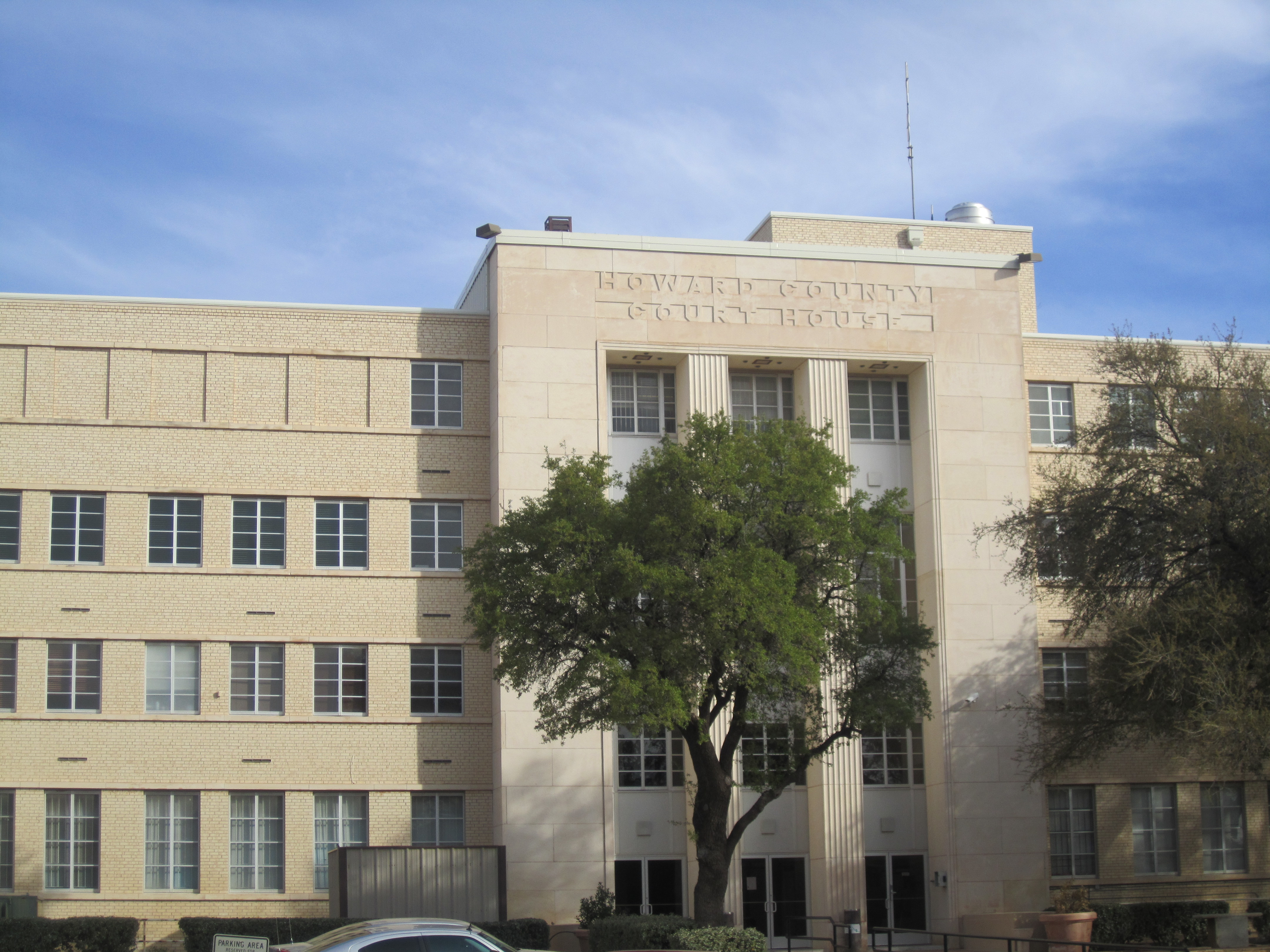
- Howard County Court House in downtown Big Spring

- Location within the U.S. state of Texas
- Coordinates: 32°19′N 101°26′W
- Country: United States
- State: Texas
- Founded: 1882
- Named for: Volney E. Howard
- Seat: Big Spring
- Largest city: Big Spring

Area
  - Total: 904 sq mi (2,340 km^{2})
  - Land: 901 sq mi (2,330 km^{2})
  - Water: 3 sq mi (7.8 km^{2}) 0.4%

Population (2020)
  - Total: 34,860
  - Estimate (2025): 30,504 ▼
  - Density: 34/sq mi (13.1/km^{2})
- Time zone: UTC−6 (Central)
  - Summer (DST): UTC−5 (CDT)
- Congressional district: 19th
- Website: www.co.howard.tx.us

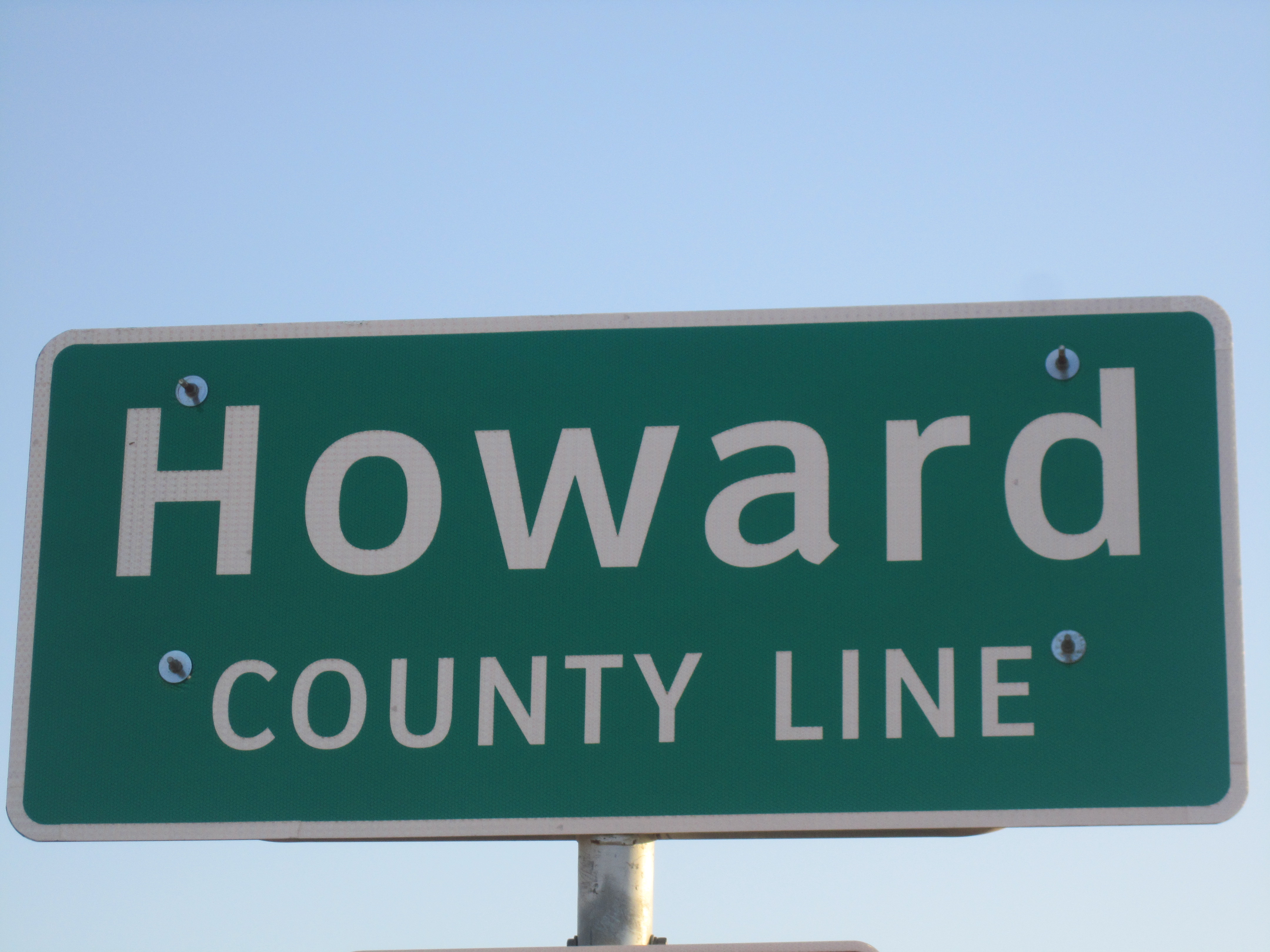

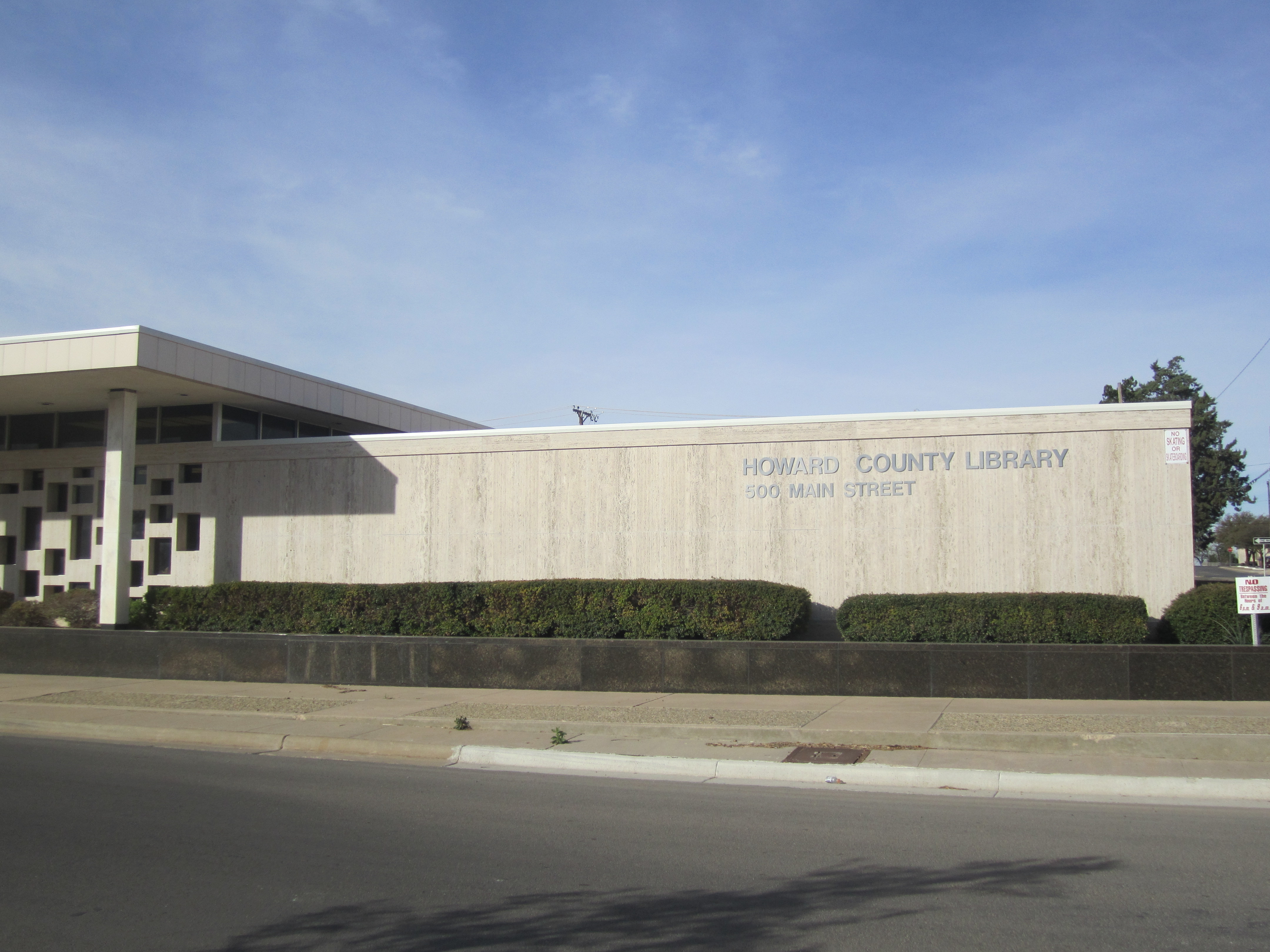
Howard County Library in Big Spring

Howard County is a county located in the U.S. state of Texas. At the 2020 census, its population was 34,860. Its county seat is Big Spring. The county was created in 1876 and organized in 1882. It is named for Volney E. Howard, a U.S. Congressman from Texas.

Howard County is included in the Big Spring, Texas micropolitan statistical area.

== Geography ==
According to the United States Census Bureau, the county has a total area of 904.205 square miles (2,341.88 km^{2}), of which 900.791 square miles (2,333.04 km^{2}) are land and 3.414 square miles (8.84 km^{2}) (0.4%) are covered by water.

Howard County is located at the boundary between the Llano Estacado to the north and the Edwards Plateau to the south. Beals Creek, a tributary of the Colorado River, flows through the center of Big Spring and divides these two major physiographic regions.

=== Major highways ===
- Interstate 20
- Interstate 20 Business
- U.S. Highway 87
- State Highway 176
- State Highway 350
- Farm to Market Road 669
- Farm to Market Road 700

=== Adjacent counties ===
- Borden County (north)
- Mitchell County (east)
- Sterling County (southeast)
- Glasscock County (south)
- Martin County (west)
- Dawson County (northwest)
- Scurry County (northeast)

== Demographics ==
Historical population
| Census | Pop. | Note | %± |
|---|---|---|---|
| 1880 | 50 | | — |
| 1890 | 1,210 | | 2,320.0% |
| 1900 | 2,528 | | 108.9% |
| 1910 | 8,881 | | 251.3% |
| 1920 | 6,962 | | −21.6% |
| 1930 | 22,888 | | 228.8% |
| 1940 | 20,990 | | −8.3% |
| 1950 | 26,722 | | 27.3% |
| 1960 | 40,139 | | 50.2% |
| 1970 | 37,796 | | −5.8% |
| 1980 | 33,142 | | −12.3% |
| 1990 | 32,343 | | −2.4% |
| 2000 | 33,627 | | 4.0% |
| 2010 | 35,012 | | 4.1% |
| 2020 | 34,860 | | −0.4% |
| 2025 (est.) | 30,504 | ▼ | −12.5% |
U.S. Decennial Census; 1850–2010; 2010–2020

=== Racial and ethnic composition ===
Howard County, Texas – Racial and ethnic composition Note: the US Census treats Hispanic/Latino as an ethnic category. This table excludes Latinos from the racial categories and assigns them to a separate category. Hispanics/Latinos may be of any race.
| Race / Ethnicity (NH = Non-Hispanic) | Pop 2000 | Pop 2010 | Pop 2020 | % 2000 | % 2010 | % 2020 |
|---|---|---|---|---|---|---|
| White alone (NH) | 19,096 | 18,801 | 15,672 | 56.79% | 53.70% | 44.96% |
| Black or African American alone (NH) | 1,292 | 2,079 | 1,520 | 3.84% | 5.94% | 4.36% |
| Native American or Alaska Native alone (NH) | 122 | 220 | 211 | 0.36% | 0.63% | 0.61% |
| Asian alone (NH) | 196 | 256 | 386 | 0.58% | 0.73% | 1.11% |
| Pacific Islander alone (NH) | 1 | 13 | 12 | 0.00% | 0.04% | 0.03% |
| Other race alone (NH) | 8 | 76 | 68 | 0.02% | 0.22% | 0.20% |
| Mixed race or Multiracial (NH) | 315 | 312 | 817 | 0.94% | 0.89% | 2.34% |
| Hispanic or Latino (any race) | 12,597 | 13,255 | 16,174 | 37.46% | 37.86% | 46.40% |
| Total | 33,627 | 35,012 | 34,860 | 100.00% | 100.00% | 100.00% |

=== 2020 census ===
As of the 2020 census, the county had a population of 34,860, 11,674 households, and 7,739 families. The median age was 37.7 years, 22.9% of residents were under the age of 18, 5.8% were under the age of 5, and 14.4% were 65 years of age or older. For every 100 females there were 129.8 males, and for every 100 females age 18 and over there were 137.6 males age 18 and over.

Of the 11,674 households, 34.3% had children under the age of 18 living in them, 44.4% were married-couple households, 21.5% were households with a male householder and no spouse or partner present, and 27.3% were households with a female householder and no spouse or partner present. About 28.9% of all households were made up of individuals and 11.9% had someone living alone who was 65 years of age or older.

There were 14,000 housing units, of which 16.6% were vacant. Among occupied housing units, 65.5% were owner-occupied and 34.5% were renter-occupied. The homeowner vacancy rate was 2.4% and the rental vacancy rate was 19.5%. The racial makeup of the county was 67.9% White, 4.9% Black or African American, 1.2% American Indian and Alaska Native, 1.2% Asian, 0.1% Native Hawaiian and Pacific Islander, 10.8% from some other race, and 14.0% from two or more races. Hispanic or Latino residents of any race comprised 46.4% of the population.

83.1% of residents lived in urban areas, while 16.9% lived in rural areas.

=== 2000 census ===
As of the 2000 census, there were 33,627 people, 11,389 households and 7,949 families residing in the county. The population density was 37 people per square mile (14 people/km^{2}). There were 13,589 housing units at an average density of 15 units per square mile (5.8/km^{2}). The racial makeup of the county was 80.14% White, 4.13% Black or African American, 0.59% Native American, 0.59% Asian, 0.01% Pacific Islander, 12.43% from other races, and 2.10% from two or more races. 37.46% of the population were Hispanic or Latino of any race.

There were 11,389 households, of which 32.80% had children under the age of 18 living with them, 53.30% were married couples living together, 12.20% had a female householder with no husband present, and 30.20% were non-families. 26.80% of all households were made up of individuals, and 13.20% had someone living alone who was 65 years of age or older. The average household size was 2.53 and the average family size was 3.07.

24.20% of the population were under the age of 18, 9.00% from 18 to 24, 30.90% from 25 to 44, 21.30% from 45 to 64, and 14.60% who were 65 years of age or older. The median age was 36 years. For every 100 females there were 118.00 males. For every 100 females age 18 and over, there were 122.50 males.

The median household income was $30,805 and the median family income was $37,262. Males had a median income of $28,971 and females $21,390. The per capita income was $15,027. About 14.50% of families and 18.60% of the population were below the poverty line, including 24.70% of those under age 18 and 15.50% of those age 65 or over.

== Media ==
The county is served by a daily newspaper, local radio stations KBST (AM), KBST-FM, KBTS (FM), KBYG (AM), nearby stations KBXJ (FM), KPET (AM) and KWDC (FM), and the various Midland and Odessa radio and TV stations.

== Communities ==
=== Cities ===
- Big Spring (county seat)
- Forsan

=== Towns ===
- Coahoma

=== Census-designated place ===
- Sand Springs

=== Unincorporated communities ===
- Elbow
- Knott
- Ross City
- Vealmoor

=== Ghost town ===
- Soash

== Politics ==
From 1912 through 1964, Howard County voters, in common with the Solid South, voted predominantly for the Democratic candidate in presidential elections. Since 1980, the trend has swung to voting chiefly for the Republican candidate.

United States presidential election results for Howard County, Texas
| Year | Republican | | Democratic | | Third party(ies) | |
| Year | No. | % | No. | % | No. | % |
|---|---|---|---|---|---|---|
| 1912 | 22 | 3.14% | 530 | 75.61% | 149 | 21.26% |
| 1916 | 30 | 3.42% | 747 | 85.18% | 100 | 11.40% |
| 1920 | 107 | 11.80% | 703 | 77.51% | 97 | 10.69% |
| 1924 | 186 | 12.85% | 1,100 | 76.02% | 161 | 11.13% |
| 1928 | 812 | 54.86% | 665 | 44.93% | 3 | 0.20% |
| 1932 | 149 | 5.15% | 2,733 | 94.40% | 13 | 0.45% |
| 1936 | 230 | 6.90% | 3,094 | 92.86% | 8 | 0.24% |
| 1940 | 367 | 7.80% | 4,329 | 92.05% | 7 | 0.15% |
| 1944 | 334 | 7.71% | 3,588 | 82.79% | 412 | 9.51% |
| 1948 | 561 | 11.10% | 4,179 | 82.72% | 312 | 6.18% |
| 1952 | 3,412 | 41.60% | 4,779 | 58.27% | 11 | 0.13% |
| 1956 | 3,051 | 40.30% | 4,506 | 59.52% | 14 | 0.18% |
| 1960 | 3,403 | 40.83% | 4,844 | 58.12% | 88 | 1.06% |
| 1964 | 3,272 | 34.93% | 6,083 | 64.94% | 12 | 0.13% |
| 1968 | 3,812 | 36.30% | 3,897 | 37.11% | 2,792 | 26.59% |
| 1972 | 7,343 | 72.85% | 2,714 | 26.92% | 23 | 0.23% |
| 1976 | 4,899 | 40.92% | 6,984 | 58.34% | 89 | 0.74% |
| 1980 | 6,658 | 58.86% | 4,451 | 39.35% | 203 | 1.79% |
| 1984 | 7,519 | 64.31% | 4,115 | 35.20% | 57 | 0.49% |
| 1988 | 6,024 | 57.28% | 4,445 | 42.26% | 48 | 0.46% |
| 1992 | 5,129 | 47.17% | 3,735 | 34.35% | 2,009 | 18.48% |
| 1996 | 5,007 | 50.80% | 3,732 | 37.86% | 1,118 | 11.34% |
| 2000 | 6,668 | 69.84% | 2,744 | 28.74% | 136 | 1.42% |
| 2004 | 7,480 | 73.33% | 2,663 | 26.11% | 58 | 0.57% |
| 2008 | 7,029 | 72.55% | 2,545 | 26.27% | 115 | 1.19% |
| 2012 | 6,453 | 74.22% | 2,110 | 24.27% | 132 | 1.52% |
| 2016 | 6,637 | 76.09% | 1,770 | 20.29% | 316 | 3.62% |
| 2020 | 8,054 | 78.64% | 2,069 | 20.20% | 118 | 1.15% |
| 2024 | 7,817 | 81.08% | 1,759 | 18.24% | 65 | 0.67% |

United States Senate election results for Howard County, Texas1
| Year | Republican | | Democratic | | Third party(ies) | |
| Year | No. | % | No. | % | No. | % |
|---|---|---|---|---|---|---|
| 2024 | 7,388 | 77.67% | 1,895 | 19.92% | 229 | 2.41% |

United States Senate election results for Howard County, Texas2
| Year | Republican | | Democratic | | Third party(ies) | |
| Year | No. | % | No. | % | No. | % |
|---|---|---|---|---|---|---|
| 2020 | 7,854 | 78.14% | 1,959 | 19.49% | 238 | 2.37% |

Texas Gubernatorial election results for Howard County
| Year | Republican | | Democratic | | Third party(ies) | |
| Year | No. | % | No. | % | No. | % |
|---|---|---|---|---|---|---|
| 2022 | 5,367 | 81.71% | 1,077 | 16.40% | 124 | 1.89% |

== Education ==
School districts include:

- Big Spring Independent School District
- Borden County Independent School District
- Coahoma Independent School District
- Forsan Independent School District
- Sands Consolidated Independent School District
- Stanton Independent School District

All of Howard County is in the service area of Howard County Junior College District.

== See also ==
- National Register of Historic Places listings in Howard County, Texas
- Recorded Texas Historic Landmarks in Howard County
