= Tornado outbreak sequence of May 22–26, 2016 =

Tornado outbreak in the Central United States from May 22–26, 2016

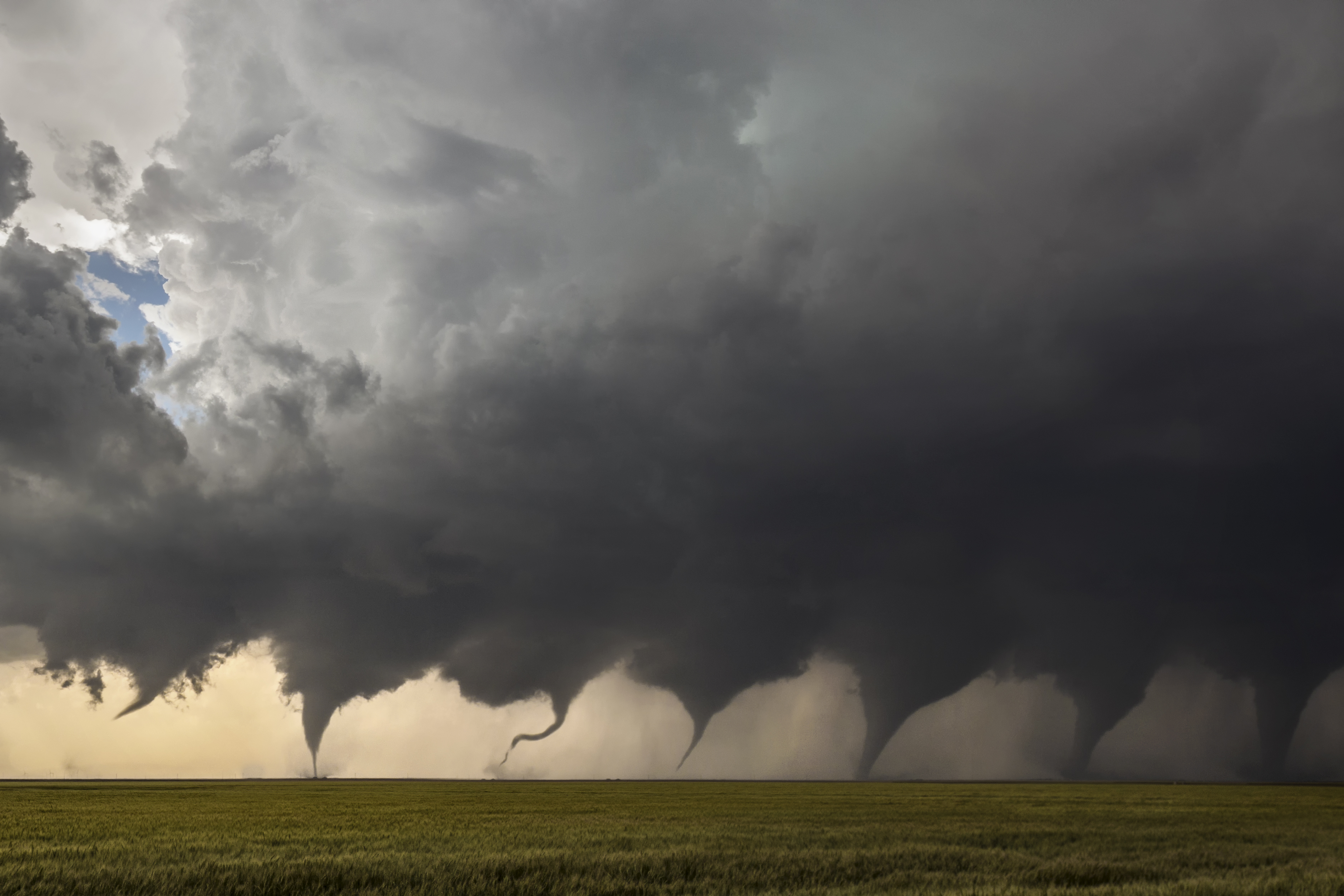
- Photomontage of an EF3 tornado forming near Minneola, Kansas on May 24.

Meteorological history
- Duration: May 22–26, 2016

Tornado outbreak
- Tornadoes: 98
- Max. rating: EF4 tornado
- Duration: 4 days, 3 hours, 19 minutes
- Highest winds: Tornadic – 180 mph (290 km/h) (Chapman, Kansas EF4 on May 25)*; *A 201 mph (323 km/h) gust was measured by DOW Mobile Radar from an EF2 in Dodge City, Kansas

Overall effects
- Fatalities: 0
- Injuries: ≥11
- Damage: $1.3 billion (2016 USD)
- Areas affected: High Plains, parts of the Midwest and Ohio Valley
- Part of the tornado outbreaks of 2016

An extended period of significant tornado activity affected the Central United States in late May 2016. This outbreak sequence came less than two weeks after another damaging tornado outbreak that affected similar areas. The most prolific day was May 24 when 44 tornadoes touched down with at least 12 of them spawned by an intense, long-tracked supercell near Dodge City, Kansas. The strongest tornado from this outbreak was a violent EF4 tornado on May 25 that caused severe damage near Solomon, Abilene, and Chapman, Kansas, injuring eight. Overall, 98 tornadoes were confirmed.

== Meteorological synopsis ==
During the week of May 22–27, a southwards dip in the jet stream occurred in the West near Colorado, with favorable thermodynamics advecting northwards and setting the potential for a tornado outbreak. In the early afternoon of May 22, an Enhanced risk was issued by the Storm Prediction Center for extreme southwestern Kansas, the Oklahoma Panhandle, and northern Texas. Numerous tornadoes touched down along the dryline that evening, with the strongest tornadoes touching down in Texas. This included a large, rain-wrapped EF3 tornado that destroyed homes and vehicles near Big Spring. Another EF3 tornado destroyed oil pump jacks near Garden City, while two EF2 tornadoes in the same general area snapped numerous trees and power poles and destroyed, damaged additional pump jacks, and destroyed a mobile home. Less widespread tornado activity occurred on May 23, with mainly scattered weak tornadoes occurring across central and southern Plains. However, a large nighttime wedge tornado caused EF3 damage to metal power poles near Turkey, Texas that night.

A significant outbreak of strong tornadoes affected Kansas on May 24. A single cyclic supercell produced about a dozen highly visible tornadoes near Dodge City, with several reports of multiple tornadoes on the ground simultaneously. A total of five EF3 tornadoes and three EF2 tornadoes were confirmed in western Kansas that evening, affecting rural areas near Dodge City, Jetmore, Ness City, Lewis, and Kinsley. These tornadoes caused extensive damage to trees, power poles, vehicles, farm machinery, and a few homes. Scattered weak tornadoes were also observed across other parts of Kansas and other states as well. Less significant activity was expected on May 25, and only a few tornadoes occurred, though this included a half-mile wide EF4 wedge tornado that tracked from near Solomon to east of Chapman, Kansas. This violent tornado obliterated farm homes, debarked trees, bent railroad tracks, and mangled farm machinery and vehicles beyond recognition, though only eight minor injuries occurred along the path. Another significant outbreak of tornadoes occurred was expected to occur across Kansas on May 26, and a Moderate Risk with a 15% hatched risk area for tornadoes was issued by the Storm Prediction center. Despite this, early initiation of storms combined with an unfavorable wind profile prevented a significant outbreak from occurring. However, a high-end EF1 tornado caused considerable damage in Bryan, Texas, while EF1 and EF2 tornadoes occurred simultaneously near Navasota, resulting in heavy damage. Despite producing numerous strong to violent tornadoes, this outbreak sequence mainly affected rural areas, resulting in no fatalities and few injuries. A total of 98 tornadoes were confirmed as a result of the outbreak sequence.

== Confirmed tornadoes ==
Confirmed tornadoes by Enhanced Fujita rating
| EFU | EF0 | EF1 | EF2 | EF3 | EF4 | EF5 | Total |
|---|---|---|---|---|---|---|---|
| 4 | 52 | 24 | 9 | 8 | 1 | 0 | 98 |

- Note: Four tornadoes were confirmed, but a lack of damage indicators prevented a rating on the Enhanced Fujita scale.

=== May 22 event ===
List of confirmed tornadoes – Sunday, May 22, 2016 (Note: All dates are based on the local time zone where the tornado touched down; however, all times are in Coordinated Universal Time for consistency.)
| EF# | Location | County / Parish | State | Start Coord. | Time (UTC) | Path length | Max width | Damage (2016 USD) |
|---|---|---|---|---|---|---|---|---|
| EF0 | Kennewick | Benton | WA | 46.2°N 119.17°W | 0650–0652 | 0.15 mi (0.24 km) | 100 yd (91 m) | $20,000 |
| EF0 | Members of the public recorded a brief tornado. | | | | | | | |
| EF0 | NW of Howardwick | Donley | TX | 35.0616°N 100.9416°W | 2230–2231 | 0.36 mi (0.58 km) | 25 yd (23 m) | $0 |
| EF0 | Small tree limbs were broken by this brief tornado. | | | | | | | |
| EF1 | NW of Howardwick | Donley | TX | 35.062°N 100.9521°W | 2239–2248 | 1.05 mi (1.69 km) | 75 yd (69 m) | $0 |
| EF1 | Trees were snapped or uprooted and a power pole was broken at its rotten base by this large cone tornado. | | | | | | | |
| EF3 | SSW of Knott to WNW of Elbow | Howard | TX | 32.25°N 101.6411°W | 2313–0000 | 4.01 mi (6.45 km) | 500 yd (460 m) | $75,000 |
| EF3 | This large rain-wrapped tornado occurred to the west of Big Spring. A well-constructed home had its roof completely destroyed and multiple exterior walls collapsed, and two other homes had large sections of their roofs removed. An oil pumpjack was overturned, a car was thrown 100 yards (91 m), and another car was moved several feet. Two poles were bent, wooden power poles were snapped, and a small barn suffered major loss of roof panels. Trees were damaged along the path as well, with trees partially debarked, trunks snapped, and trees uprooted. | | | | | | | |
| EF0 | WNW of Artas | Campbell | SD | 45.9277°N 99.9445°W | 2330–2335 | 0.28 mi (0.45 km) | 30 yd (27 m) | $0 |
| EF0 | A brief landspout tornado touched down in an open field, causing no damage. | | | | | | | |
| EF0 | SE of Waka | Ochiltree | TX | 36.1261°N 100.9783°W | 2344–2351 | 2.5 mi (4.0 km) | 75 yd (69 m) | Unknown |
| EF0 | A pivot irrigation system was damaged. | | | | | | | |
| EF2 | S of Lakeview to W of Estelline | Hall | TX | 34.66°N 100.7°W | 2344–2359 | 6.59 mi (10.61 km) | 600 yd (550 m) | $150,000 |
| EF2 | This large but intermittent multiple-vortex tornado passed near the rural community of Plaska, snapping numerous trees and power poles. Several pivot irrigation systems were flipped as well. | | | | | | | |
| EF0 | E of Stanton | Howard | TX | 32.1571°N 101.5585°W | 2351–2359 | 1.52 mi (2.45 km) | 100 yd (91 m) | $0 |
| EF0 | An anticyclonic tornado associated with the Big Spring EF3 tornado remained over open fields, causing no damage. | | | | | | | |
| EF1 | SSE of Farnsworth | Ochiltree | TX | 36.134°N 100.926°W | 2357–0005 | 1.5 mi (2.4 km) | 500 yd (460 m) | Unknown |
| EF1 | A barn was destroyed, and power lines and two large sections of pivot irrigation were damaged by this large multiple-vortex wedge tornado. | | | | | | | |
| EF1 | SSE of Farnsworth | Ochiltree | TX | 36.1536°N 100.9021°W | 0004–0007 | 1.5 mi (2.4 km) | 400 yd (370 m) | Unknown |
| EF1 | Trees were snapped, power lines were damaged, and pivot irrigation systems were flipped. | | | | | | | |
| EF1 | N of Deerfield | Kearny | KS | 38.0628°N 101.1347°W | 0012–0021 | 2.82 mi (4.54 km) | 75 yd (69 m) | $0 |
| EF1 | Tornado moved along an unusual northwesterly path, producing little damage. | | | | | | | |
| EF1 | S of Perryton | Ochiltree | TX | 36.1468°N 100.8636°W | 0015–0020 | 2.4 mi (3.9 km) | 75 yd (69 m) | Unknown |
| EF1 | Tree limbs were snapped, a power pole was damaged, and debris was scattered in a field. | | | | | | | |
| EF0 | S of Elbow | Howard | TX | 32.1076°N 101.48°W | 0017–0028 | 2.29 mi (3.69 km) | 100 yd (91 m) | $0 |
| EF0 | Tornado remained over open country, causing no damage. | | | | | | | |
| EF2 | NW of Sparks | Todd | SD | 43.0301°N 100.4275°W | 0025–0035 | 4.64 mi (7.47 km) | 100 yd (91 m) | $10,000 |
| EF2 | Eight to ten power poles were snapped and several large trees were heavily damaged. | | | | | | | |
| EF0 | NNW of Wolf | Kearny | KS | 38.1383°N 101.1782°W | 0029–0037 | 4.8 mi (7.7 km) | 75 yd (69 m) | $0 |
| EF0 | Tornado formed after the previous Kearny County tornado dissipated, producing no damage as it moved along a northwesterly path over open fields. | | | | | | | |
| EF1 | SW of Winner | Tripp | SD | 43.2654°N 100.0451°W | 0035–0037 | 0.68 mi (1.09 km) | 20 yd (18 m) | $25,000 |
| EF1 | A house sustained roof and siding damage, a pole shed was destroyed, several livestock trailers were blown several yards, and a few trees were downed. | | | | | | | |
| EF0 | SW of Elbow | Glasscock | TX | 32.08°N 101.5654°W | 0038–0040 | 0.49 mi (0.79 km) | 50 yd (46 m) | $0 |
| EF0 | A brief tornado touched down over open country, causing no damage. | | | | | | | |
| EFU | NW of Canadian | Ochiltree | TX | 36.1°N 100.8°W | 0049–0051 | 0.25 mi (0.40 km) | 50 yd (46 m) | $0 |
| EFU | A rain-wrapped cone tornado remained over open grassland, causing no damage. | | | | | | | |
| EF2 | N of Garden City | Glasscock | TX | 32.0391°N 101.5283°W | 0055–0107 | 3.05 mi (4.91 km) | 200 yd (180 m) | $15,000 |
| EF2 | 14 power poles were snapped about 5 feet (1.5 m) above the ground and a metal building sustained a loss of roof panels. | | | | | | | |
| EF1 | W of Friend to WSW of Shallow Water | Kearny, Wichita, Scott | KS | 38.2611°N 101.1868°W | 0110–0144 | 6.78 mi (10.91 km) | 900 yd (820 m) | $0 |
| EF1 | Large wedge tornado moved along an erratic path through open fields, causing little damage. The tornado was likely capable of producing EF3 or stronger damage based on video evidence. | | | | | | | |
| EF3 | N of Garden City | Glasscock | TX | 31.9235°N 101.5261°W | 0142–0154 | 3.71 mi (5.97 km) | 200 yd (180 m) | $45,000 |
| EF3 | A large 640 model oil pumpjack was overturned, indicative of EF3 strength winds. Tree branches were broken along other sections of the path. | | | | | | | |
| EF0 | NW of Canadian | Ochiltree | TX | 36.07°N 100.55°W | 0145–0146 | 0.1 mi (0.16 km) | 50 yd (46 m) | $0 |
| EF0 | A tornado moved over open grassland, producing no observable damage. | | | | | | | |
| EF2 | NW of Garden City | Glasscock | TX | 31.8922°N 101.4981°W | 0156–0202 | 1.9 mi (3.1 km) | 150 yd (140 m) | $107,000 |
| EF2 | A single-wide mobile home was rolled and destroyed, another mobile home sustained roof damage, and an oil pumpjack was overturned. A metal barn had its roof purlins buckled and trees had their trunks snapped as well. | | | | | | | |
| EF1 | SW of Shallow Water | Scott | KS | 38.2837°N 101.0218°W | 0200–0220 | 6.4 mi (10.3 km) | 100 yd (91 m) | $0 |
| EF1 | A pivot irrigation sprinkler was damaged by the tornado. | | | | | | | |
| EF0 | SSW of Garden City | Glasscock | TX | 31.859°N 101.4934°W | 0202–0208 | 1.4 mi (2.3 km) | 100 yd (91 m) | $0 |
| EF0 | Short-lived tornado remained over open country, causing no damage. | | | | | | | |
| EF0 | N of Ypsilanti | Stutsman | ND | 46.852°N 98.5419°W | 0210–0212 | 1.05 mi (1.69 km) | 20 yd (18 m) | $0 |
| EF0 | Brief tornado remained over open fields, causing no damage. | | | | | | | |

=== May 23 event ===
List of confirmed tornadoes – Monday, May 23, 2016
| EF# | Location | County / Parish | State | Start Coord. | Time (UTC) | Path length | Max width | Damage (2016 USD) |
|---|---|---|---|---|---|---|---|---|
| EF0 | N of Juniata | Adams | NE | 40.6384°N 98.4881°W | 1937–1940 | 0.09 mi (0.14 km) | 50 yd (46 m) | $0 |
| EF0 | Brief landspout tornado in an open field caused no damage. | | | | | | | |
| EF0 | N of Granville | Sioux | IA | 43.01°N 95.87°W | 2141–2142 | 0.05 mi (0.080 km) | 25 yd (23 m) | $0 |
| EF0 | A brief landspout tornado caused no damage. | | | | | | | |
| EF0 | NNW of Woodward | Woodward | OK | 36.5066°N 99.4119°W | 0125–0141 | 2.7 mi (4.3 km) | 400 yd (370 m) | $10,000 |
| EF0 | Large but weak tornado moved slowly along a meandering intermittent path, damaging two outbuildings. The University of Massachusetts X-Pol Doppler radar measured EF0 strength winds within the tornado. | | | | | | | |
| EFU | SSE of Selman | Harper | OK | 36.617°N 99.43°W | 0224–0234 | 2 mi (3.2 km) | 50 yd (46 m) | $0 |
| EFU | Tornado remained over open country and caused no damage. The University of Massachusetts X-Pol Doppler radar measured EF0 strength winds within the tornado. | | | | | | | |
| EF3 | ESE of Turkey | Motley, Hall | TX | 34.3068°N 100.7142°W | 0230–0306 | 9.99 mi (16.08 km) | 880 yd (800 m) | $150,000 |
| EF3 | A strong wedge tornado bent several large steel electrical poles to the ground. Trees were also uprooted. The tornado moved along an unusual northwestward path. | | | | | | | |

=== May 24 event ===
List of confirmed tornadoes – Tuesday, May 24, 2016
| EF# | Location | County / Parish | State | Start Coord. | Time (UTC) | Path length | Max width | Damage (2016 USD) |
|---|---|---|---|---|---|---|---|---|
| EF1 | NW of Republic | Marquette | MI | 46.445°N 88.1106°W | 1821–1833 | 3.78 mi (6.08 km) | 200 yd (180 m) | $10,000 |
| EF1 | Numerous large trees were downed. | | | | | | | |
| EF1 | S of Greenwood Reservoir | Marquette | MI | 46.4303°N 87.8369°W | 1854–1902 | 3.87 mi (6.23 km) | 200 yd (180 m) | $50,000 |
| EF1 | Numerous large trees were downed, some of which fell on a cabin, and the cabin also suffered chimney damage. A trampoline was damaged and lawn furniture was tossed as well. | | | | | | | |
| EF0 | SSE of Modoc | Scott | KS | 38.4241°N 101.0543°W | 2056–2100 | 1 mi (1.6 km) | 50 yd (46 m) | $0 |
| EF0 | A storm chaser reported and photographed what appeared to be a landspout. | | | | | | | |
| EF0 | E of Modoc | Scott | KS | 38.451°N 101.0116°W | 2104–2122 | 4.17 mi (6.71 km) | 200 yd (180 m) | $0 |
| EF0 | Several storm chasers videotaped and photographed a tornado which did not hit anything. | | | | | | | |
| EF0 | N of Manning | Scott | KS | 38.6029°N 101.7326°W | 2155 | 0.1 mi (0.16 km) | 50 yd (46 m) | $0 |
| EF0 | Brief tornado was reported by an off-duty NWS employee. | | | | | | | |
| EF0 | N of Manning | Scott | KS | 38.6067°N 101.7222°W | 2155–2211 | 0.7 mi (1.1 km) | 100 yd (91 m) | $0 |
| EF0 | Tornado was reported and documented by an off-duty NWS employee. | | | | | | | |
| EF0 | ENE of Healy | Lane | KS | 38.6044°N 101.5899°W | 2213–2216 | 1.2 mi (1.9 km) | 50 yd (46 m) | $0 |
| EF0 | Tornado caused little to no damage. | | | | | | | |
| EF0 | ESE of Healy | Lane | KS | 38.5773°N 100.5311°W | 2224–2231 | 0.8 mi (1.3 km) | 125 yd (114 m) | $0 |
| EF0 | Tornado was reported by an off-duty NWS employee. | | | | | | | |
| EF0 | NE of Healy | Lane | KS | 38.6301°N 101.5489°W | 2226–2228 | 0.1 mi (0.16 km) | 15 yd (14 m) | $0 |
| EF0 | Brief tornado was reported by a storm chaser. | | | | | | | |
| EF1 | E of Shamrock to NE of Bristow | Creek | OK | 35.9085°N 96.4836°W | 2228–2243 | 8 mi (13 km) | 900 yd (820 m) | $750,000 |
| EF1 | Multiple homes were damaged, some severely, numerous outbuildings were destroyed, and many trees were either snapped or uprooted. | | | | | | | |
| EF0 | ENE of Shields | Lane | KS | 38.6356°N 101.3196°W | 2249–2250 | 0.1 mi (0.16 km) | 15 yd (14 m) | $0 |
| EF0 | Brief tornado was reported by a storm chaser. | | | | | | | |
| EF3 | NW of Minneola to NNE of Ensign | Ford | KS | 37.5031°N 100.1355°W | 2255–2325 | 14.7 mi (23.7 km) | 675 yd (617 m) | $0 |
| EF3 | Large cone tornado completely swept away a manufactured home, with nearby vehicles being thrown up to 150 yards away and mangled. Wooden power poles were snapped off and carried long distances through the air, and irrigation pivots were destroyed. One person taking shelter inside a bunker was injured when a piece of pipe penetrated the concrete wall. Video evidence suggests that this tornado may have been capable of producing EF4 damage. | | | | | | | |
| EF0 | NW of Minneola | Ford | KS | 37.5342°N 100.0931°W | 2259–2301 | 0.7 mi (1.1 km) | 50 yd (46 m) | $0 |
| EF0 | Brief and intermittent tornado under a different mesocyclone east-northeast of the previous tornado. | | | | | | | |
| EF0 | SSW of Alamota | Lane | KS | 38.3054°N 101.3457°W | 2259–2302 | 0.8 mi (1.3 km) | 50 yd (46 m) | $0 |
| EF0 | Brief tornado caused little to no damage. | | | | | | | |
| EF0 | SW of Alamota to SE of Beeler | Lane | KS | 38.4185°N 100.2717°W | 2304–2310 | 1.7 mi (2.7 km) | 50 yd (46 m) | $0 |
| EF0 | Tornado tracked to the south-southeast and caused no known damage. | | | | | | | |
| EF3 | ENE of Ravanna to SW of Ness City | Hodgeman, Ness | KS | 38.237°N 100.1663°W | 2312–2337 | 11.02 mi (17.73 km) | 300 yd (270 m) | $0 |
| EF3 | This strong tornado partially debarked hardwood trees, damaged farm machinery, fences, and storage tanks, and destroyed barns and outbuildings along its path. | | | | | | | |
| EF1 | ESE of Ensign | Ford | KS | 37.6182°N 100.091°W | 2314–2322 | 1.4 mi (2.3 km) | 50 yd (46 m) | $0 |
| EF1 | Large tree branches were broken and a stock tank was blown away. Tornado touched down to the east of the Minneola EF3 tornado. | | | | | | | |
| EF0 | ESE of Ensign | Ford | KS | 37.6281°N 100.1146°W | 2320–2321 | 0.2 mi (0.32 km) | 50 yd (46 m) | $0 |
| EF0 | Brief cone tornado touched down between the Minneola EF3 tornado and the previous tornado and lasted 45 to 60 seconds. | | | | | | | |
| EF2 | W of Ensign to SW of Dodge City | Ford | KS | 37.646°N 100.0988°W | 2322–2336 | 5 mi (8.0 km) | 550 yd (500 m) | $0 |
| EF2 | Large cone tornado. Power poles were snapped, a pivot sprinkler was flipped, and two more were damaged. A residence had its roof lifted off as well. The tornado appeared visually to be much stronger than an EF2. | | | | | | | |
| EF0 | SSW of Dodge City | Ford | KS | 37.6601°N 100.0816°W | 2328–2333 | 2.7 mi (4.3 km) | 90 yd (82 m) | $0 |
| EF0 | Intermittent tornado touchdowns, sometimes with two at the same time, to the east of the previous tornado. | | | | | | | |
| EF1 | SW of Dodge City | Ford | KS | 37.7003°N 100.0855°W | 2332–2338 | 2.9 mi (4.7 km) | 50 yd (46 m) | $0 |
| EF1 | Tornado touched down to the northeast of the Ensign EF2 tornado as it was dissipating and damaged two irrigation pivots. | | | | | | | |
| EF1 | SW of Ness City | Ness | KS | 38.338°N 100.0412°W | 2343–2350 | 2.9 mi (4.7 km) | 50 yd (46 m) | $0 |
| EF1 | Tornado touched down to the north of the Ness City EF3 tornado after it lifted and broke some large tree branches. | | | | | | | |
| EF0 | Akron | Washington | CO | 40.16°N 103.21°W | 2344 | 0.01 mi (0.016 km) | 50 yd (46 m) | $0 |
| EF0 | A trained storm spotter reported a brief tornado. | | | | | | | |
| EFU | ENE of Pringle | Hutchinson | TX | 36.04°N 101.22°W | 2344–2346 | 0.36 mi (0.58 km) | 25 yd (23 m) | $0 |
| EFU | An off-duty NWS employee reported an anticyclonic tornado. | | | | | | | |
| EF0 | SE of Shamrock | Adams | CO | 39.83°N 103.71°W | 2348 | 0.01 mi (0.016 km) | 50 yd (46 m) | $0 |
| EF0 | A trained storm spotter reported a brief tornado. | | | | | | | |
| EF2 | SW of Dodge City to SE of Kalvesta | Ford, Hodgeman | KS | 37.6999°N 100.0935°W | 2352–0016 | 16.7 mi (26.9 km) | 1,800 yd (1,600 m) | $0 |
| EF2 | This large multiple-vortex tornado snapped power poles, flipped a semi-truck, heavily damaged multiple homes, and destroyed pivot sprinklers and outbuildings. Two people were injured. Wind velocities within the tornado indicated that it may have briefly reached EF5 intensity. | | | | | | | |
| EF0 | NW of Dodge City | Ford | KS | 37.7922°N 100.0695°W | 2355–2356 | 0.1 mi (0.16 km) | 50 yd (46 m) | $0 |
| EF0 | Storm chasers encountered a brief tornado. | | | | | | | |
| EF0 | S of Ness City | Ness | KS | 38.4058°N 99.9547°W | 2356–0011 | 6.2 mi (10.0 km) | 150 yd (140 m) | $0 |
| EF0 | Trained storm spotters observed a tornado. | | | | | | | |
| EF0 | NW of Jetmore | Hodgeman | KS | 38.1651°N 100.0395°W | 0003–0005 | 0.6 mi (0.97 km) | 150 yd (140 m) | $0 |
| EF0 | Storm chasers reported a tornado. | | | | | | | |
| EF3 | N of Dodge City | Ford | KS | 37.8614°N 100.0497°W | 0007–0017 | 1.9 mi (3.1 km) | 150 yd (140 m) | $0 |
| EF3 | This large cone tornado caused extensive damage at the Ford County Landfill, where a large metal frame industrial building was destroyed. A large propane tank was thrown onto a road and ruptured, and an outbuilding was also destroyed further along the path. | | | | | | | |
| EF3 | NW of Jetmore to SSE of Beeler | Hodgeman, Ness | KS | 38.1961°N 100.0382°W | 0011–0030 | 7.7 mi (12.4 km) | 700 yd (640 m) | $0 |
| EF3 | A well-built frame home had its roof torn off and some exterior walls collapsed, with debris scattered long distances downwind. An oil tank was blown over, and a stock trailer was found three miles away from where it originated. Other pieces of machinery were found up to a mile away. Numerous power poles were snapped, and pivot sprinklers were damaged as well. | | | | | | | |
| EF1 | N of Dodge City | Ford, Hodgeman | KS | 37.906°N 100.0252°W | 0015–0024 | 2.7 mi (4.3 km) | 50 yd (46 m) | $0 |
| EF1 | A trailer house, an outbuilding, and some trees were damaged. | | | | | | | |
| EF0 | E of Ness City | Ness | KS | 38.4415°N 99.8154°W | 0017–0020 | 1.32 mi (2.12 km) | 50 yd (46 m) | $0 |
| EF0 | A trained storm spotter reported a south-southeast-moving tornado. | | | | | | | |
| EF1 | W of Centerview | Edwards | KS | 37.7859°N 99.4057°W | 0025–0033 | 4.3 mi (6.9 km) | 100 yd (91 m) | $0 |
| EF1 | Trees were uprooted and pivot sprinklers were damaged. | | | | | | | |
| EF0 | WNW of Jetmore | Hodgeman | KS | 37.9765°N 99.9408°W | 0036–0042 | 3.5 mi (5.6 km) | 50 yd (46 m) | $0 |
| EF0 | A tornado narrowly missed a farm house. | | | | | | | |
| EF0 | SE of Akron | Washington | CO | 40.16°N 103.21°W | 0044 | 0.01 mi (0.016 km) | 50 yd (46 m) | $0 |
| EF0 | Brief touchdown caused no damage. | | | | | | | |
| EF1 | ENE of Platner | Washington | CO | 40.1647°N 103.0467°W | 0047–0050 | 0.86 mi (1.38 km) | 20 yd (18 m) | Unknown |
| EF1 | A pole barn was lofted and completely destroyed, power poles were snapped, and trees were damaged. | | | | | | | |
| EF2 | W of Centerview | Edwards | KS | 37.7947°N 99.3725°W | 0049–0059 | 5.4 mi (8.7 km) | 150 yd (140 m) | $0 |
| EF2 | This strong anticyclonic tornado snapped power poles and tree limbs, left swirl marks in a wheat field, mangled a pivot sprinkler, and knocked over a sign. | | | | | | | |
| EF0 | W of Jetmore | Hodgeman | KS | 38.1035°N 100.082°W | 0055–0056 | 0.5 mi (0.80 km) | 50 yd (46 m) | $0 |
| EF0 | Storm chasers reported a brief tornado. | | | | | | | |
| EF3 | N of Centerview to W of Belpre | Edwards | KS | 37.8645°N 99.2707°W | 0100–0129 | 8.3 mi (13.4 km) | 1,100 yd (1,000 m) | $0 |
| EF3 | Large wedge tornado mangled a well-anchored pivot sprinkler, tearing a large, heavy concrete anchor completely out of the ground. Other pivot sprinklers along the path were flipped or sustained lesser damage, and a storage tank was overturned. Trees were denuded and debarked, large concrete feed bunks were thrown, and farm fields were scoured. Homes sustained roof damage, while outbuildings and grain bins were destroyed as well. | | | | | | | |
| EF0 | N of Yuma | Yuma | CO | 40.2279°N 102.7278°W | 0136–0139 | 1.21 mi (1.95 km) | 25 yd (23 m) | $0 |
| EF0 | An emergency manager reported a tornado. | | | | | | | |
| EF0 | E of Sawyer | Pratt | KS | 37.4775°N 98.6651°W | 0125–0132 | 2.3 mi (3.7 km) | 75 yd (69 m) | $0 |
| EF0 | Trained storm spotters reported a tornado. | | | | | | | |
| EF0 | SW of Otis | Rush | KS | 38.5015°N 99.0984°W | 0138–0140 | 0.2 mi (0.32 km) | 50 yd (46 m) | $0 |
| EF0 | Some trees sustained minor damage. | | | | | | | |
| EF0 | S of Imperial | Chase | NE | 40.39°N 101.64°W | 0306 | 0.1 mi (0.16 km) | 50 yd (46 m) | $50,000 |
| EF0 | Brief tornado flipped and dragged an empty irrigation pivot. | | | | | | | |

=== May 25 event ===
List of confirmed tornadoes – Wednesday, May 25, 2016
| EF# | Location | County / Parish | State | Start Coord. | Time (UTC) | Path length | Max width | Damage (2016 USD) |
|---|---|---|---|---|---|---|---|---|
| EF1 | NNE of Morris | Okmulgee | OK | 35.7108°N 95.8300°W | 0629–0635 | 1.8 mi (2.9 km) | 350 yd (320 m) | $5,000 |
| EF1 | Several trees and tree limbs were snapped, along with a power pole. | | | | | | | |
| EF0 | SW of Villard | Pope | MN | 45.6989°N 95.2829°W | 2010–2012 | 0.16 mi (0.26 km) | 25 yd (23 m) | $10,000 |
| EF0 | Several boats were flipped, a shed was damaged, and shingles were blown off a roof at Amelia Lake. | | | | | | | |
| EF0 | SW of Minneapolis | Ottawa | KS | 39.0566°N 97.7891°W | 2308–2309 | 0.47 mi (0.76 km) | 25 yd (23 m) | $0 |
| EF0 | Brief touchdown caused no damage. | | | | | | | |
| EF0 | NE of St. Anthony | Stearns | MN | 45.6894°N 94.6042°W | 2309–2315 | 3.3 mi (5.3 km) | 25 yd (23 m) | $15,000 |
| EF0 | A few trees were blown down, and a small amount of tin was peeled off of a barn roof. | | | | | | | |
| EF4 | ENE of Niles to ESE of Chapman | Ottawa, Dickinson | KS | 38.9955°N 97.4365°W | 0007–0140 | 25.09 mi (40.38 km) | 900 yd (820 m) | Unknown |
| EF4 | See article on this tornado - Eight people were injured. | | | | | | | |
| EF1 | E of Dwight to SSE of Alta Vista | Morris, Wabaunsee | KS | 38.85°N 96.5614°W | 0227–0240 | 5.3 mi (8.5 km) | 75 yd (69 m) | Unknown |
| EF1 | Two barns sustained roof damage and power poles were snapped along the path. | | | | | | | |
| EF2 | WNW of Carrier to SW of Hillsdale | Garfield | OK | 36.4966°N 98.0699°W | 0253–0312 | 5 mi (8.0 km) | 300 yd (270 m) | $20,000 |
| EF2 | This slow-moving cone tornado was caught on camera and broadcast live on television. 19 empty rail cars were blown off the tracks and a very large tree was downed. | | | | | | | |
| EF1 | S of Eskridge | Wabaunsee | KS | 38.7743°N 96.1443°W | 0325–0332 | 3.53 mi (5.68 km) | 50 yd (46 m) | Unknown |
| EF1 | A small farm building had its walls collapsed and large tree branches were broken. | | | | | | | |

=== May 26 event ===
List of confirmed tornadoes – Thursday, May 26, 2016
| EF# | Location | County / Parish | State | Start Coord. | Time (UTC) | Path length | Max width | Damage (2016 USD) |
|---|---|---|---|---|---|---|---|---|
| EF1 | Eastern Bryan | Brazos | TX | 30.6792°N 96.3106°W | 1730–1738 | 2.86 mi (4.60 km) | 50 yd (46 m) | $1,000,000 |
| EF1 | This high-end EF1 tornado moved through residential areas of Bryan, causing major roof damage to homes and downing trees. | | | | | | | |
| EF0 | SE of St. George | Riley | KS | 39.1733°N 96.3958°W | 1903 | 0.01 mi (0.016 km) | 25 yd (23 m) | $0 |
| EF0 | Law enforcement reported a brief touchdown near the Kansas River which caused no damage. | | | | | | | |
| EF1 | Wamego to N of Louisville | Pottawatomie | KS | 39.1976°N 96.3104°W | 1920–1945 | 5.55 mi (8.93 km) | 200 yd (180 m) | Unknown |
| EF1 | Tornado downed numerous trees and caused roof damage to homes in the towns of Wamego and Louisville. Rural properties sustained considerable damage outside of Wamego. | | | | | | | |
| EF0 | E of Independence | Washington | TX | 30.312°N 96.2315°W | 2003–2006 | 0.35 mi (0.56 km) | 30 yd (27 m) | $10,000 |
| EF0 | Numerous trees were downed in a convergent pattern. | | | | | | | |
| EF0 | Wallace Pack Unit | Grimes | TX | 30.3244°N 96.1074°W | 2020–2021 | 0.11 mi (0.18 km) | 30 yd (27 m) | $50,000 |
| EF0 | Numerous trees were uprooted around the prison, and cars in the parking lot were moved in different directions. | | | | | | | |
| EF1 | SSE of Navasota | Grimes | TX | 30.3137°N 96.0487°W | 2028–2031 | 0.1 mi (0.16 km) | 50 yd (46 m) | $100,000 |
| EF1 | Brief tornado tore much of the roof off of a two-story home, along with a wall on the second floor. Numerous large trees were snapped and uprooted as well. This tornado occurred simultaneously with the other Navasota tornado. | | | | | | | |
| EF2 | SSE of Navasota | Grimes | TX | 30.3069°N 96.0471°W | 2029–2032 | 1.28 mi (2.06 km) | 100 yd (91 m) | $200,000 |
| EF2 | Tornado destroyed a large metal building and a house, and numerous large trees were uprooted and snapped along the path. | | | | | | | |
| EF0 | SW of Rossville | Shawnee | KS | 39.1198°N 95.9632°W | 2100 | 0.01 mi (0.016 km) | 25 yd (23 m) | $0 |
| EF0 | Brief touchdown caused no damage. | | | | | | | |
| EF0 | Southern Silver Lake | Shawnee | KS | 39.0938°N 95.8586°W | 2106–2109 | 1.81 mi (2.91 km) | 50 yd (46 m) | Unknown |
| EF0 | A brief tornado caused tree damage and minor structural damage within a larger region of damaging winds. One outbuilding was heavily damaged. | | | | | | | |
| EF0 | SSW of Whiteman Air Force Base | Johnson | MO | 38.63°N 93.62°W | 2203–2205 | 1.38 mi (2.22 km) | 25 yd (23 m) | $0 |
| EF0 | Tornado remained over open country and caused no damage. | | | | | | | |
| EF0 | S of Kit Carson | Cheyenne | CO | 38.6401°N 102.7521°W | 2305–2308 | 0.02 mi (0.032 km) | 50 yd (46 m) | $0 |
| EF0 | Tornado remained over open country and caused no damage. | | | | | | | |
| EF0 | S of Seibert | Kit Carson | CO | 39.3611°N 102.8663°W | 2323–2329 | 4.1 mi (6.6 km) | 25 yd (23 m) | $0 |
| EF0 | Tornado remained over open country and caused no damage. | | | | | | | |
| EF1 | Northwestern Conroe | Montgomery | TX | 30.3350°N 95.5055°W | 2252–2253 | 0.96 mi (1.54 km) | 300 yd (270 m) | $100,000 |
| EF1 | Tree damage occurred along the path. | | | | | | | |
| EF1 | Burkett | Coleman | TX | 31.9511°N 99.3084°W | 0101–0108 | 5.44 mi (8.75 km) | 400 yd (370 m) | $0 |
| EF1 | A few trees and tree limbs were snapped, and outbuildings were damaged or destroyed. A community center in town sustained roof damage. | | | | | | | |
| EFU | NE of Glazier | Hemphill | TX | 36.05°N 100.06°W | 0110–0113 | 0.11 mi (0.18 km) | 25 yd (23 m) | $0 |
| EFU | Brief rope tornado remained over open country and caused no damage. | | | | | | | |
| EF0 | ESE of Sidney | Comanche | TX | 31.9422°N 98.7168°W | 0146–0149 | 1.01 mi (1.63 km) | 40 yd (37 m) | $30,000 |
| EF0 | Two homes sustained minor damage, at least three farm storage buildings were damaged or destroyed, and multiple trees were uprooted and large branches were broken off at a cemetery. | | | | | | | |

=== Solomon–Abilene–Chapman, Kansas ===
Solomon–Abilene–Chapman, Kansas
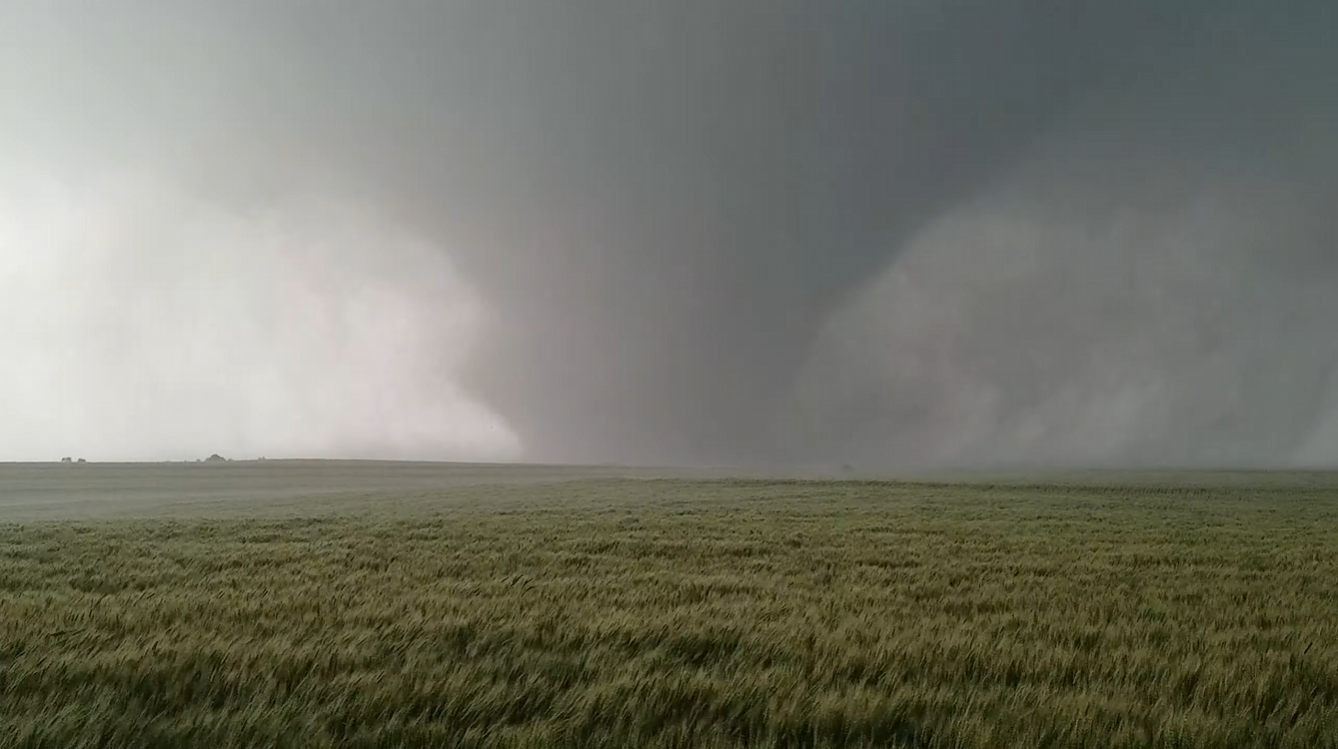
- The tornado seen behind a farmstead near Chapman. The farm was destroyed later on.

Meteorological history
- Formed: May 25, 2016, 7:07 p.m. CDT (UTC–05:00)
- Dissipated: May 25, 2016, 8:40 p.m. CDT (UTC–05:00)
- Duration: 1 hour, 33 minutes

EF4 tornado
- on the Enhanced Fujita scale
- Highest winds: 180 mph (290 km/h)

Overall effects
- Fatalities: 0
- Injuries: 8

This violent and long-lived wedge tornado was on the ground for 25.09 mi (40.38 km) and lasted for at least 90 minutes, producing at least mid-range EF4 damage at its most intense point. It first touched down near the Ottawa County community of Niles just after 7:07 PM local time.

The tornado moved eastward and reached EF3 strength to the north of Solomon, where a home lost its roof and exterior walls, and numerous trees were snapped. As the tornado crossed into Dickinson County and moved through rural areas northeast of Solomon, significant weakening occurred as EF1 tree and house damage was noted along this segment of the path. Re-intensification began to occur to the south of Talmage where a two-story house had much of its second floor destroyed, sustaining EF2 damage. A nearby home sustained EF1 damage to its roof as well. The tornado strengthened further as it passed to the north of Abilene, causing significant damage. A house near the corner of Gulf Road and 2700 Avenue sustained EF3 damage and was left with only interior rooms standing, while another home and a large metal outbuilding sustained EF2 damage.

High-end EF3 damage was noted along Hawk Road, where a large but poorly anchored home was completely flattened. The most intense damage in this area occurred at the intersection of Indy Road and 2700 Avenue, where a split-level home was completely swept away, leaving only the basement behind. Anchor bolts were present at this location, though the home's subflooring was poorly anchored. Outbuildings were also destroyed in the vicinity, and a two-story farm home sustained lesser damage. Further to the east, the tornado narrowed and weakened back to EF1 strength as it passed through areas to the northeast of Abeline, causing mainly minor tree damage. However, it strengthened back to EF2 intensity as it crossed I-70/US 40, snapping and denuding numerous large trees.

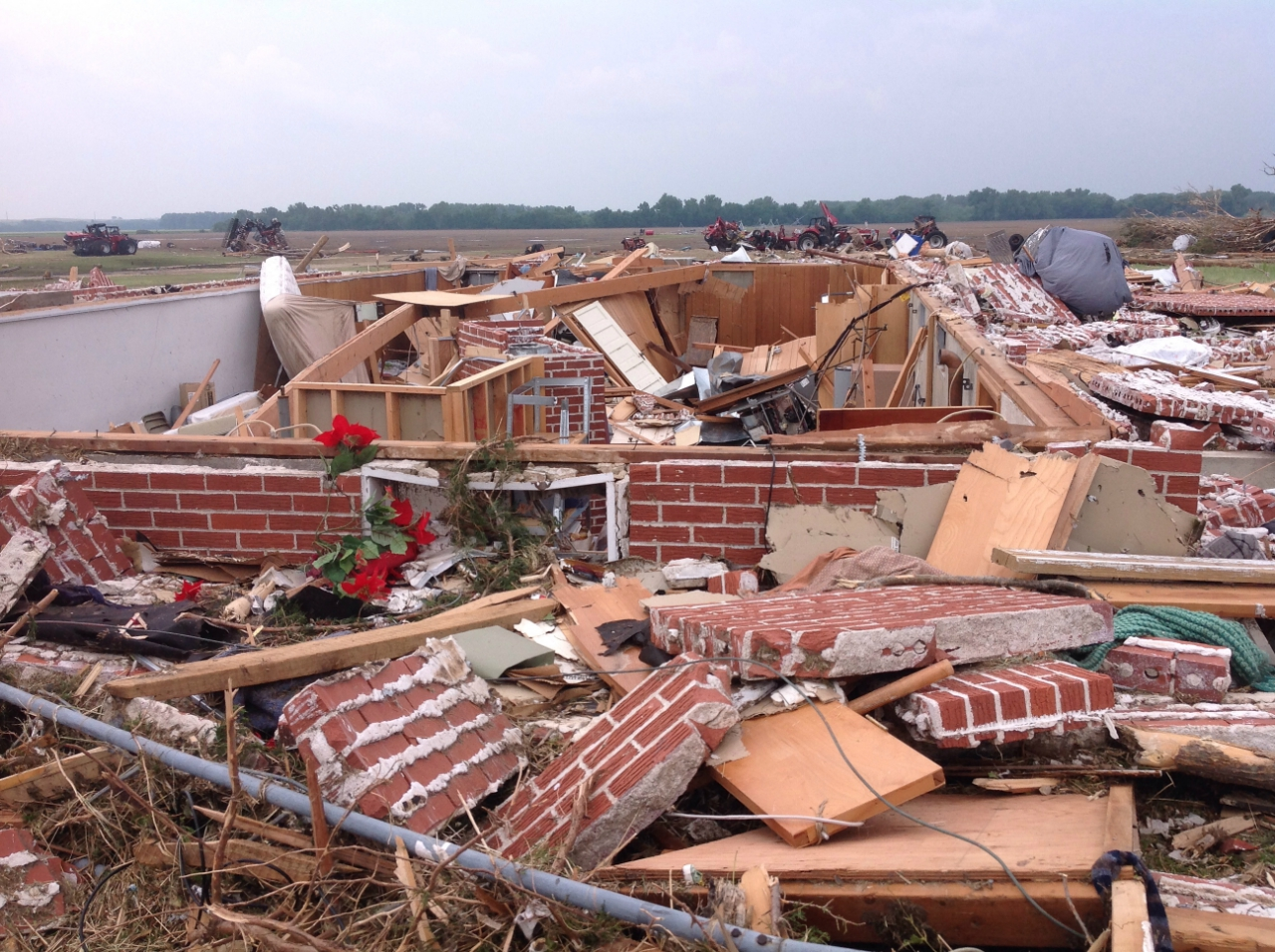
EF4 damage to a well-constructed brick farmhouse near Chapman, with destroyed machinery in the background.

The tornado then reached its peak strength as it passed just southwest of Chapman, which was placed under a tornado emergency, producing EF4 damage as it crossed Old Highway 40. A few farmsteads in this area were damaged or destroyed, including one where a large, anchor-bolted brick farm home was completely leveled and largely swept away. Only the basement and a pile of debris was left behind at this location. Part of the concrete foundation was severely cracked from the force of the house being ripped away, leaving rebar exposed. While officially given a wind speed estimate of 180 mph (290 km/h) by the damage survey team, the entry for this tornado in the National Climactic Data Center mentions that the wind speed may have approached over 200 mph (320 km/h), or EF5 intensity. However, the area around the house foundation was not swept clean of debris, preventing a rating higher than EF4.

Several vehicles and large pieces of heavy farm machinery in the vicinity were thrown and mangled beyond recognition. Numerous large trees were also denuded and debarked in this area, outbuildings were obliterated, and a set of railroad tracks was bent horizontally by the force of the tornado. While officially rated mid-range EF4, a NWS Topeka employee noted that "Thankfully, the tornado didn't hit any larger cities. Had this hit a city, like Abilene, where there's more structures to hit, this could have very well been an EF5 and we would have had perhaps fatalities." The tornado began to weaken as it passed south of Chapman, causing extensive tree damage and inflicting low-end EF3 damage to a large farm house. To the southeast of Chapman, a home was shifted off of its foundation at EF1 intensity before the tornado dissipated shortly after 8:30 PM. The tornado reached a maximum width of 1/2 mile wide along its path, and damaged or destroyed roughly 20 homes in Dickinson County. No fatalities and eight minor injuries occurred as a result of this tornado.

== See also ==
- List of North American tornadoes and tornado outbreaks
