= Keystone Township, Kansas =

Township in Scott County, Kansas, U.S.

Keystone Township
- Township
- Location within Scott County
- Coordinates: 38.482713°N 100.759758°W
- Country: United States
- State: Kansas
- County: Scott
- Established: 1886

Government
  - District 1 County Commissioner: Perry Nowak

Area
  - Total: 79.654 sq mi (206.30 km^{2})
  - Land: 79.654 sq mi (206.30 km^{2})
  - Water: 0 sq mi (0 km^{2}) 0%

Population (2020)
  - Total: 84
  - Density: 1.1/sq mi (0.41/km^{2})
- Time zone: UTC-6 (CST)
  - Summer (DST): UTC-5 (CDT)
- Area code: 620
- GNIS feature ID: 471465

Keystone Township is a township in Scott County, Kansas, United States. As of the 2020 census, its population was 84.

== History ==
Keystone Township was established in 1886, as was all townships in Scott County.

== Geography ==
Keystone Township covers an area of 79.654 square miles (206.30 square kilometers).

=== Communities ===
- Manning

=== Adjacent townships ===
Beaver Township, Scott County
		north	northeast	Cheyenne Township, Lane County
Scott Township, Scott County	west	self	east	Dighton Township, Lane County
		south
Lake Township, Scott County

== Transportation ==
=== Major highways ===
- K-96
