= Isbel Township, Kansas =

Township in Scott County, Kansas, U.S.

Isbel Township
- Township
- Location within Scott County
- Coordinates: 38.480212°N 101.056589°W
- Country: United States
- State: Kansas
- County: Scott
- Established: 1886

Government
  - District 2 County Commissioner: Cody Ellis

Area
  - Total: 79.677 sq mi (206.36 km^{2})
  - Land: 79.675 sq mi (206.36 km^{2})
  - Water: 0.002 sq mi (0.0052 km^{2}) 0%

Population (2020)
  - Total: 88
  - Density: 1.1/sq mi (0.43/km^{2})
- Time zone: UTC-6 (CST)
  - Summer (DST): UTC-5 (CDT)
- Area code: 620
- GNIS feature ID: 471461

Isbel Township is a township in Scott County, Kansas, United States. As of the 2020 census, its population was 88.

== History ==
Isbel Township was established in 1886, as was all townships in Scott County.

== Geography ==
Isbel Township covers an area of 79.677 square miles (206.36 square kilometers).

=== Communities ===
- Modoc

=== Adjacent townships ===
Beaver Township, Scott County
		north
Leoti Township, Wichita County	west	self	east	Scott Township, Scott County
		south
Valley Township, Scott County

== Transportation ==
=== Major highways ===
- K-96
