= New Cambria =

New Cambria is the name of several towns in the United States:

- New Cambria, Kansas
- New Cambria, Missouri
