= Heriberto Hermes =

American-born Roman Catholic bishop (1933–2018)

Heriberto João Hermes O.S.B.
- Prelate of Cristalândia
- Native name: Herbert John Hermes
- Church: Catholic Church
- See: Territorial Prelature of Cristalândia
- In office: June 20, 1990 – February 25, 2009
- Predecessor: Olívio Teodoro Obalhe
- Successor: Rodolfo Luís Weber

Orders
- Ordination: May 26, 1960 by Edward Joseph Hunkeler
- Consecration: September 2, 1990 by Mathias William Schmidt

Personal details
- Born: May 25, 1933 Shallow Water, Kansas, United States
- Died: January 3, 2018 (aged 84) Palmas, Tocantins, Brazil

Heriberto Hermes (May 25, 1933 – January 3, 2018) was an American-born Roman Catholic bishop.

Hermes was ordained a priest in 1960 and consecrated a bishop in 1990. He served as bishop of Cristalândia until retirement in 2009. Hermes was born in Shallow Water, Kansas, United States on May 25, 1933. He died at the age of 84 on January 3, 2018, at the General Hospital in Palmas, Tocantins.
