= Chevron, Kansas =

Unincorporated community in Scott County, Kansas

- Unincorporated community
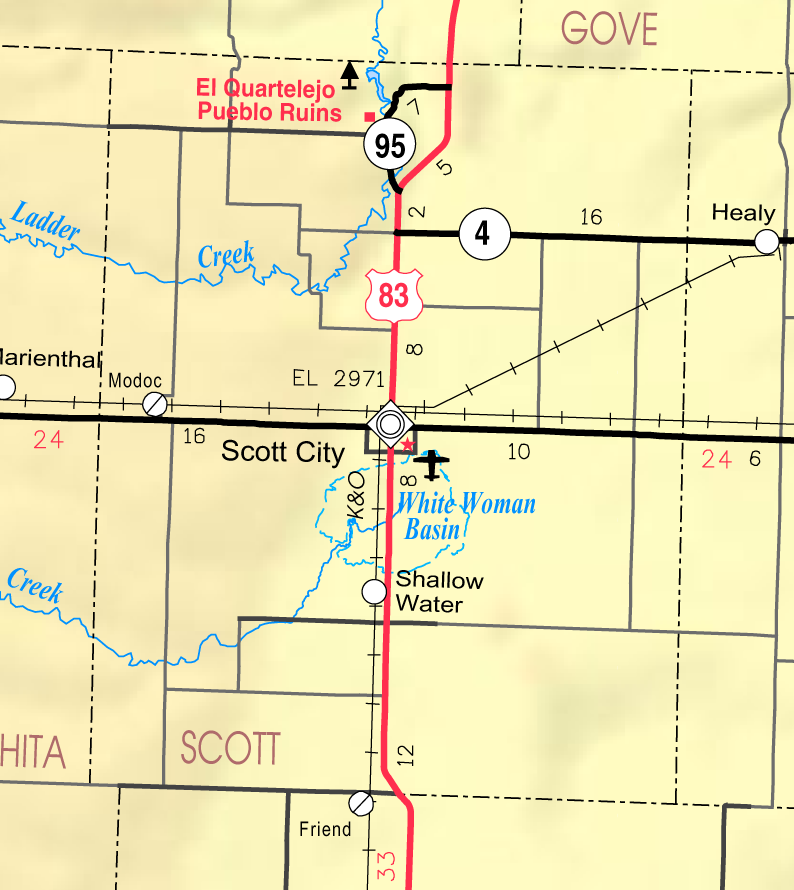
- KDOT map of Scott County (legend)

- Location within Kansas Location within the United States
- Coordinates: 38°18′45″N 100°54′37″W
- Country: United States
- State: Kansas
- County: Scott
- Elevation: 2,927 ft (892 m)
- Time zone: UTC-6 (CST)
  - Summer (DST): UTC-5 (CDT)
- Area code: 620
- FIPS code: 20-13010
- GNIS ID: 484923

Chevron is an unincorporated community in Scott County, Kansas, United States.
