= Diocese of Miracema do Tocantins =

Catholic ecclesiastical territory

Diocese of Miracema do Tocantins Dioecesis Miracemanus Tocantinensis

Catholic

Location
- Country: Brazil
- Ecclesiastical province: Palmas

Statistics
- Area: 47,816 km^{2} (18,462 sq mi)
- Population: Total; Catholics: (as of 2019); 224,620; 153,760 (68.5%)

Information
- Rite: Latin Rite
- Established: 11 October 1966 (60 years ago)
- Cathedral: Catedral Santa Terezinha do Menino Jesus

Current leadership
- Pope: Leo XIV
- Bishop: Philip Dickmans
- Metropolitan Archbishop: Pedro Brito Guimarães

The Roman Catholic Diocese of Miracema do Tocantins (Latin: Dioecesis Miracemanus Tocantinensis) is a diocese located in the city of Miracema do Tocantins in the ecclesiastical province of Palmas in Brazil.

== History ==
- October 11, 1966: Established as Territorial Prelature of Miracema do Norte from the Diocese of Porto Nacional
- August 4, 1981: Promoted as Diocese of Miracema do Norte
- October 14, 1989: Renamed as Diocese of Miracema do Tocantins
- July 10, 2019: Territory modified along with neighbouring Roman Catholic Diocese of Cristalândia
- January 31, 2023: Lost territories to establish the Roman Catholic Diocese of Araguaína

== Statistics ==
As per 10 July 2019, in time of modification, it pastorally served 153,760 Catholics (68.5% of 224,620 total) on 47,816 km² in 22 parishes with 21 priests (19 diocesan, 2 religious), 10 deacons, 31 lay religious (4 brothers, 27 sisters) and 7 seminarians.

== Leadership ==
=== Ordinaries, in reverse chronological order ===
- Bishops of Miracema do Tocantins (Roman rite), below
  - Bishop Philip Dickmans (2008.05.21 – present)
  - Bishop João José Burke, O.F.M. (1996.02.14 – 2006.03.14)
  - Bishop James Collins, C.Ss.R. (1989.10.04 – 1996.02.14)
- Bishop of Miracema do Norte (Roman Rite), below
  - Bishop James Collins, C.Ss.R. (1981.09.17 – 1989.10.04)
- Prelate of Miracema do Norte (Roman Rite), below
  - Bishop James Collins, C.Ss.R. (1966.10.27 – 1981.09.17)

=== Coadjutor bishop ===
- João José Burke, O.F.M. (1995-1996)
