= Niles, Kansas =

Unincorporated community in Ottawa County, Kansas

- Unincorporated community and CDP
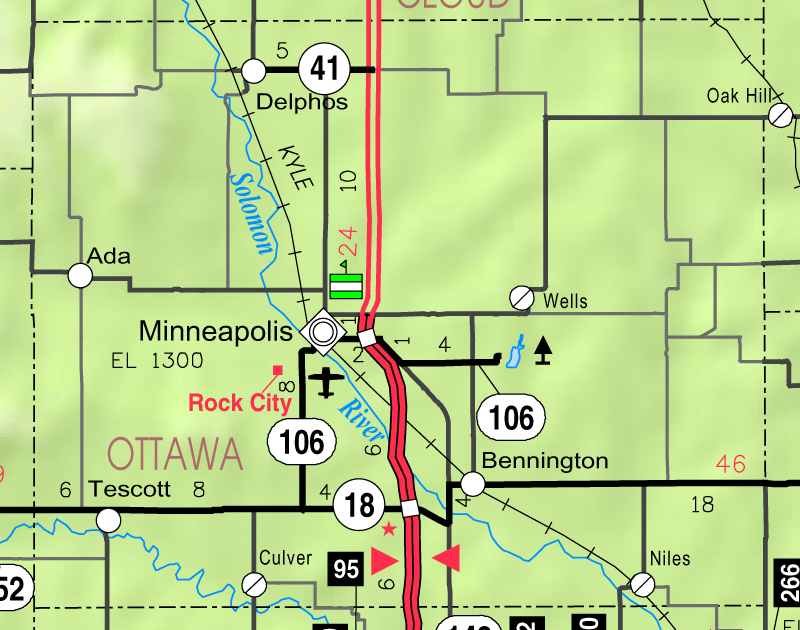
- KDOT map of Ottawa County (legend)

- Location within Kansas Location within the United States
- Coordinates: 38°58′08″N 97°27′27″W
- Country: United States
- State: Kansas
- County: Ottawa
- Elevation: 1,204 ft (367 m)

Population (2020)
  - Total: 56
- Time zone: UTC-6 (CST)
  - Summer (DST): UTC-5 (CDT)
- Area code: 785
- FIPS code: 20-50600
- GNIS ID: 2804526

Niles is an unincorporated community and census-designated place (CDP) in Ottawa County, Kansas, United States. As of the 2020 census, the population was 56. It is located northwest of Solomon along Arrowhead Rd and next to a railroad.

== History ==
A post office was opened in Niles (originally called Nilesville) in 1885, and remained in operation until it was discontinued in 1974.

== Demographics ==
Historical population
Census	Pop.	Note	%±
2020	56		—
U.S. Decennial Census

The 2020 United States census counted 56 people, 31 households, and 23 families in Niles. The population density was 122.5 per square mile (47.3/km^{2}). There were 31 housing units at an average density of 67.8 per square mile (26.2/km^{2}). The racial makeup was 92.86% (52) white or European American (92.86% non-Hispanic white), 0.0% (0) black or African-American, 0.0% (0) Native American or Alaska Native, 0.0% (0) Asian, 0.0% (0) Pacific Islander or Native Hawaiian, 0.0% (0) from other races, and 7.14% (4) from two or more races. Hispanic or Latino of any race was 0.0% (0) of the population.

Of the 31 households, 16.1% had children under the age of 18; 58.1% were married couples living together; 12.9% had a female householder with no spouse or partner present. 22.6% of households consisted of individuals and 6.5% had someone living alone who was 65 years of age or older. The average household size was 2.0 and the average family size was 1.8. The percent of those with a bachelor's degree or higher was estimated to be 0.0% of the population.

10.7% of the population was under the age of 18, 3.6% from 18 to 24, 10.7% from 25 to 44, 39.3% from 45 to 64, and 35.7% who were 65 years of age or older. The median age was 59.4 years. For every 100 females, there were 60.0 males. For every 100 females ages 18 and older, there were 61.3 males.

The 2016–2020 5-year American Community Survey estimates show that the median household income was $51,667 (with a margin of error of +/- $35,917) and the median family income was $44,875 (+/- $24,295). Females had a median income of $31,250 (+/- $3,258). The median income for those above 16 years old was $31,607 (+/- $12,202).

== Education ==
The community is served by Solomon USD 393 public school district.
