= Cristalândia =

Municipality in Tocantins, Brazil

- Municipality
- Location in Tocantins state

- Location in Brazil
- Coordinates: 10°36′00″S 49°11′34″W
- Country: Brazil
- Region: North
- State: Tocantins

Area
  - Total: 1,848 km^{2} (714 sq mi)

Population (2020)
  - Total: 7,278
  - Density: 3.938/km^{2} (10.20/sq mi)
- Time zone: UTC−3 (BRT)

Cristalândia is a municipality located in the Brazilian state of Tocantins.

Its population was 7,278 (2020) and its area is 1,848 km^{2}.

== Religion ==
The town is the seat of the Territorial Prelature of Cristalândia, headquartered Cúria Prelatícia, Praça da Catedral s.n, where is also its Catedral Prelatícia Nossa Senhora do Perpétuo Socorro, the Marian cathedral dedicated to Our Lady of Perpetual Support.

== See also ==
- List of municipalities in Tocantins

== Sources and References ==
- GCatholic, on the territorial prefecture, with Google map and picture
