= Archdiocese of Palmas =

Catholic ecclesiastical territory

Coordinates: 10.1866°S 48.3323°W

Archdiocese of Palmas Archidioecesis Palmensis in Brasilia

Catholic
- Coat of arms

Location
- Country: Brazil

Statistics
- Area: 29,938 km^{2} (11,559 sq mi)
- Population: Total; Catholics: (as of 2004); 183,385; 140,385 (76.6%)

Information
- Rite: Latin Rite
- Established: 27 March 1996 (30 years ago)
- Cathedral: Catedral Metropolitana São José

Current leadership
- Pope: Leo XIV
- Archbishop: Pedro Brito Guimarães

Website
- www.arquidiocesedepalmas.org.br

The Roman Catholic Archdiocese of Palmas (Latin: Archidioecesis Palmensis in Brasilia) is an archdiocese located in the city of Palmas in Brazil.

== History ==
- March 27, 1996: Established as Metropolitan Archdiocese of Palmas from the Diocese of Miracema do Tocantins and Diocese of Porto Nacional

== Leadership ==
- Archbishops of Palmas (Roman rite), in reverse chronological order
  - Archbishop Pedro Brito Guimarães (2010.10.20 - present)
  - Archbishop Alberto Taveira Corrêa (1996.03.27 – 2009.12.30), appointed Archbishop of Belém do Pará

== Suffragan dioceses ==
- Diocese of Araguaína
- Diocese of Cristalândia
- Diocese of Miracema do Tocantins
- Diocese of Porto Nacional
- Diocese of Tocantinópolis

== Sources ==
- GCatholic.org
- Catholic Hierarchy
- Archdiocese website (Portuguese)
