= Solomon USD 393 =

Public school district in Solomon, Kansas

Address
- 113 E. 7th St. Solomon, Kansas, 67480; United States
- Coordinates: 38.9226°N 97.3698°W

District information
- Type: Public
- Grades: K to 12
- Schools: 2

Other information
- Website: usd393.net

Solomon High School

Location
- 409 North Pine Street; Solomon, (Dickinson County), Kansas 67480; United States

Information
- Type: Public high school
- Principal: Liz Krause
- Staff: 9.10 (FTE)
- Enrollment: 113 (2023-24)
- Student to teacher ratio: 12.42
- Colors: Red and white
- Nickname: Gorillas
- Website: Solomon High School

Solomon USD 393 is a public unified school district headquartered in Solomon, Kansas, United States. The district includes the communities of Solomon, New Cambria, Niles, Verdi, and nearby rural areas.

== Schools ==
The school district operates the following schools:

- Solomon High School - 9 to 12
- Solomon Elementary School - PreK to 8

== See also ==
- Kansas State Department of Education
- Kansas State High School Activities Association
- List of high schools in Kansas
- List of unified school districts in Kansas
