= Beaver Township, Scott County, Kansas =

Township in Scott County, Kansas, U.S.

Beaver Township
- Township
- Location within Scott County
- Coordinates: 38.640117°N 101.027713°W
- Country: United States
- State: Kansas
- County: Scott
- Established: 1886

Government
  - District 2 County Commissioner: Cody Ellis

Area
  - Total: 119.31 sq mi (309.0 km^{2})
  - Land: 119.194 sq mi (308.71 km^{2})
  - Water: 0.116 sq mi (0.30 km^{2}) 0.10%

Population (2020)
  - Total: 260
  - Density: 2.2/sq mi (0.84/km^{2})
- Time zone: UTC-6 (CST)
  - Summer (DST): UTC-5 (CDT)
- Area code: 620
- GNIS feature ID: 471408

Beaver Township is a township in Scott County, Kansas, United States. As of the 2020 census, its population was 260.

== History ==
Beaver Township was established in 1886, as was all townships in Scott County.

== Geography ==
Beaver Township covers an area of 119.31 square miles (309.0 square kilometers). Lake Scott State Park lies within the township.

=== Communities ===
- Pence

=== Adjacent townships ===
Paxton Township, Logan County	northwest		northeast	Lees Township, Logan County
Leoti Township, Wichita County	west	self	east	Michigan Township, Scott County
		south	southeast	Scott Township, Scott County
Isbel Township, Scott County

== Transportation ==
=== Major highways ===
- US-83
- K-95
