= Valley Township, Scott County, Kansas =

Township in Scott County, Kansas, U.S.

Valley Township
- Township
- Location within Scott County
- Coordinates: 38.337337°N 101.016073°W
- Country: United States
- State: Kansas
- County: Scott
- Established: 1886

Government
  - District 1 County Commissioner: Perry Nowak

Area
  - Total: 120.002 sq mi (310.80 km^{2})
  - Land: 120.002 sq mi (310.80 km^{2})
  - Water: 0 sq mi (0 km^{2}) 0%

Population (2020)
  - Total: 225
  - Density: 1.87/sq mi (0.724/km^{2})
- Time zone: UTC-6 (CST)
  - Summer (DST): UTC-5 (CDT)
- Area code: 620
- GNIS feature ID: 471502

Valley Township is a township in Scott County, Kansas, United States. As of the 2020 census, its population was 225.

== History ==
Valley Township was established in 1886, as was all townships in Scott County.

== Geography ==
Valley Township covers an area of 120.002 square miles (310.80 square kilometers).

=== Communities ===
- Shallow Water

=== Adjacent townships ===
Isbel Township, Scott County
		north	northeast	Scott Township, Scott County
Leoti Township, Wichita County	west	self	east	Lake Township, Scott County
East Hibbard Township, Kearny County	southwest	south
Terry Township, Finney County

== Transportation ==
=== Major highways ===
- US-83
