= Verdi, Kansas =

Unincorporated community in Ottawa County, Kansas

Coordinates: 38°59′30″N 97°30′11″W

Verdi is an unincorporated community in Ottawa County, Kansas, United States.

== History ==
Verdi was platted in 1884. It was named for the Italian composer Giuseppe Verdi.

The only post office in Verdi was discontinued in 1913.

== Education ==
The community is served by Solomon USD 393 public school district.
