= Diocese of Cristalândia =

Catholic ecclesiastical territory

Diocese of Cristalândia Dioecesis Cristalandiensis

Catholic
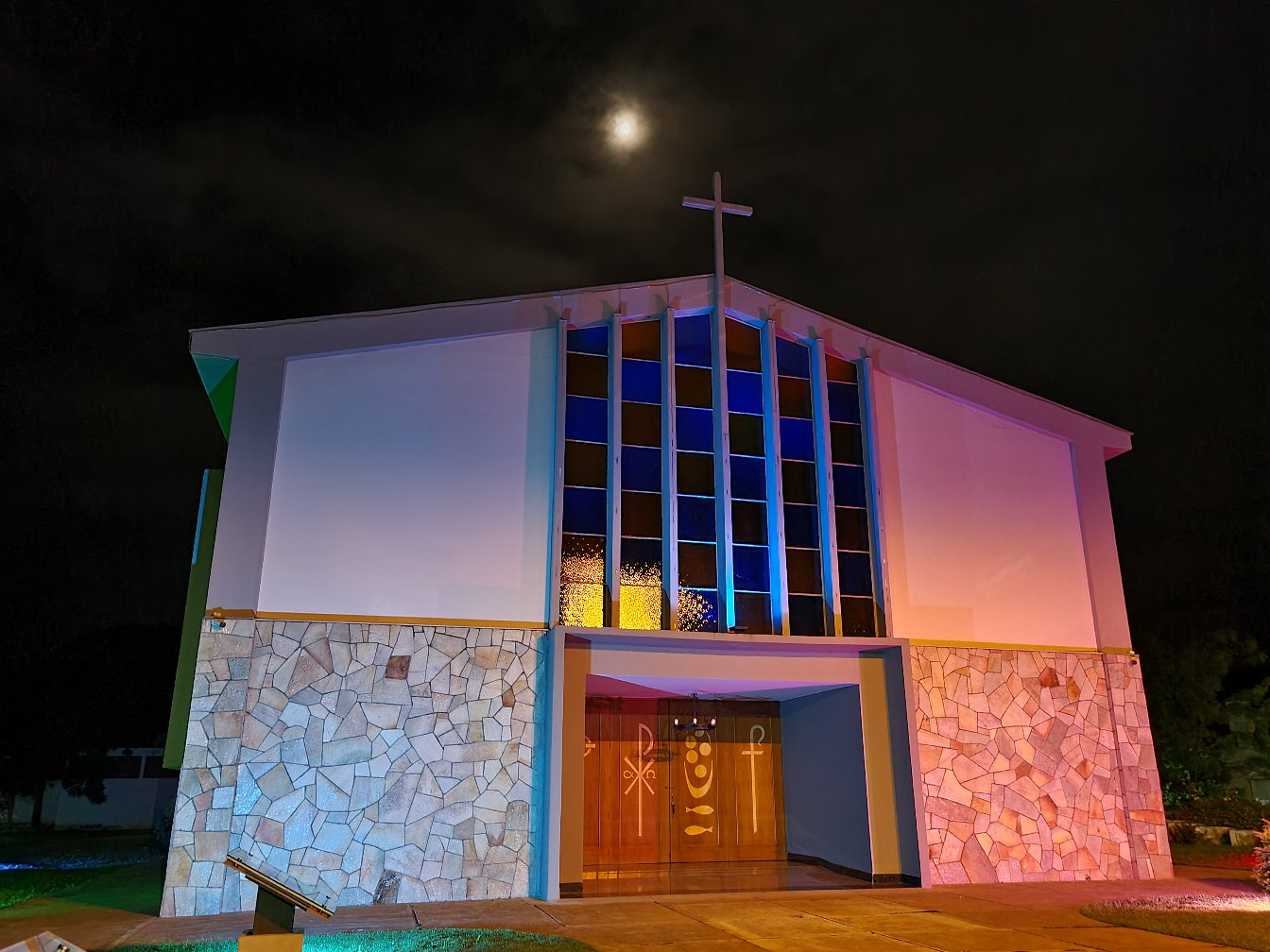
- Catedral Prelatícia Nossa Senhora do Perpétuo Socorro in 2021

Location
- Country: Brazil
- Ecclesiastical province: Palmas
- Coordinates: 10°36′00″S 49°11′34″W

Statistics
- Area: 62,691 km^{2} (24,205 sq mi)
- Population: Total; Catholics: (as of 2019); 245,020; 138,750 (56.6%)

Information
- Rite: Latin Rite
- Established: 26 March 1956 (70 years ago)
- Cathedral: Catedral Prelatícia Nossa Senhora do Perpétuo Socorro

Current leadership
- Pope: Leo XIV
- Bishop: Wellington de Queiroz Vieira
- Metropolitan Archbishop: Pedro Brito Guimarães

Website
- www.prelaziadecristalandia.com.br

The Roman Catholic Diocese of Cristalândia (Latin: Dioecesis Cristalandiensis) is a diocese in the ecclesiastical province of Palmas in central Brazil.

Its episcopal cathedral is the Marian Catedral Prelatícia Nossa Senhora do Perpétuo Socorro, dedicated to Our Lady of Perpetual Support, in the city of Cristalândia in the Amazonian state of Tocantins. It comprises municipalities in southwest Tocantins and five in northwest Goiás state.

== History ==
- Established on 26 March 1956 as Territorial Prelature of Cristalândia, on territories split off from the Territorial Prelature of São José de Alto Tocantins and the (suppressed) Territorial Prelature of Bananal
- It lost territories twice to daughter jurisdictions : on 1969.05.13 to establish Territorial Prelature of São Félix (in the Ecclesiastical Province of Cuiaba), and on 1976.03.27 to establish Territorial Prelature of Santíssima Conceição do Araguaia (now a sister diocese in Palmas province).
- On 10 July 2019 was elevated in the rank of diocese and its territory was modified along with the territory of the neighbouring Roman Catholic Diocese of Miracema do Tocantins.

== Statistics ==
As per 2015, it pastorally served 176,700 Catholics (80.0% of 221,000 total) on 62,691 km^{2} in 17 parishes and 80 missions with 20 priests (16 diocesan, 4 religious), 1 deacon, 25 lay religious (5 brothers, 20 sisters) and 2 seminarians.

As per 10 July 2019, in time of modification, it pastorally served 138,750 Catholics (56.6% of 245,020 total) on 62,691 km^{2} in 17 parishes and 80 missions with 19 priests (17 diocesan, 2 religious), no deacons, 25 lay religious (2 brothers, 23 sisters) and 10 seminarians.

== Episcopal Ordinaries ==
(all Roman rite; initially members of missionary Latin congregations)

Bishop-Prelates of Cristalândia

- Jaime Antônio Schuck, O.F.M. (born USA) (1958.11.25 – retired 1988.05.11), initially Titular Bishop of Avissa (1958.11.25 – 1978.05.26), died 1993
- Olívio Teodoro Obalhe, O.F.M. (first native incumbent) (1988.05.11 – died 1989.09.29), previously Coadjutor Bishop-Prelate of Cristalândia (1987.03.12 – 1988.05.11)
- Heriberto Hermes, O.S.B. (born USA) (1990.06.20 – retired 2009.02.25), died 2018
- Rodolfo Luís Weber (2009.02.25 – 2015.12.02); next Metropolitan Archbishop of Passo Fundo (Brazil) (2015.12.02 – ...)
- Wellington de Queiroz Vieira (2016.11.16 - 2019.07.10), no previous prelature.

Diocesan Bishops of Cristalândia

- Wellington de Queiroz Vieira (2019.07.10 - present).

== See also ==
- List of Catholic dioceses in Brazil

== Sources and References ==
- GCatholic.org, data for all sections, with Google map and HQ picture
- Catholic Hierarchy
- (in Portuguese) Official website
