= Hutchins, Kansas =

Unincorporated community in Scott County, Kansas

- Unincorporated community
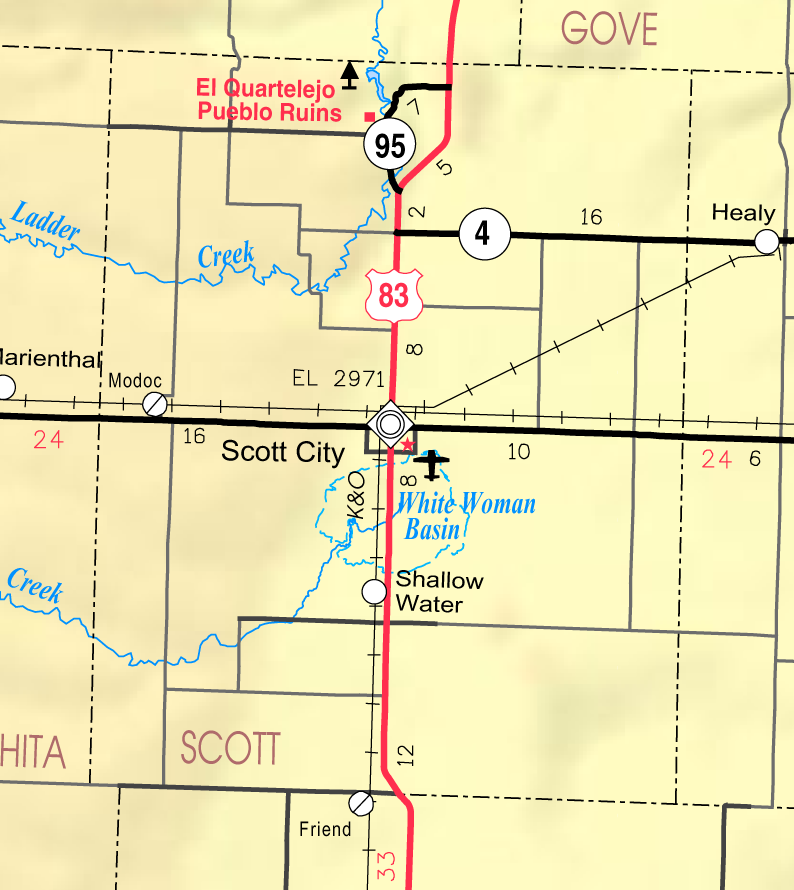
- KDOT map of Scott County (legend)

- Location within Kansas Location within the United States
- Coordinates: 38°26′23″N 100°54′56″W
- Country: United States
- State: Kansas
- County: Scott
- Elevation: 2,946 ft (898 m)
- Time zone: UTC-6 (CST)
  - Summer (DST): UTC-5 (CDT)
- Area code: 620
- FIPS code: 20-33615
- GNIS ID: 484921

Hutchins is an unincorporated community in Scott County, Kansas, United States.
