= Lake Township, Scott County, Kansas =

Township in Scott County, Kansas, U.S.

Lake Township
- Township
- Location within Scott County
- Coordinates: 38.3374°N 100.795164°W
- Country: United States
- State: Kansas
- County: Scott
- Established: 1886

Government
  - District 1 County Commissioner: Perry Nowak

Area
  - Total: 120.166 sq mi (311.23 km^{2})
  - Land: 120.166 sq mi (311.23 km^{2})
  - Water: 0 sq mi (0 km^{2}) 0%

Population (2020)
  - Total: 71
  - Density: 0.59/sq mi (0.23/km^{2})
- Time zone: UTC-6 (CST)
  - Summer (DST): UTC-5 (CDT)
- Area code: 620
- GNIS feature ID: 471511

Lake Township is a township in Scott County, Kansas, United States. As of the 2020 census, its population was 71.

== History ==
Lake Township was established in 1886, as was all townships in Scott County.

== Geography ==
Lake Township covers an area of 120.166 square miles (311.23 square kilometers). Dry Lake, an ephemeral lake, lies within the township.

=== Adjacent townships ===
Keystone Township, Scott County
Scott Township, Scott County	northwest	north
Valley Township, Scott County	west	self	east	Dighton Township, Lane County
Terry Township, Finney County	southwest	south
Pleasant Valley Township, Finney County

== Transportation ==
=== Major highways ===
- US-83
