= Pence, Kansas =

Unincorporated community in Scott County, Kansas

- Unincorporated community
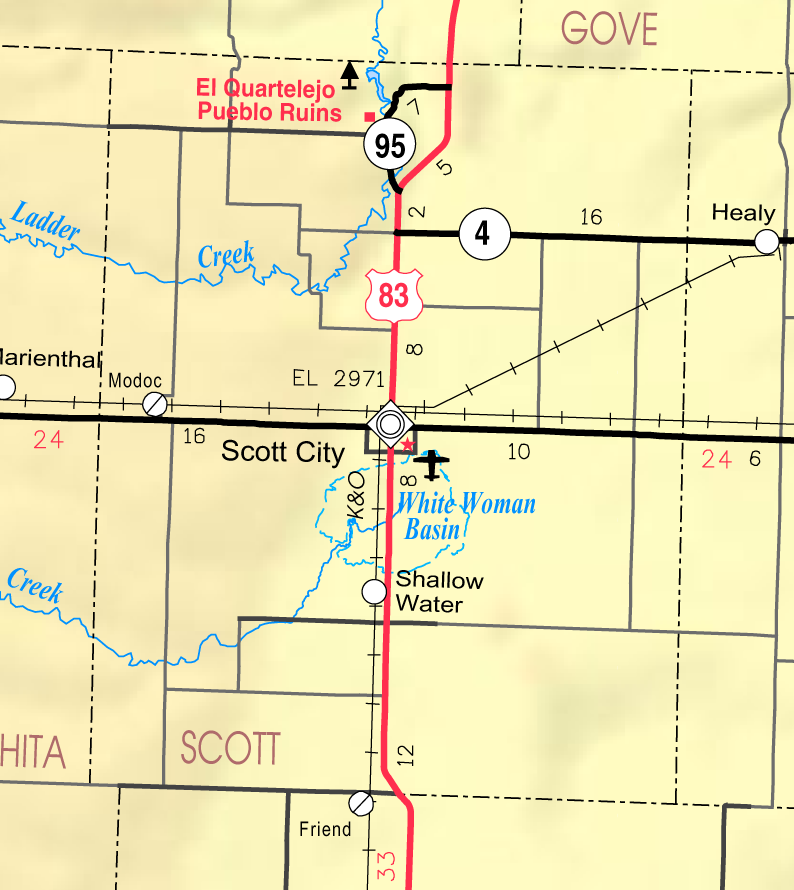
- KDOT map of Scott County (legend)

- Location within Kansas Location within the United States
- Coordinates: 38°39′21″N 101°4′22″W
- Country: United States
- State: Kansas
- County: Scott
- Platted: 1886
- Elevation: 3,133 ft (955 m)
- Time zone: UTC-6 (CST)
  - Summer (DST): UTC-5 (CDT)
- Area code: 620
- FIPS code: 20-55250
- GNIS ID: 471413

Pence is an unincorporated community in Scott County, Kansas, United States.

== History ==
The community of Pence was platted on 1886 October 27. A post office was opened in Pence in 1887, and remained in operation until it was discontinued in 1920.
