= Scott Township, Scott County, Kansas =

Township in Scott County, Kansas, U.S.

Scott Township
- Township
- Location within Scott County
- Coordinates: 38.519034°N 100.944083°W
- Country: United States
- State: Kansas
- County: Scott
- Established: 1886

Government
  - District 1 County Commissioner: Perry Nowak

Area
  - Total: 77.375 sq mi (200.40 km^{2})
  - Land: 77.375 sq mi (200.40 km^{2})
  - Water: 0 sq mi (0 km^{2}) 0%

Population (2020)
  - Total: 230
  - Density: 3.0/sq mi (1.1/km^{2})
- Time zone: UTC-6 (CST)
  - Summer (DST): UTC-5 (CDT)
- Area code: 620
- GNIS feature ID: 471464

Scott Township is a township in Scott County, Kansas, United States. As of the 2020 census, its population was 230.

== History ==
Scott Township was established in 1886, as was all townships in Scott County.

== Geography ==
Scott Township covers an area of 77.375 square miles (200.40 square kilometers). The city of Scott City is completely surrounded by the township but is governmentally independent of it.

=== Communities ===
- Hutchins

=== Adjacent townships ===
Beaver Township, Scott County	northwest		northeast	Michigan Township, Scott County
Isbel Township, Scott County	west	self	east	Keystone Township, Scott County
Valley Township, Scott County	southwest		southeast	Lake Township, Scott County

== Transportation ==
=== Major highways ===
- US-83
- K-96
