= Michigan Township, Kansas =

Township in Scott County, Kansas, U.S.

Michigan Township
- Township
- Location within Scott County
- Coordinates: 38.62751°N 100.797454°W
- Country: United States
- State: Kansas
- County: Scott
- Established: 1886

Government
  - District 2 County Commissioner: Cody Ellis

Area
  - Total: 118.807 sq mi (307.71 km^{2})
  - Land: 118.807 sq mi (307.71 km^{2})
  - Water: 0 sq mi (0 km^{2}) 0%

Population (2020)
  - Total: 80
  - Density: 0.67/sq mi (0.26/km^{2})
- Time zone: UTC-6 (CST)
  - Summer (DST): UTC-5 (CDT)
- Area code: 620
- GNIS feature ID: 471439

Michigan Township is a township in Scott County, Kansas, United States. As of the 2020 census, its population was 80.

== History ==
Michigan Township was established in 1886, as was all townships in Scott County. The township was settled during 1886 and 1887, and settlers founded the town of Zenobia. Zenobia was abandoned shortly after in 1891.

== Geography ==
Michigan Township covers an area of 118.807 square miles (307.71 square kilometers). West Salt Creek flows through it.

=== Adjacent townships ===
Lees Township, Logan County	northwest		northeast	Lewis Township, Gove County
Beaver Township, Scott County	west	self	east	Cheyenne Township, Lane County
Scott Township, Scott County	southwest	south
Keystone Township, Scott County

== Transportation ==
=== Major highways ===
- US-83
- K-4
- K-95
