= New Cambria, Kansas =

City in Saline County, Kansas

- City
- Location within Saline County and Kansas

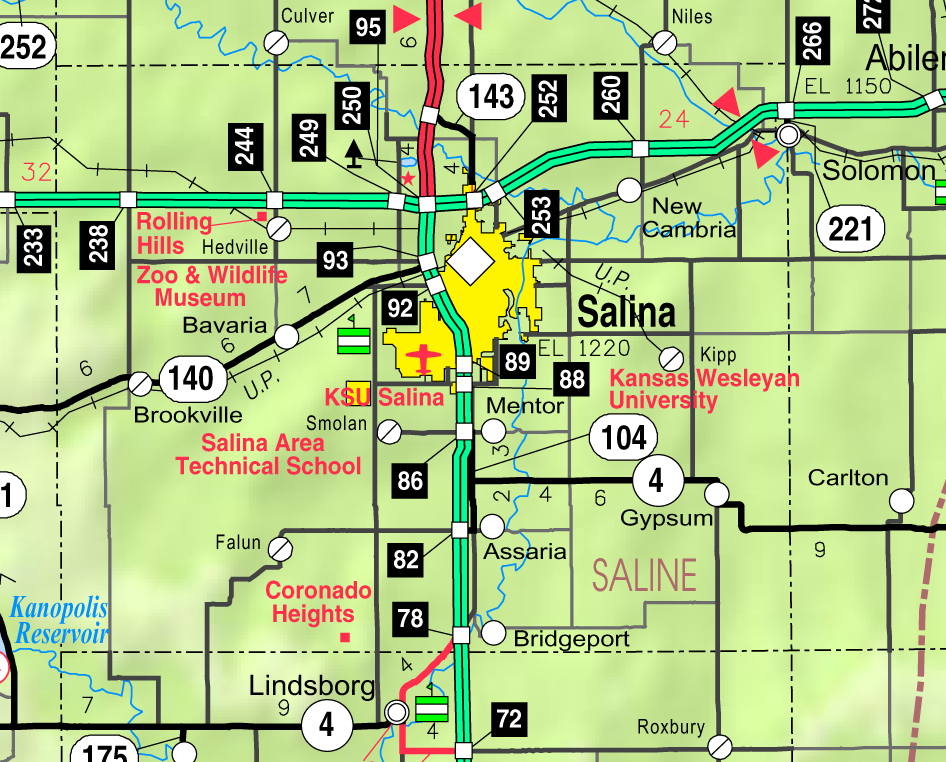
- KDOT map of Saline County (legend)
- Coordinates: 38°52′43″N 97°30′21″W
- Country: United States
- State: Kansas
- County: Saline
- Founded: 1800s
- Incorporated: 1913
- Named for: Cambria County, Pennsylvania

Area
  - Total: 0.18 sq mi (0.46 km^{2})
  - Land: 0.18 sq mi (0.46 km^{2})
  - Water: 0 sq mi (0.00 km^{2})
- Elevation: 1,194 ft (364 m)

Population (2020)
  - Total: 106
  - Density: 600/sq mi (230/km^{2})
- Time zone: UTC-6 (CST)
  - Summer (DST): UTC-5 (CDT)
- ZIP Code: 67470
- Area code: 785
- FIPS code: 20-50300
- GNIS ID: 476643
- Website: newcambriaks.com

New Cambria is a city in Saline County, Kansas, United States. As of the 2020 census, the population of the city was 106.

== History ==
New Cambria was named after Cambria County, Pennsylvania, the native home of an early settler.

The first post office in New Cambria was established in June 1873.

== Geography ==
New Cambria is located at 38°52′43″N 97°30′21″W (38.878504, -97.505730). According to the United States Census Bureau, the city has a total area of 0.22 square miles (0.57 km^{2}), all land.

== Demographics ==
Historical population
Census	Pop.	Note	%±
1880	47		—
1920	127		—
1930	130		2.4%
1940	144		10.8%
1950	160		11.1%
1960	187		16.9%
1970	160		−14.4%
1980	175		9.4%
1990	152		−13.1%
2000	150		−1.3%
2010	126		−16.0%
2020	106		−15.9%
U.S. Decennial Census

It is part of the Salina Micropolitan Statistical Area.

=== 2020 census ===
The 2020 United States census counted 106 people, 47 households, and 28 families in New Cambria. The population density was 595.5 per square mile (229.9/km^{2}). There were 55 housing units at an average density of 309.0 per square mile (119.3/km^{2}). The racial makeup was 82.08% (87) white or European American (82.08% non-Hispanic white), 0.0% (0) black or African-American, 0.0% (0) Native American or Alaska Native, 0.94% (1) Asian, 0.0% (0) Pacific Islander or Native Hawaiian, 0.0% (0) from other races, and 16.98% (18) from two or more races. Hispanic or Latino of any race was 3.77% (4) of the population.

Of the 47 households, 19.1% had children under the age of 18; 44.7% were married couples living together; 17.0% had a female householder with no spouse or partner present. 34.0% of households consisted of individuals and 10.6% had someone living alone who was 65 years of age or older. The average household size was 1.6 and the average family size was 3.2. The percent of those with a bachelor's degree or higher was estimated to be 1.9% of the population.

17.9% of the population was under the age of 18, 5.7% from 18 to 24, 31.1% from 25 to 44, 30.2% from 45 to 64, and 15.1% who were 65 years of age or older. The median age was 39.0 years. For every 100 females, there were 103.8 males. For every 100 females ages 18 and older, there were 89.1 males.

The 2016–2020 5-year American Community Survey estimates show that the median household income was $73,382 (with a margin of error of +/- $11,675). Males had a median income of $73,235 (+/- $23,284) versus $41,250 (+/- $38,024) for females. The median income for those above 16 years old was $73,015 (+/- $28,404). Approximately, 0.0% of families and 10.9% of the population were below the poverty line, including 0.0% of those under the age of 18 and 0.0% of those ages 65 or over.

=== 2010 census ===
As of the census of 2010, there were 126 people, 56 households, and 37 families living in the city. The population density was 572.7 inhabitants per square mile (221.1/km^{2}). There were 70 housing units at an average density of 318.2 per square mile (122.9/km^{2}). The racial makeup of the city was 96.8% White, 0.8% Native American, and 2.4% from two or more races. Hispanic or Latino of any race were 0.8% of the population.

There were 56 households, of which 21.4% had children under the age of 18 living with them, 50.0% were married couples living together, 10.7% had a female householder with no husband present, 5.4% had a male householder with no wife present, and 33.9% were non-families. 30.4% of all households were made up of individuals, and 7.2% had someone living alone who was 65 years of age or older. The average household size was 2.25 and the average family size was 2.81.

The median age in the city was 46 years. 17.5% of residents were under the age of 18; 8.8% were between the ages of 18 and 24; 21.4% were from 25 to 44; 33.4% were from 45 to 64; and 19% were 65 years of age or older. The gender makeup of the city was 51.6% male and 48.4% female.

=== 2000 census ===
As of the census of 2000, there were 150 people, 57 households, and 44 families living in the city. The population density was 1,463.7 inhabitants per square mile (565.1/km^{2}). There were 66 housing units at an average density of 644.0 per square mile (248.6/km^{2}). The racial makeup of the city was 96.67% White, 1.33% African American, and 2.00% from two or more races.

There were 57 households, out of which 36.8% had children under the age of 18 living with them, 59.6% were married couples living together, 12.3% had a female householder with no husband present, and 21.1% were non-families. 15.8% of all households were made up of individuals, and 1.8% had someone living alone who was 65 years of age or older. The average household size was 2.63 and the average family size was 2.89.

In the city, the population was spread out, with 27.3% under the age of 18, 7.3% from 18 to 24, 33.3% from 25 to 44, 22.7% from 45 to 64, and 9.3% who were 65 years of age or older. The median age was 36 years. For every 100 females, there were 123.9 males. For every 100 females age 18 and over, there were 113.7 males.

The median income for a household in the city was $36,607, and the median income for a family was $40,500. Males had a median income of $30,250 versus $23,125 for females. The per capita income for the city was $15,218. There were 2.0% of families and 5.5% of the population living below the poverty line, including 9.5% of under eighteens and none of those over 64.

== Education ==
The community is served by Solomon USD 393 public school district.
