= Shallow Water, Kansas =

Unincorporated community in Scott County, Kansas

- Unincorporated community and CDP
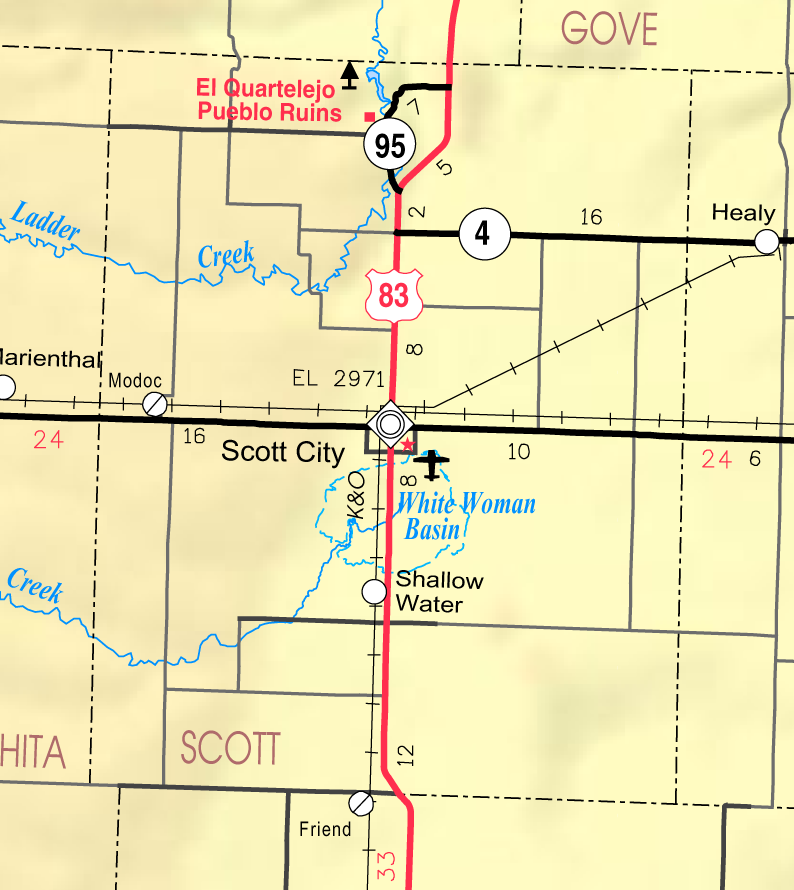
- KDOT map of Scott County (legend)

- Location within Kansas Location within the United States
- Coordinates: 38°22′25″N 100°54′47″W
- Country: United States
- State: Kansas
- County: Scott
- Elevation: 2,950 ft (900 m)

Population (2020)
  - Total: 89
- Time zone: UTC-6 (CST)
  - Summer (DST): UTC-5 (CDT)
- Area code: 620
- FIPS code: 20-64200
- GNIS ID: 471510

Shallow Water is an unincorporated community and census-designated place (CDP) in Scott County, Kansas, United States. As of the 2020 census, the population was 89.

== History ==
Its post office was established January 13, 1913, and closed October 31, 1957. Shallow Water is the northern terminus of the Garden City Western Railway.

== Demographics ==
Historical population
Census	Pop.	Note	%±
2020	89		—
U.S. Decennial Census

== Education ==
The community is served by Scott County USD 466 public school district..

Shallow Water schools were closed through school unification. The Shallow Water High School mascot was Shallow Water Tigers. The Shallow Water Tigers won the Kansas State High School Boys class B Cross Country championship in 1960 and 1961.

== Notable people ==
- Heriberto Hermes (1932-2018), Roman Catholic bishop, was born in Shallow Water; he served as bishop of the Roman Catholic Territorial Prelature of Cristalândia, Brazil from 1990 to 2009.
