= Modoc, Kansas =

Unincorporated community in Scott County, Kansas

- Unincorporated community
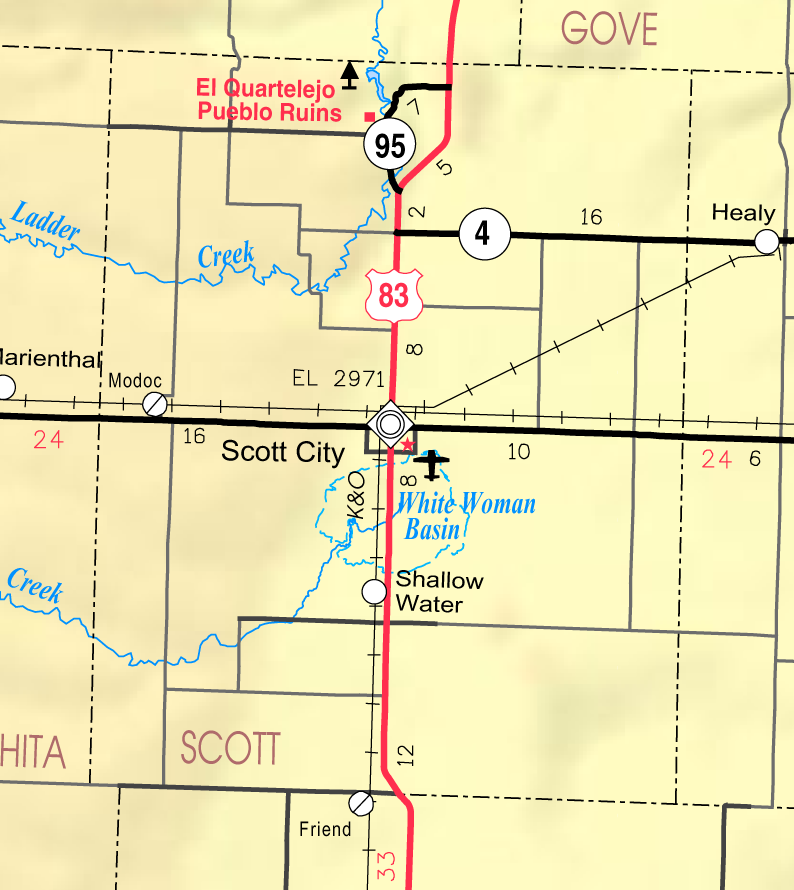
- KDOT map of Scott County (legend)

- Location within Kansas Location within the United States
- Coordinates: 38°29′13″N 101°4′55″W
- Country: United States
- State: Kansas
- County: Scott
- Elevation: 3,137 ft (956 m)
- Time zone: UTC-6 (CST)
  - Summer (DST): UTC-5 (CDT)
- ZIP Code: 67863
- Area code: 620
- FIPS code: 20-47575
- GNIS ID: 471504

Modoc is an unincorporated community in Scott County, Kansas, United States.

== History ==
A post office was opened in Modoc (formerly called Plummer) in 1886, and remained in operation until it was discontinued in 1992. The community was also formerly called Isabel.
