= Solomon, Kansas =

City in Dickinson and Saline Counties of Kansas

- City
- Location within Dickinson County and Kansas

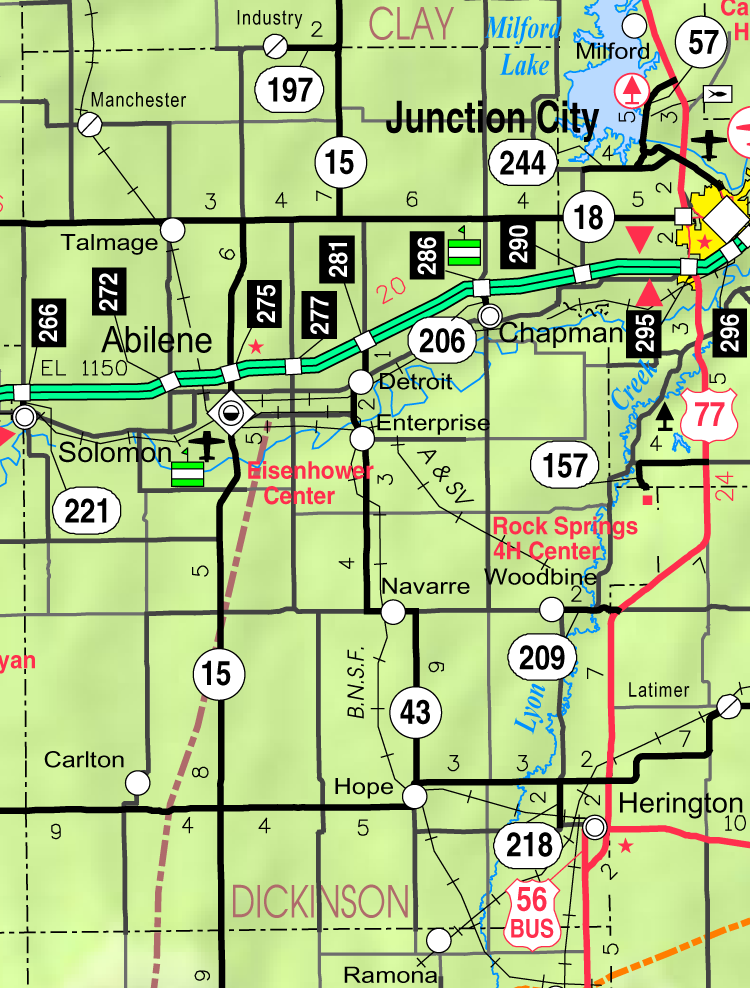
- KDOT map of Dickinson County (legend)
- Coordinates: 38°55′12″N 97°22′20″W
- Country: United States
- State: Kansas
- Counties: Dickinson, Saline
- Founded: 1866
- Incorporated: 1871
- Named for: Solomon River

Area
  - Total: 0.86 sq mi (2.23 km^{2})
  - Land: 0.86 sq mi (2.23 km^{2})
  - Water: 0 sq mi (0.00 km^{2})
- Elevation: 1,184 ft (361 m)

Population (2020)
  - Total: 993
  - Density: 1,150/sq mi (445/km^{2})
- Time zone: UTC-6 (CST)
  - Summer (DST): UTC-5 (CDT)
- ZIP Code: 67480
- Area code: 785
- FIPS code: 20-66275
- GNIS ID: 2395908
- Website: City website

Solomon is a city in Dickinson and Saline counties in the U.S. state of Kansas. As of the 2020 census, the population of the city was 993. It is located approximately 6 miles west of Abilene.

== History ==
The first post office at Solomon was established in October, 1860.

Solomon was founded in 1866. It was named from its position near the mouth of the Solomon River. Solomon was incorporated as a city in 1871.

== Geography ==
According to the United States Census Bureau, the city has a total area of 0.85 square miles (2.20 km^{2}), all of it land.

== Demographics ==
Historical population
Census	Pop.	Note	%±
1880	618		—
1890	839		35.8%
1900	817		−2.6%
1910	949		16.2%
1920	1,071		12.9%
1930	1,032		−3.6%
1940	872		−15.5%
1950	834		−4.4%
1960	1,008		20.9%
1970	973		−3.5%
1980	1,018		4.6%
1990	939		−7.8%
2000	1,072		14.2%
2010	1,095		2.1%
2020	993		−9.3%
U.S. Decennial Census

The Saline County portion of Solomon is part of the Salina Micropolitan Statistical Area.

=== 2010 census ===
The result of the census of 2010, there were 1,095 people, 433 households, and 295 families living in the city. The population density was 1,288.2 inhabitants per square mile (497.4/km^{2}). There were 465 housing units at an average density of 547.1 per square mile (211.2/km^{2}). The racial makeup of the city was 96.1% White, 0.3% Native American, 0.2% Asian, 0.9% from other races, and 2.6% from two or more races. Hispanic or Latino of any race were 2.1% of the population.

There were 433 households, of which 35.8% had children under the age of 18 living with them, 52.0% were married couples living together, 11.1% had a female householder with no husband present, 5.1% had a male householder with no wife present, and 31.9% were non-families. 27.0% of all households were made up of individuals, and 12.7% had someone living alone who was 65 years of age or older. The average household size was 2.53 and the average family size was 3.08.

The median age in the city was 36.4 years. 27.7% of residents were under the age of 18; 8% were between the ages of 18 and 24; 27.8% were from 25 to 44; 22.6% were from 45 to 64; and 13.8% were 65 years of age or older. The gender makeup of the city was 49.5% male and 50.5% female.

=== 2000 census ===
As of the census of 2000, there were 1,072 people, 416 households, and 302 families living in the city. The population density was 1,634.8 inhabitants per square mile (631.2/km^{2}). There were 452 housing units at an average density of 689.3 per square mile (266.1/km^{2}). The racial makeup of the city was 98.32% White, 0.19% Native American, 0.09% Asian, 0.93% from other races, and 0.47% from two or more races. Hispanic or Latino of any race were 2.15% of the population.

There were 416 households, out of which 38.9% had children under the age of 18 living with them, 57.0% were married couples living together, 12.5% had a female householder with no husband present, and 27.2% were non-families. 23.3% of all households were made up of individuals, and 10.6% had someone living alone who was 65 years of age or older. The average household size was 2.56 and the average family size was 3.01.

In the city, the population was spread out, with 31.5% under the age of 18, 6.0% from 18 to 24, 29.8% from 25 to 44, 20.8% from 45 to 64, and 11.9% who were 65 years of age or older. The median age was 36 years. For every 100 females, there were 100.7 males. For every 100 females age 18 and over, there were 90.2 males.

The median income for a household in the city was $40,469, and the median income for a family was $48,203. Males had a median income of $34,926 versus $19,063 for females. The per capita income for the city was $16,800. About 8.6% of families and 13.6% of the population were below the poverty line, including 19.3% of those under age 18 and 9.0% of those age 65 or over.

== Economy ==
Solomon Corporation is the largest employer in Solomon. It is the largest rebuilder of oil-filled transformers in the United States.

Abilene Machine is located east of Solomon on Old Highway 40.

== Education ==
The community is served by Solomon USD 393 public school district.

== Notable people ==
See List of people from Dickinson County, Kansas

- Archie Butcher, head college football coach of Ottawa University
- Algo Henderson, president of Antioch College
- Kenneth McLeod, Canadian politician
- Seymour Stedman, lawyer and Socialist candidate for Vice-President of the United States

== See also ==
- Lincoln Township, Dickinson County, Kansas
