= Manning, Kansas =

Unincorporated community in Scott County, Kansas

- Unincorporated community
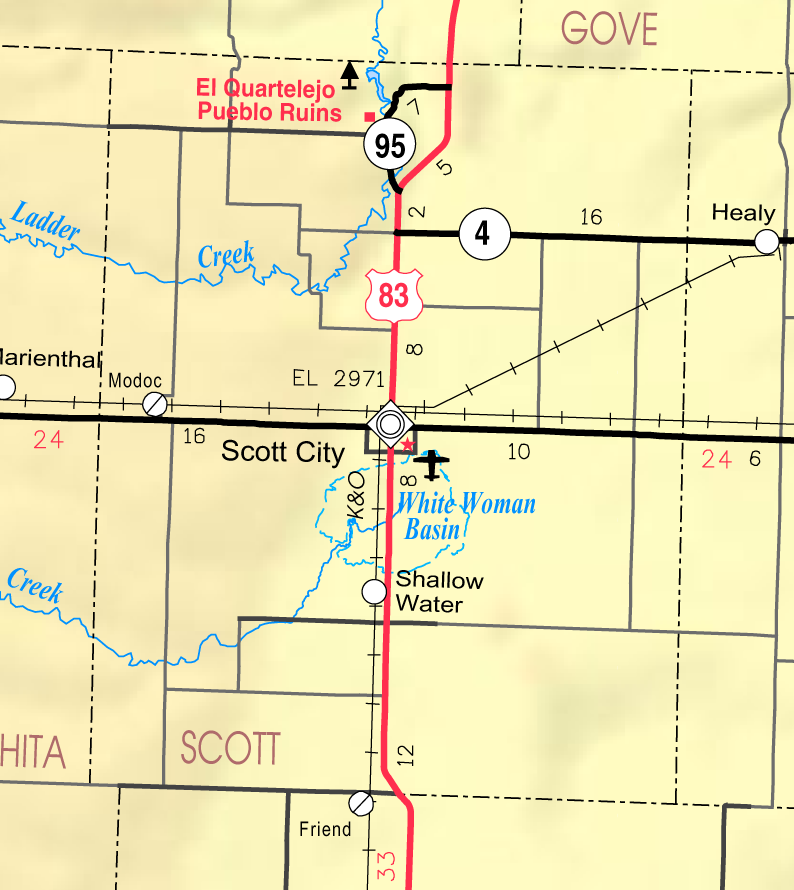
- KDOT map of Scott County (legend)

- Location within Kansas Location within the United States
- Coordinates: 38°33′19″N 100°43′25″W
- Country: United States
- State: Kansas
- County: Scott
- Elevation: 2,920 ft (890 m)
- Time zone: UTC-6 (CST)
  - Summer (DST): UTC-5 (CDT)
- Area code: 620
- FIPS code: 20-44325
- GNIS ID: 471466

Manning is an unincorporated community in Scott County, Kansas, United States.

== History ==
A post office was opened in Manning on December 20, 1887, and remained in operation until it was discontinued on June 30, 1955.
