= Scott County, Kansas =

County in Kansas, United States

- County
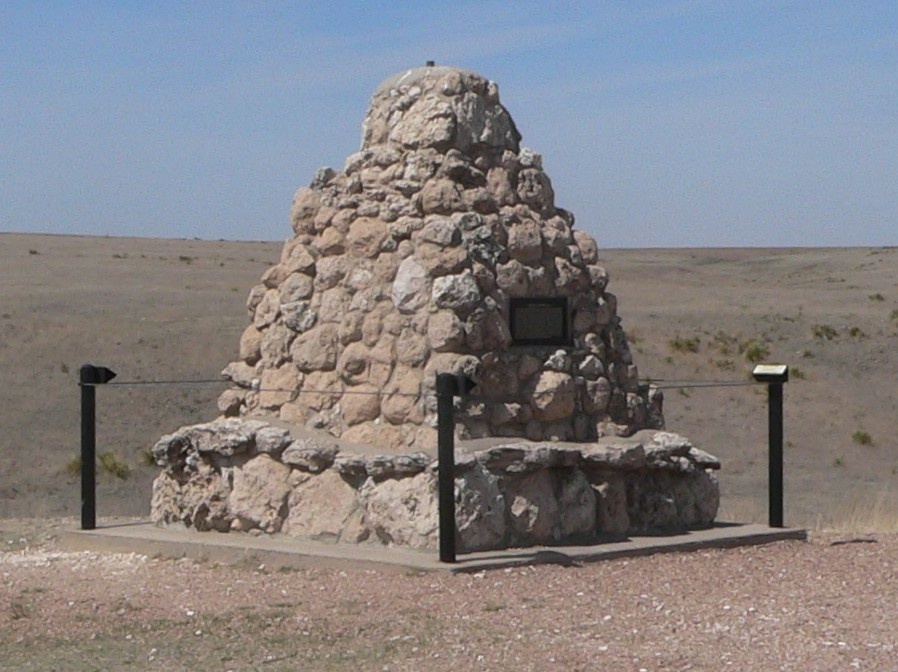
- Monument at Battle Canyon, site of the Battle of Punished Woman's Fork during the Northern Cheyenne Exodus of 1878

- Location within the U.S. state of Kansas
- Coordinates: 38°28′00″N 100°54′00″W
- Country: United States
- State: Kansas
- Founded: March 20, 1873
- Named for: Winfield Scott
- Seat: Scott City
- Largest city: Scott City

Area
  - Total: 718 sq mi (1,860 km^{2})
  - Land: 718 sq mi (1,860 km^{2})
  - Water: 0.1 sq mi (0.26 km^{2}) 0.02%

Population (2020)
  - Total: 5,151
  - Estimate (2025): 4,815 ▼
  - Density: 7.17/sq mi (2.77/km^{2})
- Time zone: UTC−6 (Central)
  - Summer (DST): UTC−5 (CDT)
- Congressional district: 1st
- Website: scottcountyks.com

Scott County is a county located in the U.S. state of Kansas. Its county seat is Scott City, the only incorporated city in the county. As of the 2020 census, the county population was 5,151. The county was named after Winfield Scott, a general in the United States Army from 1814 to 1861.

== History ==
=== Early history ===
For many millennia, the Great Plains of North America was inhabited by nomadic Native Americans. From the 16th century to 18th century, the Kingdom of France claimed ownership of large parts of North America. In 1762, after the French and Indian War, France secretly ceded New France to Spain, per the Treaty of Fontainebleau.

=== 19th century ===
In 1802, Spain returned most of the land to France, but keeping title to about 7,500 square miles. In 1803, most of the land for modern day Kansas was acquired by the United States from France as part of the 828,000 square mile Louisiana Purchase for 2.83 cents per acre.

In 1854, the Kansas Territory was organized, then in 1861 Kansas became the 34th U.S. state. In 1873, Scott County was established.

== Geography ==
According to the U.S. Census Bureau, the county has a total area of 718 square miles (1,860 km^{2}), of which 718 square miles (1,860 km^{2}) is land and 0.1 square miles (0.26 km^{2}) (0.02%) is water.

=== Adjacent counties ===
- Gove County (northeast)
- Lane County (east)
- Finney County (south)
- Kearny County (southwest)
- Wichita County (west)
- Logan County (northwest)

== Demographics ==
Historical population
Census	Pop.	Note	%±
1880	43		—
1890	1,262		2,834.9%
1900	1,098		−13.0%
1910	3,047		177.5%
1920	3,121		2.4%
1930	3,976		27.4%
1940	3,773		−5.1%
1950	4,921		30.4%
1960	5,228		6.2%
1970	5,606		7.2%
1980	5,782		3.1%
1990	5,289		−8.5%
2000	5,120		−3.2%
2010	4,936		−3.6%
2020	5,151		4.4%
2025 (est.)	4,815	▼	−6.5%
U.S. Decennial Census; 1790-1960 1900-1990; 1990-2000 2010-2020

=== 2020 census ===
As of the 2020 census, the county had a population of 5,151. The median age was 38.4 years. 26.2% of residents were under the age of 18 and 19.4% of residents were 65 years of age or older. For every 100 females there were 98.3 males, and for every 100 females age 18 and over there were 98.6 males age 18 and over.

The racial makeup of the county was 81.0% White, 0.3% Black or African American, 0.9% American Indian and Alaska Native, 0.3% Asian, 0.2% Native Hawaiian and Pacific Islander, 6.3% from some other race, and 11.1% from two or more races. Hispanic or Latino residents of any race comprised 19.9% of the population.

0.0% of residents lived in urban areas, while 100.0% lived in rural areas.

There were 2,013 households in the county, of which 33.3% had children under the age of 18 living with them and 20.6% had a female householder with no spouse or partner present. About 27.6% of all households were made up of individuals and 12.7% had someone living alone who was 65 years of age or older.

There were 2,260 housing units, of which 10.9% were vacant. Among occupied housing units, 69.8% were owner-occupied and 30.2% were renter-occupied. The homeowner vacancy rate was 1.7% and the rental vacancy rate was 10.3%.

=== 2000 census ===
As of the census of 2000, there were 5,120 people, 2,045 households, and 1,435 families residing in the county. The population density was 7 people per square mile (2.7 people/km^{2}). There were 2,291 housing units at an average density of 3 per square mile (1.2/km^{2}). The racial makeup of the county was 95.47% White, 0.10% Black or African American, 0.55% Native American, 0.12% Asian, 2.75% from other races, and 1.02% from two or more races. 6.31% of the population were Hispanic or Latino of any race.

There were 2,045 households, out of which 33.30% had children under the age of 18 living with them, 61.00% were married couples living together, 6.70% had a female householder with no husband present, and 29.80% were non-families. 27.30% of all households were made up of individuals, and 13.60% had someone living alone who was 65 years of age or older. The average household size was 2.46 and the average family size was 3.01.

In the county, the population was spread out, with 27.10% under the age of 18, 6.60% from 18 to 24, 25.30% from 25 to 44, 24.40% from 45 to 64, and 16.50% who were 65 years of age or older. The median age was 39 years. For every 100 females there were 97.10 males. For every 100 females age 18 and over, there were 94.40 males.

The median income for a household in the county was $40,534, and the median income for a family was $50,549. Males had a median income of $32,166 versus $20,221 for females. The per capita income for the county was $20,443. About 2.10% of families and 5.10% of the population were below the poverty line, including 6.00% of those under age 18 and 8.10% of those age 65 or over.

== Government ==
=== Presidential elections ===
Prior to 1940, Scott County was a swing county, voting for the national winner in every presidential election from 1904 to 1936. From 1940 on, it has become one of the most Republican counties in the entire nation, with Barry Goldwater in 1964 being the lone Republican candidate since then to be held to single-digit margin of victory in the county. In addition, each of the last eight presidential elections have resulted in the Republican candidate winning over 70 percent of the county's vote & the Democratic candidate being held under 20 percent.

Presidential election results

United States presidential election results for Scott County, Kansas
Year	Republican		Democratic		Third party(ies)	
Year	No.	%	No.	%	No.	%
1888	294	54.65%	182	33.83%	62	11.52%
1892	142	45.95%	0	0.00%	167	54.05%
1896	91	35.97%	161	63.64%	1	0.40%
1900	128	44.14%	159	54.83%	3	1.03%
1904	275	62.64%	79	18.00%	85	19.36%
1908	324	47.09%	294	42.73%	70	10.17%
1912	56	9.24%	247	40.76%	303	50.00%
1916	416	33.15%	684	54.50%	155	12.35%
1920	636	58.51%	379	34.87%	72	6.62%
1924	734	50.87%	445	30.84%	264	18.30%
1928	886	65.78%	450	33.41%	11	0.82%
1932	595	34.04%	1,092	62.47%	61	3.49%
1936	625	36.25%	1,096	63.57%	3	0.17%
1940	988	57.24%	717	41.54%	21	1.22%
1944	903	60.93%	565	38.12%	14	0.94%
1948	1,040	56.86%	739	40.40%	50	2.73%
1952	1,681	78.33%	443	20.64%	22	1.03%
1956	1,376	75.11%	451	24.62%	5	0.27%
1960	1,514	71.28%	598	28.15%	12	0.56%
1964	1,143	52.50%	1,016	46.67%	18	0.83%
1968	1,374	66.25%	500	24.11%	200	9.64%
1972	1,547	74.30%	449	21.57%	86	4.13%
1976	1,195	54.74%	919	42.10%	69	3.16%
1980	1,829	75.64%	456	18.86%	133	5.50%
1984	2,017	81.13%	427	17.18%	42	1.69%
1988	1,590	66.95%	717	30.19%	68	2.86%
1992	1,426	56.27%	480	18.94%	628	24.78%
1996	1,750	73.41%	458	19.21%	176	7.38%
2000	1,811	78.64%	418	18.15%	74	3.21%
2004	1,924	83.69%	347	15.09%	28	1.22%
2008	1,823	83.66%	321	14.73%	35	1.61%
2012	1,728	84.21%	277	13.50%	47	2.29%
2016	1,865	84.70%	236	10.72%	101	4.59%
2020	2,014	85.56%	299	12.70%	41	1.74%
2024	1,843	86.32%	248	11.62%	44	2.06%

=== Laws ===
Although the Kansas Constitution was amended in 1986 to allow the sale of alcoholic liquor by the individual drink with the approval of voters, Scott County has remained a prohibition, or "dry", county, with 3.2% cereal-malt beverages available in grocery stores.

== Education ==
=== Unified school districts ===
There are two school districts that have territory in the county. Scott County USD 466 has almost all of the land, while one small piece is in Healy Public Schools USD 468.

- Scott County USD 466

=== Library ===
The Scott County Public Library is located at 110 West 8th in Scott City. The Scott County Library was the first free county public library in the state of Kansas. It was started in September 1923 with the five members of the library committee each checking out a book for herself and one for her husband thus the library checked out ten books on the first day that it was open. Two rooms on the second floor of the Cretcher Lumber Company office building were made available for the library. L. W. Cretcher, owner of the lumber yard, gave the library a boost by painting the rooms, furnishing a stove, shelves, cupboards, lights, and free rent. In November 1924 a proposal was placed on the ballot for the library to be a county funded entity. A room was set aside in the basement of the newly built courthouse for the library, which at that time possessed 861 books. The library in the courthouse was opened to the public in July 1925. The library remained in the basement of the Scott County Courthouse until a separate library building was constructed at 110 West 8th Street in 1964. This building was 4,150 square feet (386 m^{2}) with a 660-square-foot (61 m^{2}) meeting room available to the public. In 2004, the Scott County Library Board began a fundraising effort for a Library Building expansion of 7,350 feet (2,240 m). The Library expansion and remodel to 12,160 square feet (1,130 m^{2}) was completed in May 2009.

== Communities ==
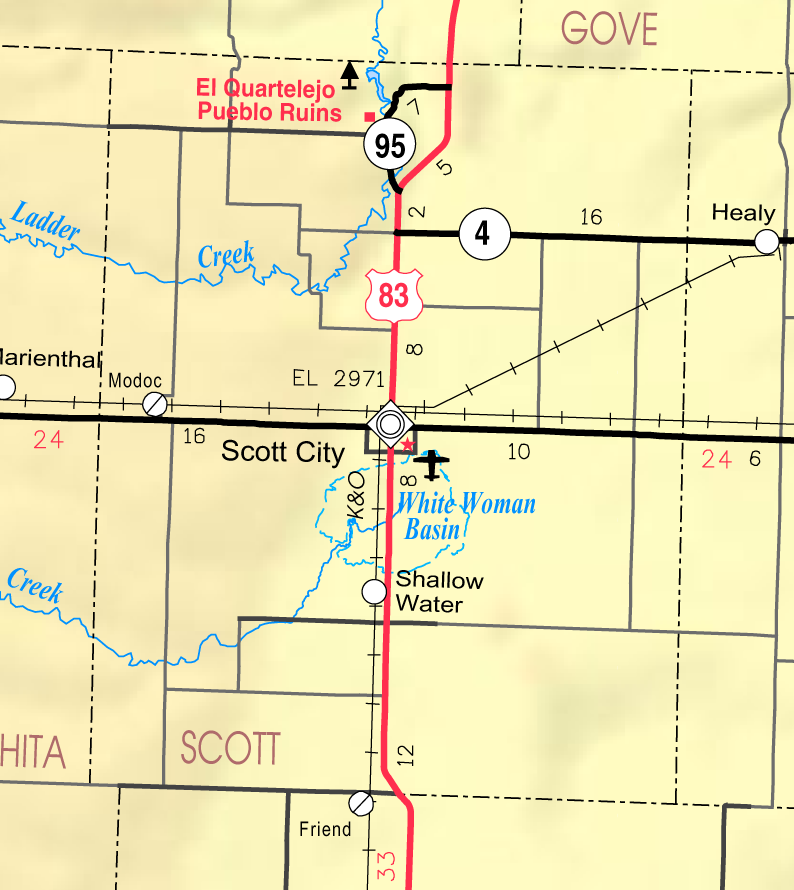
2005 map of Scott County (map legend)

List of townships / incorporated cities / unincorporated communities / extinct former communities within Scott County.
† means a community is designated a Census-Designated Place (CDP) by the United States Census Bureau.

=== Cities ===
- Scott City (county seat)

=== Unincorporated communities ===
- Chevron
- Grigston
- Hutchins
- Manning
- Modoc
- Pence
- Shallow Water†

=== Townships ===
Scott County is divided into seven townships. Scott City is considered governmentally independent and is excluded from the census figures for the townships. In the following table, the population center is the largest city (or cities) included in that township's population total, if it is of a significant size.

Sources: 2000 U.S. Gazetteer from the U.S. Census Bureau.
Township	FIPS	Population center	Population	Population density /km^{2} (/sq mi)	Land area km^{2} (sq mi)	Water area km^{2} (sq mi)	Water %	Geographic coordinates
Beaver	05175		302	1 (3)	309 (119)	0 (0)	0.10%	38°37′11″N 100°59′58″W
Isbel	34575		110	1 (1)	206 (80)	0 (0)	0%	38°28′52″N 101°2′52″W
Keystone	36600		106	1 (1)	206 (80)	0 (0)	0%	38°30′17″N 100°45′4″W
Lake	37850		95	0 (1)	311 (120)	0 (0)	0%	38°20′23″N 100°49′39″W
Michigan	46175		88	0 (1)	308 (119)	0 (0)	0%	38°36′23″N 100°48′23″W
Scott	63575		309	2 (4)	202 (78)	0 (0)	0%	38°29′31″N 100°55′0″W
Valley	73125		255	1 (2)	311 (120)	0 (0)	0%	38°21′6″N 100°58′13″W

== See also ==
- El Cuartelejo Apache and Puebloan site
- Lake Scott State Park
- Dry counties

Community information for Kansas

- Kansas locations by per capita income
- List of counties in Kansas
- List of townships in Kansas
- List of cities in Kansas
- List of unincorporated communities in Kansas
- List of ghost towns in Kansas
