= Big Spring =

Big Spring may refer to:

== Communities ==
- Big Spring, Montgomery County, Missouri, a census-designated place
- Big Spring, Carter County, Tennessee, an unincorporated community
- Big Spring, Meigs County, Tennessee, an unincorporated community
- Big Spring, Wilson County, Tennessee, a ghost town
- Big Spring, Texas, a city in and the county seat of Howard County
  - Big Spring Independent School District, in Big Spring, Texas
- Big Spring, Wisconsin, an unincorporated community
- Big Spring School District, in Newville, Pennsylvania
- Big Spring Township, Ohio
- Big Spring Township, Shelby County, Illinois

== Other ==
- Big Spring (Michigan), a spring also called Kitch-iti-kipi, in Palms Book State Park, Schoolcraft County, Michigan
- Big Spring (Missouri), a natural spring (hydrosphere) in the Missouri Ozarks
- Big Spring (Pennsylvania), a historical site in Clearfield County, Pennsylvania
- Big Spring Bombers, a defunct minor league baseball team formerly located in Big Spring, Texas
- Big Spring Cafe, a greasy spoon restaurant located in Huntsville, Alabama
- Big Spring Creek (Montana), four streams in Montana
- Big Spring Creek (Pennsylvania), a tributary of Conodoguinet Creek in Cumberland County, Pennsylvania
- Big Spring Jam, an annual music festival in Huntsville, Alabama
- Big Spring Vietnam Memorial, a war memorial in Big Spring, Texas, honoring American servicemen
- Tuscumbia, Alabama was called Big Spring 1821–22

== See also ==
- Big Spring Park (disambiguation)
- Big Spring State Park (disambiguation)
- Big Springs (disambiguation)
