= David Castle =

David Castle may refer to:

- David S. Castle (1884–1956), architect in Texas
- David Castle (musician) (born 1952), American singer, musician and songwriter.
- David Castle (philosopher) (born 1967), Canadian philosopher and bioethicist
- David Castle (cricketer) (born 1972), former cricketer
