= Mitchell County Courthouse =

Mitchell County Courthouse may refer to:

- Mitchell County Courthouse (Georgia), part of the Camilla Commercial Historic District, Camilla, Georgia
- Mitchell County Courthouse (Iowa), Osage, Iowa
- Mitchell County Courthouse (Kansas), Beloit, Kansas
- Mitchell County Courthouse (North Carolina), Bakersville, North Carolina
- Mitchell County Courthouse (Texas), Colorado City, Texas
