= Big Spring Township =

Big Spring Township may refer to:

- Big Spring Township, Izard County, Arkansas
- Big Spring Township, Shelby County, Illinois
- Big Spring Township, Ohio

== See also ==
- Big Spring (disambiguation)
