= Big Spring Park =

Big Spring Park is the name of several parks:

- Big Spring Park (Cedartown, Georgia)
- Big Spring Park (Huntsville, Alabama)
- Big Spring Park (Neosho, Missouri)
- Big Spring State Park (Texas)
- Big Spring State Forest Picnic Area Pennsylvania
- Big Spring State Park (disambiguation)

== See also ==
- Big Spring (disambiguation)
