= National Register of Historic Places listings in Howard County, Texas =

Location of Howard County in Texas

This is a list of the National Register of Historic Places listings in Howard County, Texas.

This is intended to be a complete list of properties listed on the National Register of Historic Places in Howard County, Texas. There are six properties listed on the National Register in the county. Two properties are Recorded Texas Historic Landmarks, and one is also a State Antiquities Landmark.

This National Park Service list is complete through NPS recent listings posted May 1, 2026.

== Current listings ==
The locations of National Register properties may be seen in a mapping service provided.

	Name on the Register	Image	Date listed	Location	City or town	Description
1	Big Spring Downtown Historic District		August 26, 2024 (#100009055)	Roughly bounded by 1st, Goliad, 6th, and South Gregg Sts. 32°15′11″N 101°28′31″W	Big Spring	
2	Big Spring Hospital	Big Spring Hospital	October 6, 2023 (#100009404)	810 Goliad St. 32°14′56″N 101°28′11″W	Big Spring	
3	Big Spring Veterans Administration Hospital	Big Spring Veterans Administration Hospital	October 24, 2022 (#100008282)	300 Veterans Blvd. 32°13′54″N 101°28′18″W	Big Spring	
4	Petroleum Building		April 21, 2021 (#100006397)	111 Scurry St. 32°15′12″N 101°28′42″W	Big Spring	
5	Potton-Hayden House	Potton-Hayden House	April 14, 1975 (#75001992)	SW corner Gregg and 2nd Sts. 32°15′00″N 101°28′42″W	Big Spring	State Antiquities Landmark, Recorded Texas Historic Landmark
6	Settles Hotel	Settles Hotel	April 16, 2013 (#13000207)	200 E. 3rd St. 32°15′10″N 101°28′31″W	Big Spring	Recorded Texas Historic Landmark

== See also ==
- National Register of Historic Places listings in Texas
- Recorded Texas Historic Landmarks in Howard County
