= 24fps =

24fps may refer to:

- 24p, a film and video format that operates at 24 frames per second
- 24FPS International Short Film Festival, a film festival in Abilene, Texas
- 24fps, a short film directed by Jeremy Podeswa
