= Grayson County Courthouse =

Grayson County Courthouse may refer to:

- Grayson County Courthouse (Kentucky), Leitchfield, Kentucky
- Grayson County Courthouse (Texas), Sherman, Texas
- Grayson County Courthouse (Virginia), Independence, Virginia
