= Potton–Hayden House =

Historic house in Texas, United States

- U.S. National Register of Historic Places
- Texas State Antiquities Landmark
- Recorded Texas Historic Landmark
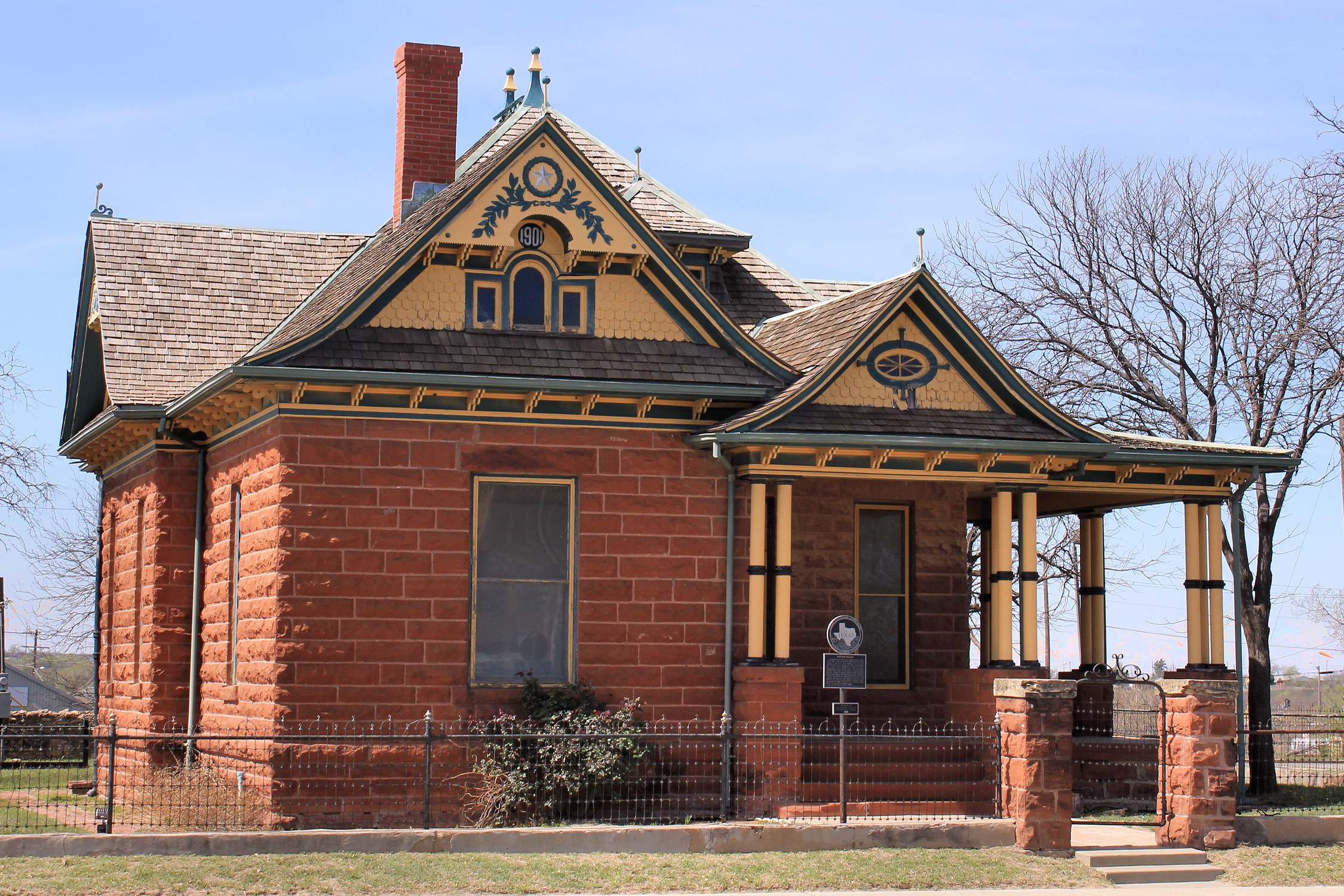

- Location within Texas Location within the United States
- Location: SW corner Gregg and 2nd Sts., Big Spring, Texas
- Coordinates: 32°15′0″N 101°28′42″W
- Area: 0.5 acres (0.20 ha)
- Built: 1901
- Architectural style: Queen Anne
- NRHP reference No.: 75001992
- TSAL No.: 370
- RTHL No.: 4100

Significant dates
- Added to NRHP: April 14, 1975
- Designated TSAL: May 28, 1981
- Designated RTHL: 1976

The Potton–Hayden House is a historic house in Big Spring, Texas, USA. It was built in 1901. It has been listed on the National Register of Historic Places since April 14, 1975.

The house is owned by the Heritage Museum of Big Spring and open for tours by appointment.

== See also ==
- National Register of Historic Places listings in Howard County, Texas
- Recorded Texas Historic Landmarks in Howard County
