= Hotel Wooten =

Coordinates: 32.4518°N 99.7344°W

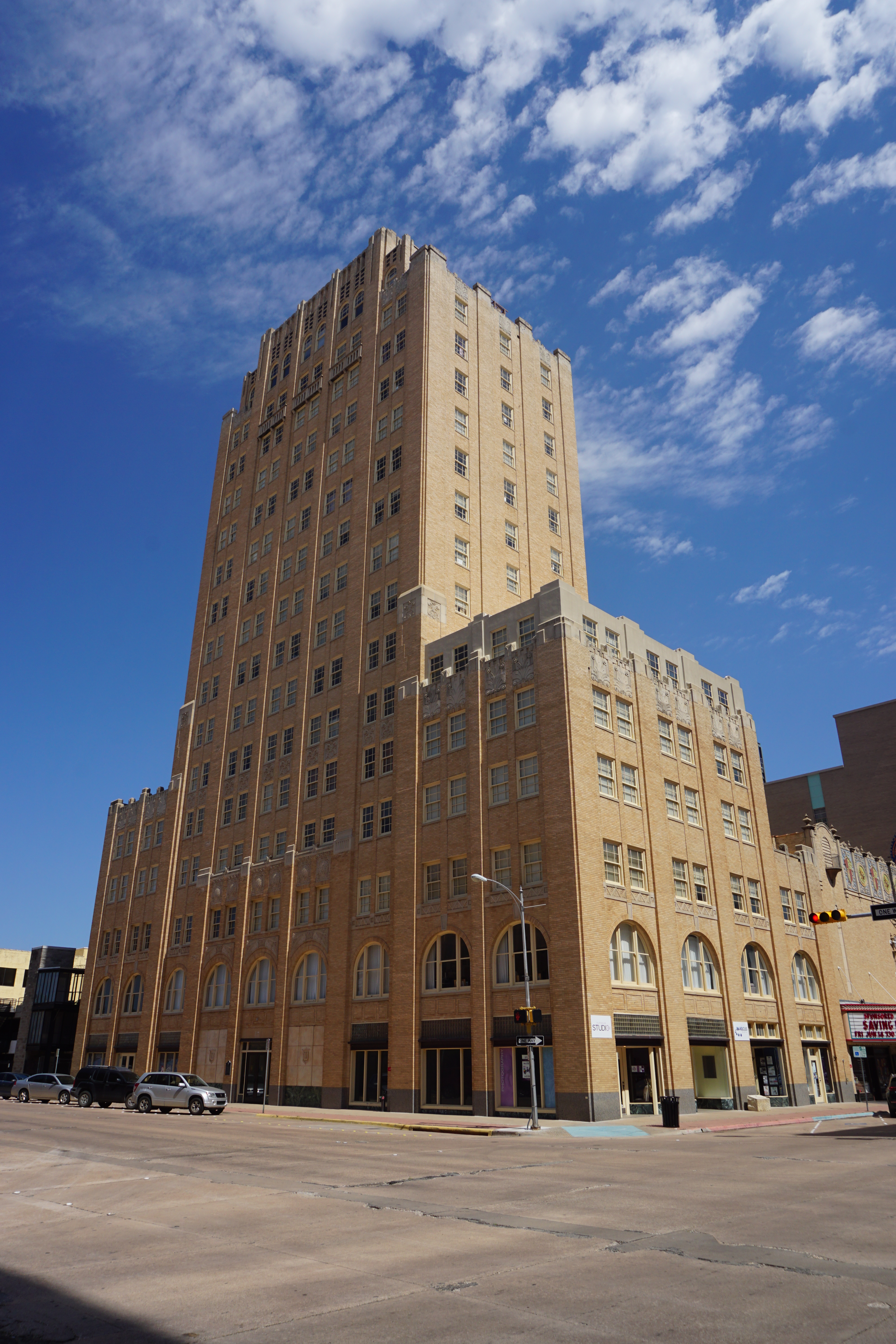
- Interactive map of the Hotel Wooten area

General information
- Type: Residential
- Location: 1102 North 3rd Street, Abilene, Texas, United States
- Construction started: 1929
- Completed: 1930
- Opening: 1930

Height
- Roof: 208 ft (63 m)

Technical details
- Floor count: 16

Design and construction
- Architects: David S. Castle & Co., Abilene, Texas

Website
- hotelwooten.com

The Hotel Wooten is located in downtown Abilene, Texas, United States at 1102 North 3rd Street.

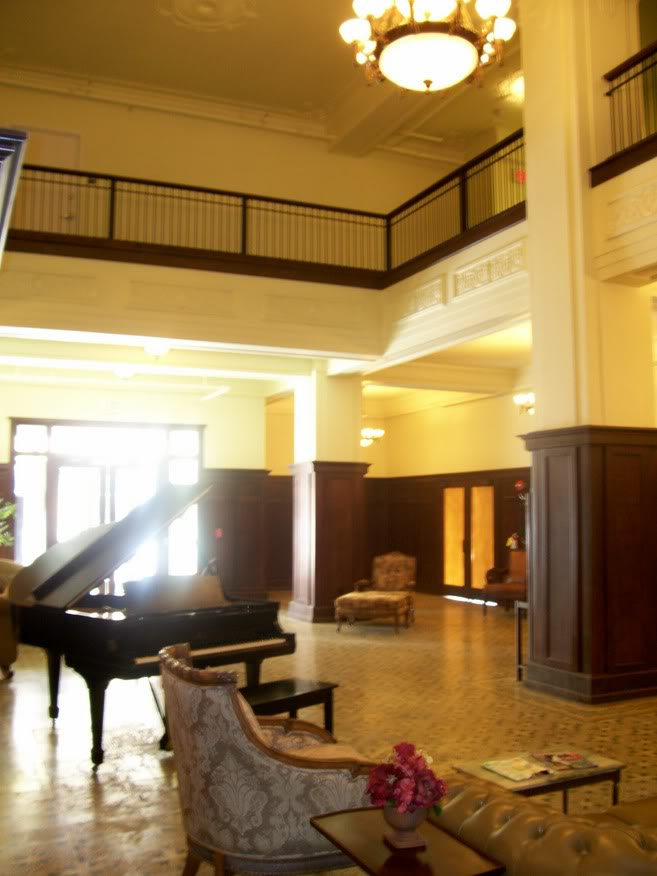
The building's grand lobby

This graceful 16-story tower was built at the corner of North 3rd and Cypress Street in 1930 by local business man H.O. Wooten, who according to local legend paid cash for the construction in the midst of the Great Depression. With its massive blue and red neon sign atop its roof, the hotel was visible for miles on the flat Texas plains, particularly at night. Additionally, the soaring tower created a wind current at 3rd and Cypress that would raise skirts on blustery days, attracting crowds of young male onlookers as well as skirted ladies eager to be looked on. In response to the growing indecency of the Wooten corner (variously nicknamed "Ankle Acre," "Bloomers Block," and "Wooten's Whoopsy-Daisy"), the Abilene city council resurrected an antique city ordinance which forbade the ogling of unescorted ladies, but which failed to settle the legal status of wind. The efficacy of this ordinance is a matter of some debate.

Indeed, the Wooten was very much at the center of the Abilene social scene for much of the middle part of the twentieth century. By the 1970s, however, commerce had shifted south as Abilene burgeoning population spread ever outward. The hotel, along with much of downtown Abilene, fell into a state of disgrace and disrepair. For several years, the Wooten was rechristened "The Abilene Towers Apartments." It became notorious for the chunks of masonry and debris that would often rain down on unsuspecting pedestrians below as it crumbled beneath the west Texas sun. Finally, just as it seemed doomed to inevitably erode beyond the possibility of restoration, the Wooten was swept up in the revitalization that had already consumed much of downtown, starting with Wooten's neighbor, The Paramount Theater. The tower underwent a complete overhaul in 2005 by the Beaumont Texas Contractor Daniels Building and Construction and is now an apartment building. In spite of all legislative efforts, the wearing of skirts and the ogling thereof continues apace.
