= Big Spring State Park =

Big Spring State Park can refer to either of two state parks in the United States:

- Big Spring State Park (Texas)
- Big Spring State Forest Picnic Area in Pennsylvania

== See also ==
- Big Spring Park
