= 24FPS International Short Film Festival =

Film festival

- Location: Abilene, Texas
- Founded: 1999
- Hosted by: Paramount Theatre
- No. of films: 28
- Language: English
- Website: 24fpsfest.com

The 24FPS International Short Film Festival (formerly WESTfest) is a two-day short film festival hosted in Abilene, Texas each year. An average of 20 shorts are selected and viewed at the Paramount Theatre, a restored theatre originally built in 1930.
