= Big Springs =

Big Springs may refer to:

== Settlements in the United States ==
- Big Springs, the original name of Harpersville, Alabama
- Big Springs, California
- Big Springs, Indiana
- Big Springs, Kansas
- Big Springs, Nebraska
- Big Springs, the original name of Caledonia (village), New York
- Big Springs, Ohio

== Bodies of water in the United States ==
- Big Springs (Idaho)
- Big Springs, an early name of the Las Vegas Springs oasis
- Big Springs (California), a tributary at the source of the Owens River

== See also ==
- Big Spring (disambiguation)
