= Mitchell County Courthouse (Texas) =

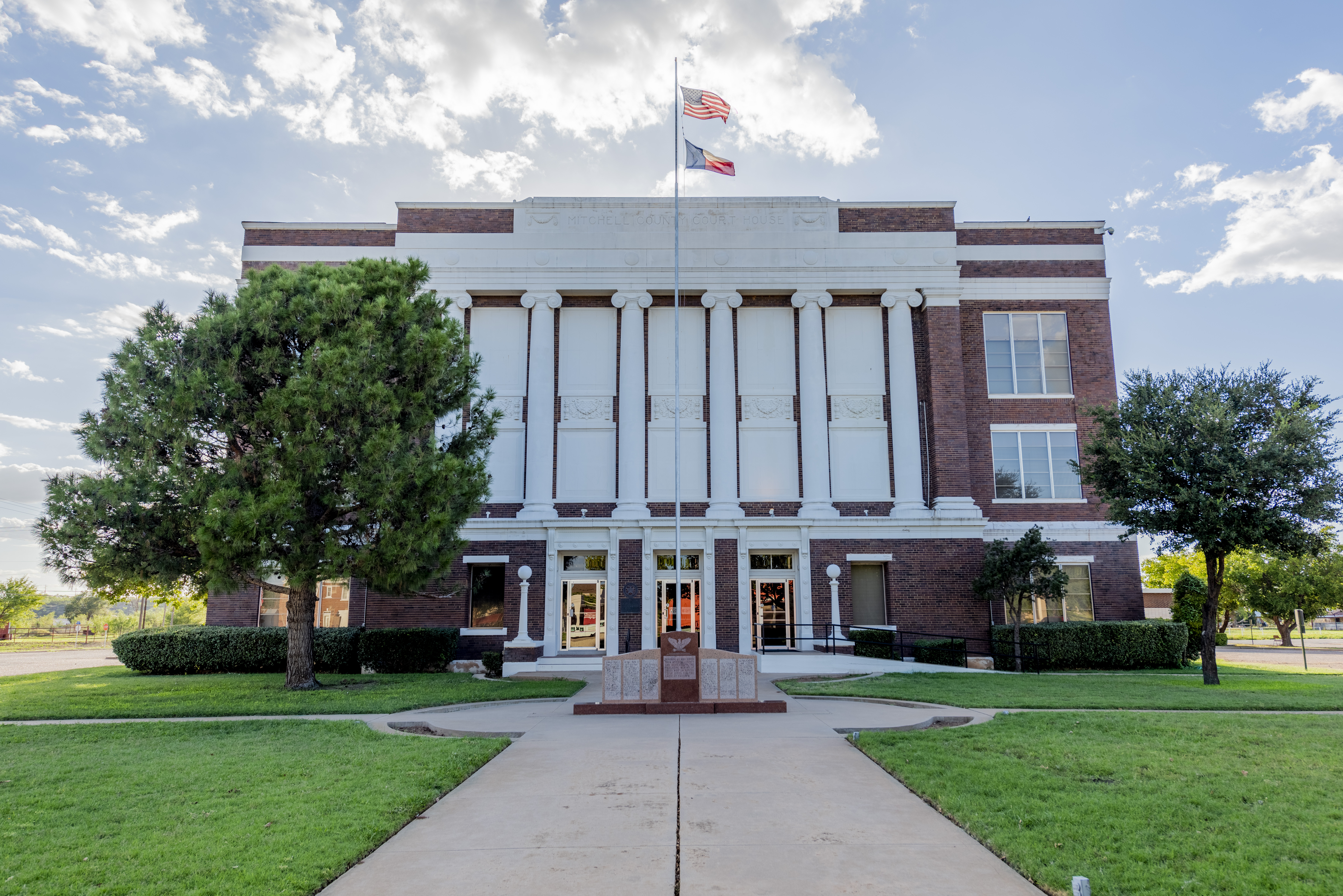
- Mitchell County Courthouse in 2020

- Location within Texas Mitchell County Courthouse (the United States)

General information
- Architectural style: Classical Revival
- Location: 349 Oak St., Colorado City, Texas
- Coordinates: 32°23′25″N 100°52′08″W
- Completed: 1924
- Renovated: 1965

Technical details
- Material: Brick, limestone
- Floor count: 3

Design and construction
- Architect: David S. Castle
- Main contractor: J.H. Reddick

The Mitchell County Courthouse, built ca. 1924, is an historic 3-story redbrick Classical Revival style courthouse building located at 349 Oak Street in Colorado City, Texas. It was designed by David S. Castle, who has been called the Architect of Abilene, and built by J.H. Reddick. It is Mitchell County's second courthouse and replaced the first courthouse built in 1883, which was torn down after it was discovered to have been built in the right-of-way of Oak Street. Sometime after 1939, the 10 windows in the portico were covered over.

== See also ==
- List of county courthouses in Texas
