= Hotel Settles =

Hotel in Big Spring, Texas

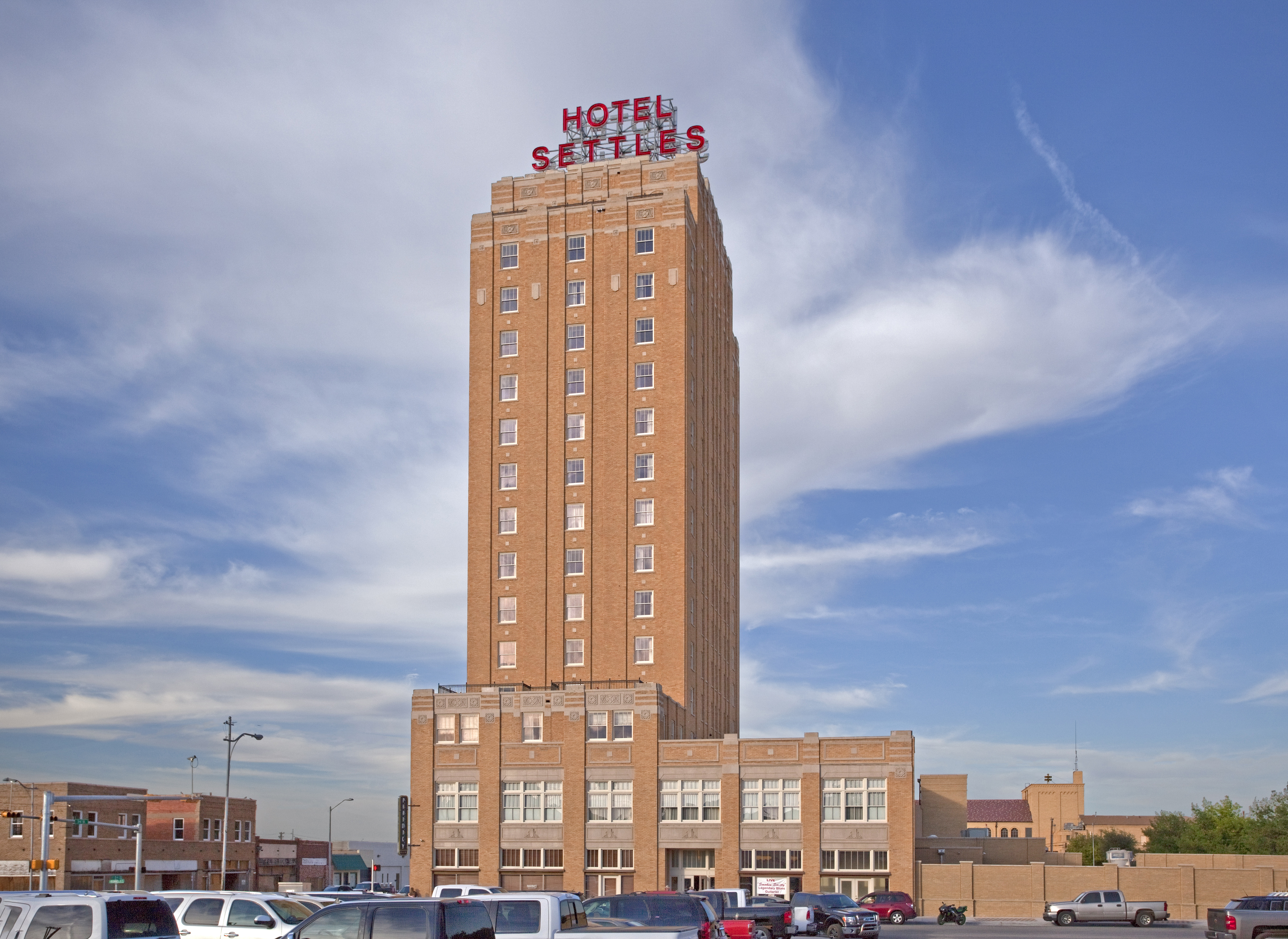
- Interactive map of the Hotel Settles area
- Alternative names: Settles Hotel

General information
- Status: Open
- Location: Big Spring, Texas, United States, 200 E. Third St., Big Spring, Texas, United States
- Coordinates: 32°15′10″N 101°28′31″W
- Completed: October 1, 1930
- Renovated: December, 2012
- Renovation cost: $30 million United States dollar
- Owner: Settles Hotel Development Corporation

Height
- Height: 174 feet (53 m)

Technical details
- Floor count: 15

Website
- SettlesHotel.com
- Settles Hotel
- U.S. National Register of Historic Places
- Recorded Texas Historic Landmark
- Location within Texas Location within the United States
- Architect: David S. Castle
- Architectural style: Art Deco
- NRHP reference No.: 13000207
- RTHL No.: 13722

Significant dates
- Added to NRHP: April 18, 2013
- Designated RTHL: 1987

The Hotel Settles is a historic 15-story hotel located at 200 East Third Street in Big Spring, Texas. Originally completed in 1930, the Settles opened for business October 1, 1930. It operated from 1930 until the early 1980s, and was subsequently abandoned for around 30 years, before reopening in late 2012.

The building was purchased by the Settles Hotel Development Corporation in late 2006. Since that time, the SHDC has also acquired adjoining properties, including the Big Spring Boys and Girls Club and the abandoned Greyhound Bus terminal, which was then demolished.

The building was listed on the National Register of Historic Places on April 18, 2013. Hotel Settles is a member of Historic Hotels of America, the official program of the National Trust for Historic Preservation.

== Reopening ==
The Hotel Settles re-opened its doors to the public on December 28, 2012. Construction on other parts of the Hotel continued through 2013.

On April 10, 2015, the West Texas Historical Association at its 92nd annual conference in Amarillo, presented a lecture and discussion on the Hotel Settles: "A Grand Dame Shines Again: Big Spring's Hotel Settles During Eighty-five Years of Boom, Bust, and Boom" by Barbara Brannon.

== See also ==
- National Register of Historic Places listings in Howard County, Texas
- Recorded Texas Historic Landmarks in Howard County
