= Hardin County Courthouse (Texas) =

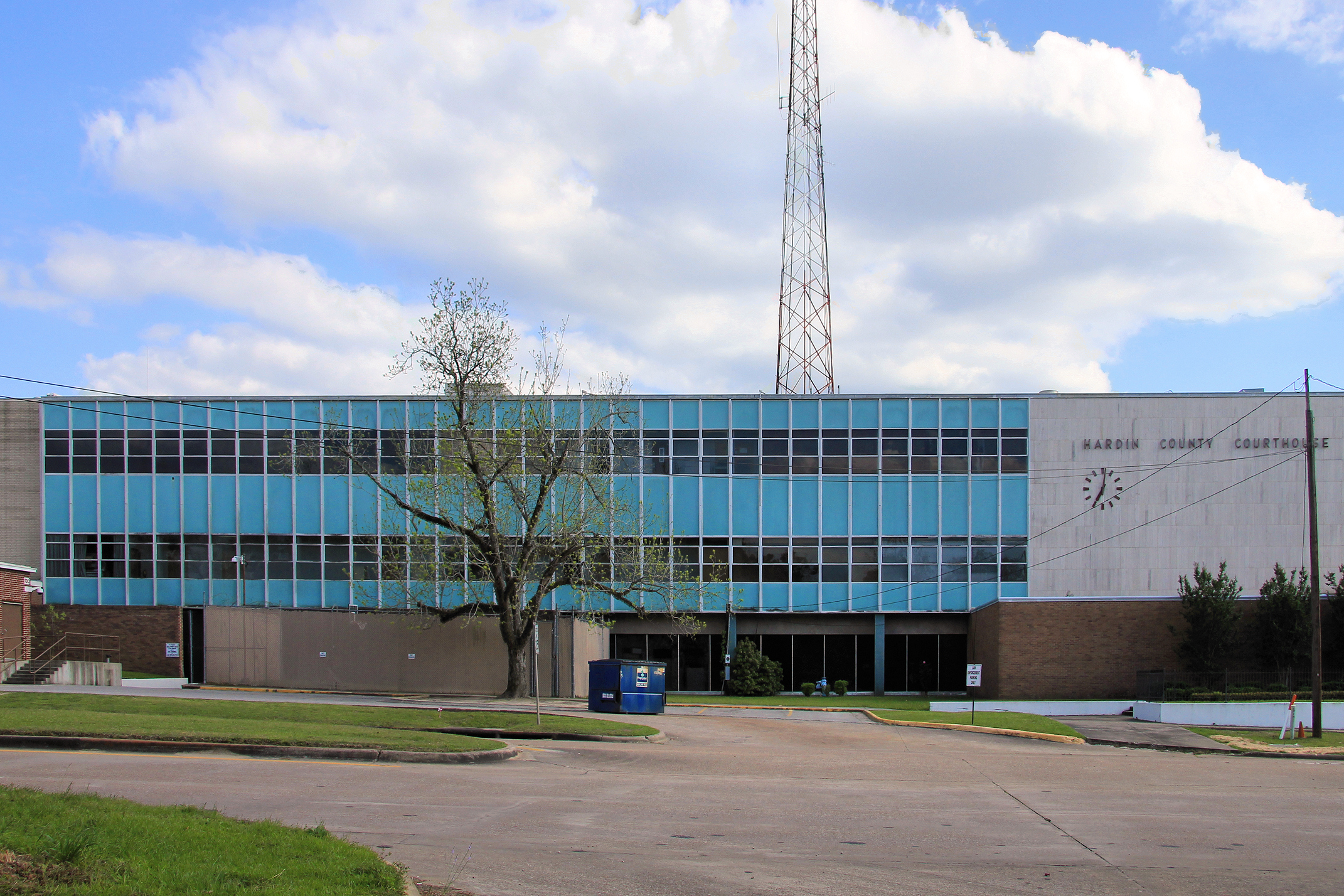
- Hardin County Courthouse in 2014

- Location within Texas Hardin County Courthouse (the United States)

General information
- Architectural style: Modern
- Location: 300 W. Monroe St., Kountze, Texas
- Coordinates: 30°22′06″N 94°18′58″W
- Completed: 1959
- Renovated: 1978

Technical details
- Material: Brick

Design and construction
- Architecture firm: Dickson, Dickson & Assoc.

The Hardin County Courthouse is the courthouse of Hardin County in Kountze, Texas.

The current structure was built in 1959. It is preceded by three other courthouses, no longer existing, constructed in 1859, 1872, and 1904.

In 2013, it was named one of the "Five Of The Ugliest Texas County Courthouses" by Houstonia magazine.

== See also ==
- List of county courthouses in Texas
