= Paramount Theatre (Abilene, Texas) =

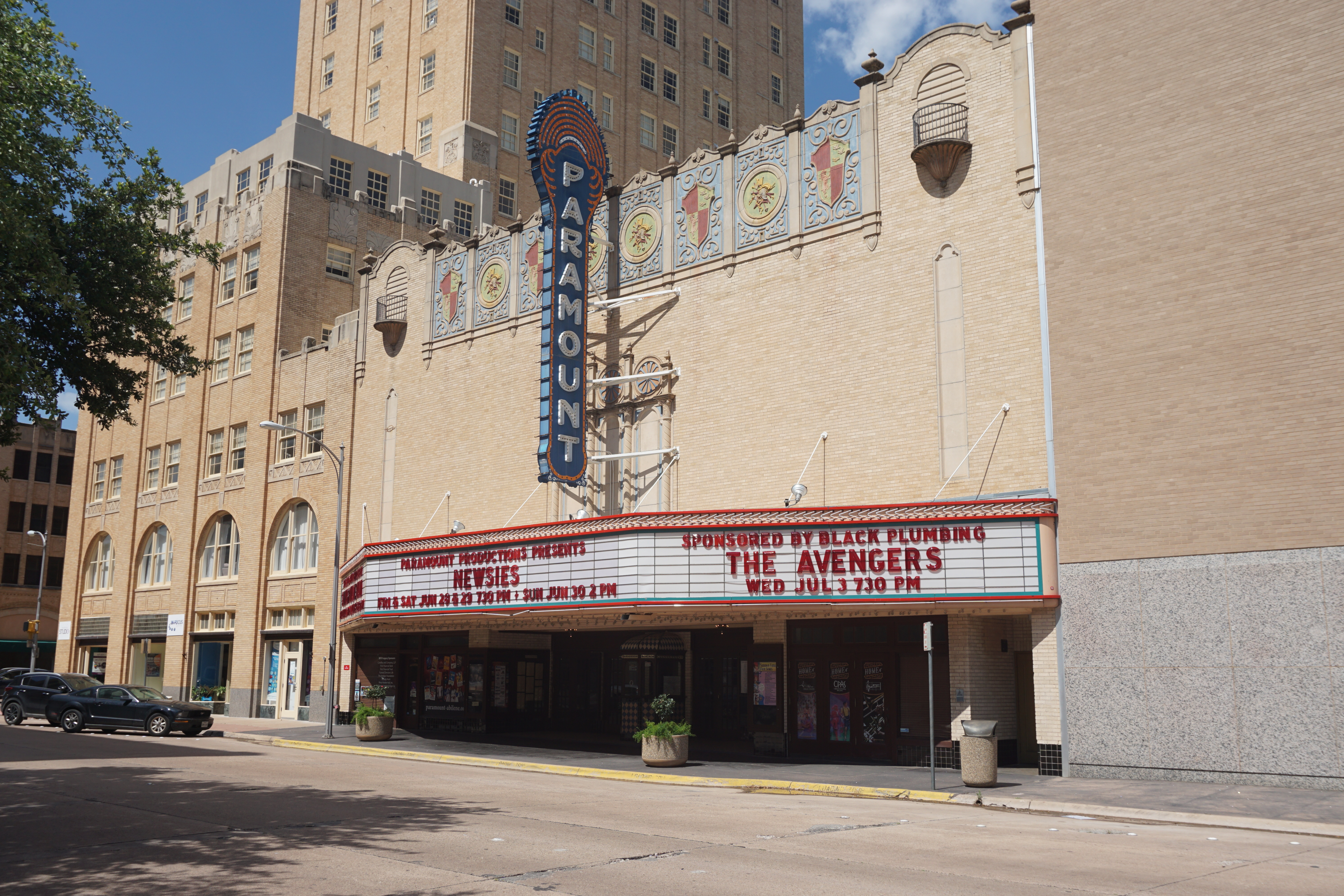
- Interactive map of Paramount Theatre
- Address: 352 Cypress Street; Abilene, Texas; United States
- Coordinates: 32°27′8″N 99°44′2″W
- Capacity: 1,187 (Originally 1,500)

Construction
- Opened: May 19th, 1930; 96 years ago
- Architects: David S. Castle & Co., Abilene, Texas

Website
- www.paramountabilene.com
- Paramount Theatre
- U.S. National Register of Historic Places
- Location within Texas Location within the United States
- Area: less than one acre
- Built: 1929
- Architectural style: Mission/Spanish Revival
- NRHP reference No.: 82001739
- Added to NRHP: December 27, 1982

The Paramount Theatre is located in downtown Abilene, Texas at 352 Cypress Street.

The Paramount was built in 1930 by H. O. Wooten, adjacent to his Hotel Wooten. The theatre opened on May 19, 1930, and the first film shown was Safety in Numbers. On February 12, 1931, Universal Pictures selected the Abilene Paramount, along with a few others in the Interstate Theatre chain, to exhibit the 1931 horror film Dracula, a full two days before its Valentine's Day premiere. The Paramount continued to operate as a movie theater until the 1970s, when the decline of downtown Abilene resulted in declining box office revenue. The theater was closed in 1979 for the first time since its opening. The Abilene Preservation League formed the Paramount Committee to prevent the building from imminent demolition by working with the National Register of Historic Places. The Paramount was later restored with funding from Julia Matthews and the Dodge Jones Foundation in 1986. The Paramount currently features films, live theatre performances, 1,187 split-aisle seats, a Spanish-Moorish interior, and a domed ceiling with moving clouds and glittering stars.

At the Paramount, visitors can catch performances featuring the Abilene Ballet Theatre, the Abilene Opera association, the Celebration Singers, the Abilene Children's Performing Arts Series, Abilene Community Band, the Classical Chorus of Abilene, and a large variety of professional and amateur shows.

The venue also produces live theatrical shows. In 1993, the Paramount began putting together the annual Paramount Summer Musical. Every summer, for decades the theatre has put on productions casting local amateur actors, and employing some of the best musicians, choreographers, set designers, and costumers from the area. The theatre has also worked closely with all three local university theatre departments. In 2003, the Paramount began an annual children's show each January. And in 2016 the theatre began staging a play each September.

The Paramount is best known as a movie house. The annual Paramount Film Series has shown hundreds of films since the relaunch of the theatre in 1987. In 2019, over 14,000 people came to see a movie at the Paramount.

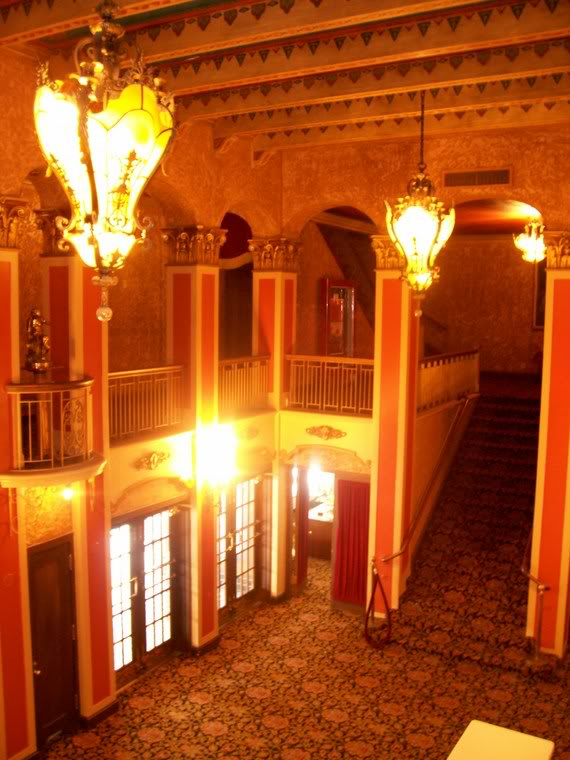
The theater's lobby

== See also ==
- National Register of Historic Places listings in Taylor County, Texas
