= Grayson County Courthouse (Texas) =

Coordinates: 33.6359°N 96.6097°W

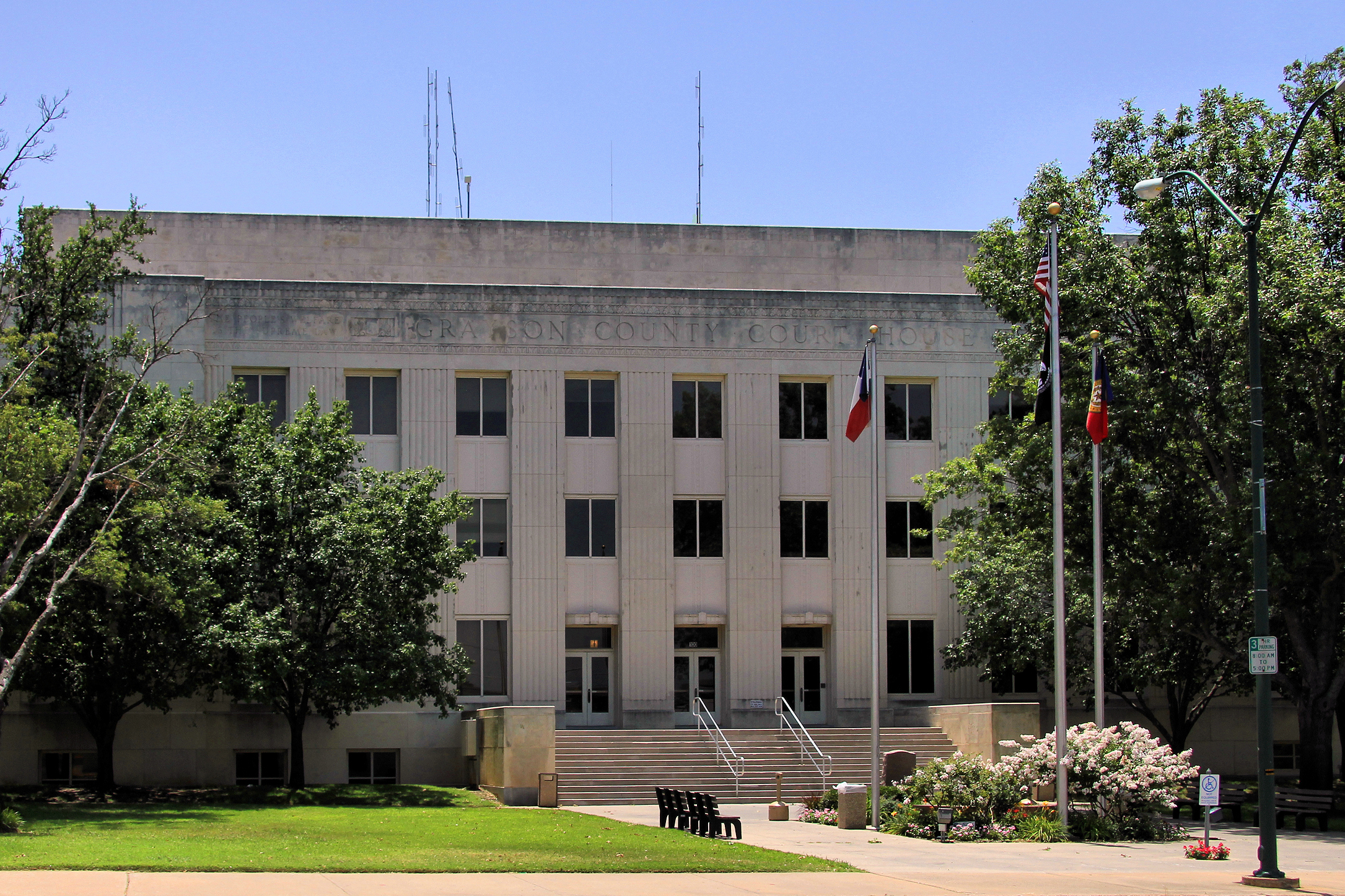

The Grayson County Courthouse in Sherman, Texas was built in 1936 in Moderne style.

== History ==
It was designed by architects Voelcker and Dixon and is built of concrete and limestone.

Grayson County, established in 1846, has had seven courthouses, with three during 1847 to 1853, then successors built in 1853, 1859, 1876, and 1936.

The previous Grayson County Courthouse was burned by a lynch mob on May 9, 1930, killing a black man who had been accused of raping a white woman.

== See also ==
- List of county courthouses in Texas
