= Big Spring Vietnam Memorial =

Coordinates: 32.229272°N 101.498389°W

The Big Spring Vietnam Memorial is a war memorial located in Big Spring, Texas, United States, honoring American servicemen (especially those local to Big Spring) who gave their lives, became prisoners of war or went missing in action in the Vietnam War.

Dedicated May 27, 1991, the black granite memorial monument measures 9.5 feet (2.9 m) by 6 feet (1.8 m) by 6 feet (1.8 m), a map of Vietnam, and a POW-MIA logo.

The 2-acre (8,100 m^{2}) park surrounding the memorial also contains a UH-1 "Huey" MEDEVAC helicopter, an F-4E Phantom II fighter jet, an AH-1 Cobra attack helicopter, and a M60 Patton tank.

The Gold Star Memorial Chapel, built on the site, displays pictures of servicemen from Big Spring and Howard County who were killed in action and missing in action. It also displays pictures of servicemen killed in action from the surrounding area. Also pictured are men and women who served their country, whether they were in a combat zone or not.
