= David S. Castle =

American architect

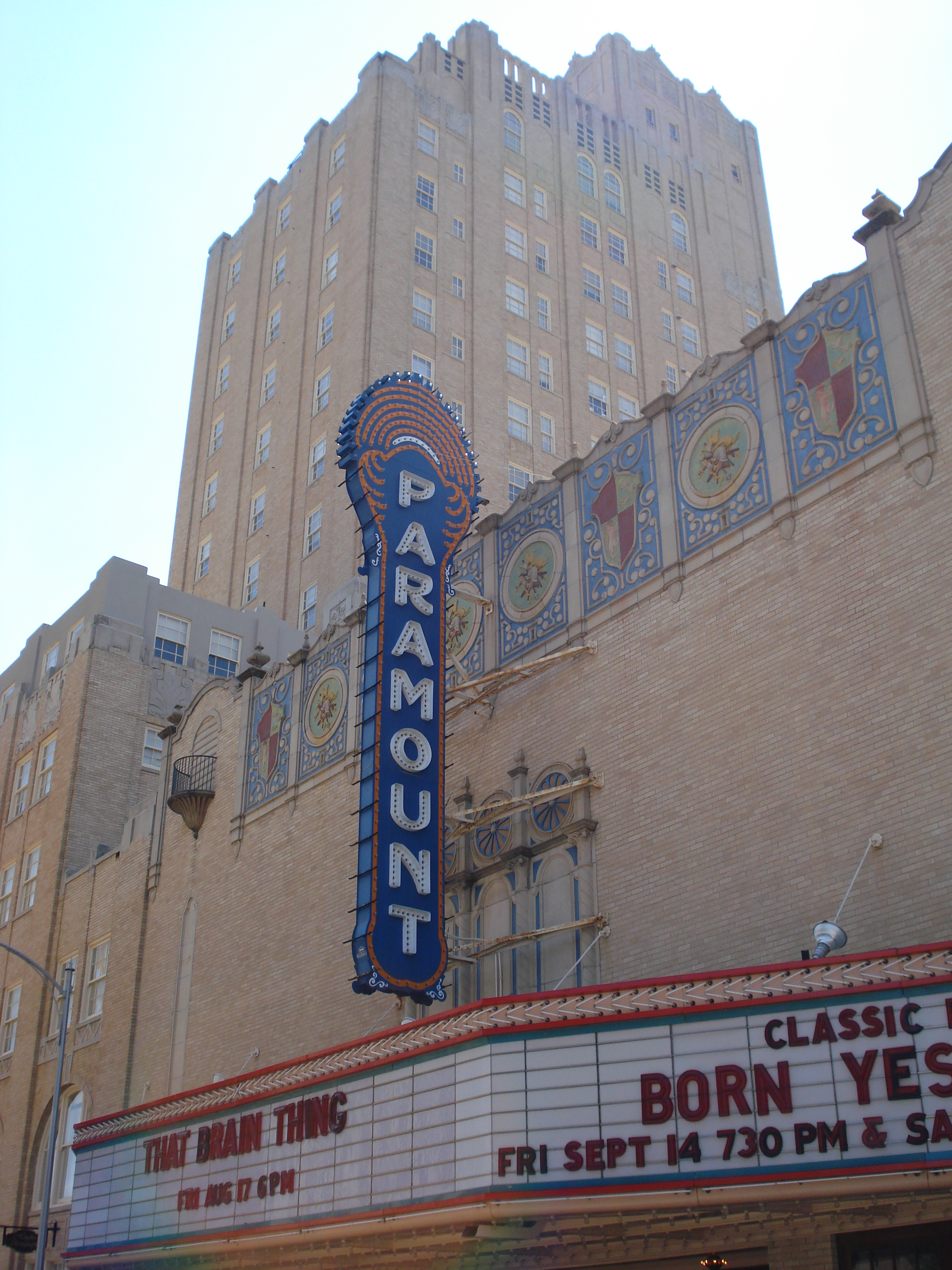
Paramount Theatre

David S. Castle (13 February 1884 – 28 October 1956) was an architect in Texas.

His firm has been assessed to be Abilene's "most successful architect", and a number of his works are listed on the U.S. National Register of Historic Places.

He was joined in business by his son, architect David S. Castle, Jr. after World War II and until Mr. Castle, Sr.'s death in 1956.

Works include:

- Abilene High School, 2800 N 6th St Abilene, TX
- Alexander-Campbell House, (1901), Prairie Style, 1546 N. 5th St. Abilene, TX
- David S. Castle House, 1742 N. Second St. Abilene, TX
- George R. Davis House, 718 Victoria Abilene, TX
- General Electric New American Home, (1936), 2142 Idlewild Abilene, TX
- Hotel Wooten, (1930), 1102 North 3rd Street, Abilene, TX
- Federal Building, 341 Pine Abilene, TX
- Albert S. and Ruth Goodloe House, 1302 Sayles Blvd. Abilene, TX
- Hilton Hotel, 986 N. Fourth St. Abilene, TX
- McMurry College Administration Building, Off Hunt, McMurry College Abilene, TX
- Paramount Theater, 352 Cypress St. Abilene, TX
- Settles Hotel, 200 E. Third St. Big Spring, TX
- Stephens County Courthouse, 200 W. Walker St. Breckenridge, TX
- William and Evla Stith House, 346 Mulberry St. Abilene, TX
- Winkler County Court House, 100 E Winkler St, Kermit TX
