= David Castle (cricketer) =

Australian cricketer (born 1972)

Personal information
- Full name: David James Castle
- Born: 25 May 1972 (age 54); Launceston, Tasmania, Australia
- Batting: Right-handed
- Bowling: Right-arm off-spin
- Role: Batsman

Domestic team information
- Years: Team
- 1992/93: Tasmanian Tigers

Career statistics
Competition	First-class
Matches	1
Runs scored	–
Batting average	–
100s/50s	–
Top score	–
Balls bowled	222
Wickets	3
Bowling average	37.00
5 wickets in innings	0
10 wickets in match	0
Best bowling	3/105
Catches/stumpings	1/–
- Source: CricInfo, 1 September 2009

David James Castle (born 25 May 1972) is a former cricket player who represented the Tasmanian Tigers in one first-class match. He played as a right-arm off spin bowler. After solid performances as a junior player, Castle joined the Commonwealth Bank Cricket Academy in 1990 and 1991. Following his time at the academy, Castle returned to the Tasmanian Grade Cricket competition, where he impressed state selectors enough to earn a call up as a replacement spin bowler for a first-class practice match. He didn't bat in the match, and took match bowling figures of 3/105 at 37.00. Although he had not bowled badly, he was not selected to play for his state again.
