= Big Spring State Park (Texas) =

State park in Texas, United States

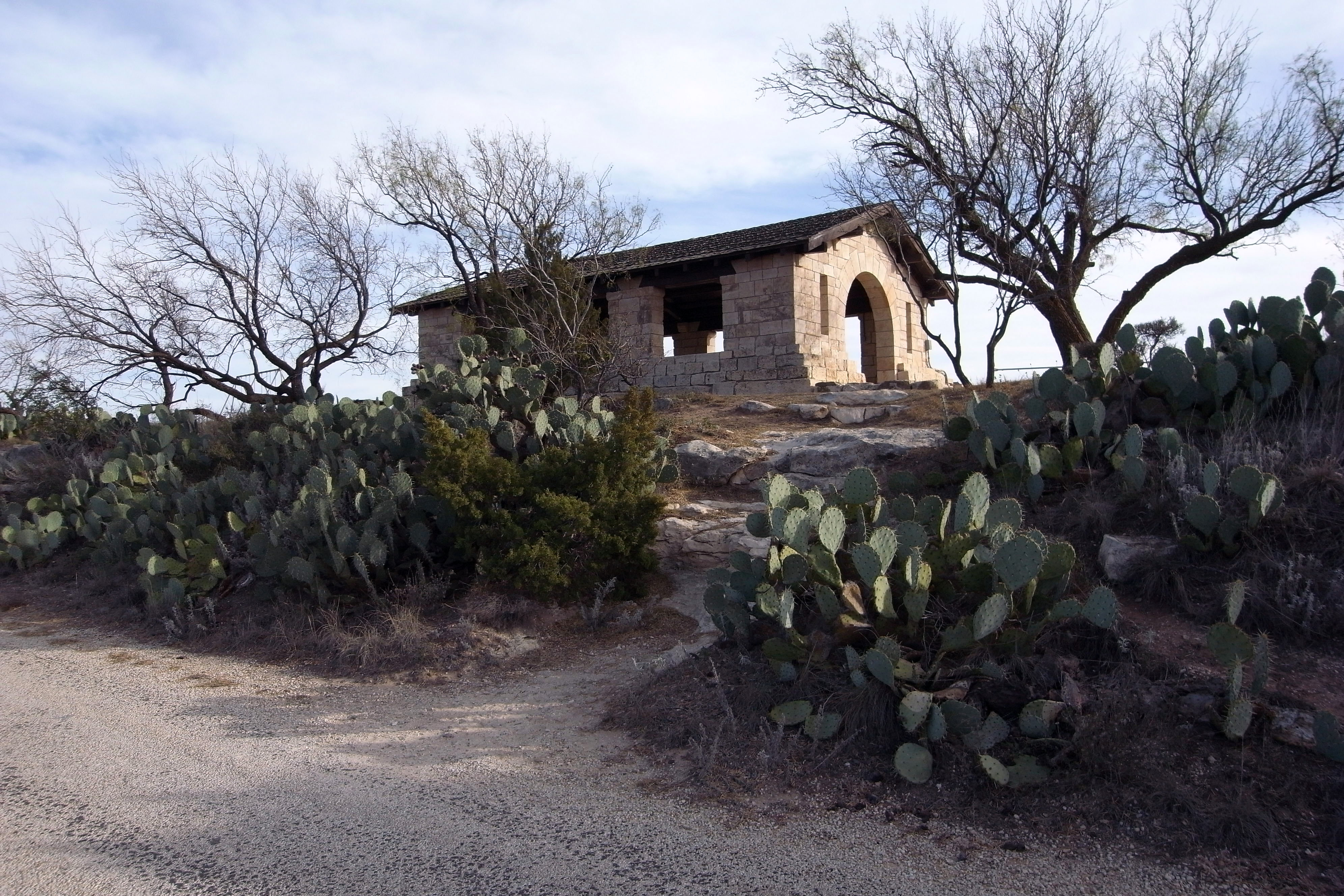
- Pavilion built by the Civilian Conservation Corps

- Location within Texas Location within the United States
- Location: Howard County, Texas, USA
- Nearest city: Big Spring
- Coordinates: 32°13′56″N 101°29′26″W
- Area: 381.99 acres (154.59 ha)
- Established: 1936
- Visitors: 106,741 (in 2025)
- Governing body: Texas Parks and Wildlife Department
- Website: Official site

Big Spring State Park is a state park in Big Spring, Howard County, Texas, United States and managed by the Texas Parks and Wildlife Department. It was opened in 1936 after the 381.99 acres (154.59 ha) upon which it is situated was deeded to the state by the city of Big Spring in 1934 and 1935. It is named for the natural spring once located on the site that was later replaced by an artificial one.

== History ==
The first written record of the spring was made on October 3, 1849, in the journal of Captain R.B. Marcy of the U.S. Cavalry while on his return trip to Fort Smith, Arkansas, from Santa Fe, New Mexico. The Spanish are thought to have visited the area as early as 1768, while Comanches and other Native American groups likely frequented the region much earlier, probably attracted by the permanent water source. Carvings dated c. 1917 indicate that other visitors to the park area included cattle drivers and those travelling to new territories.

Shortly after the state of Texas acquired the land in 1934, the Civilian Conservation Corps began construction on the park. Limestone quarried on-site was used in the building of the headquarters, pavilion, lodging, pump house and restroom. The limestone was also used in the building of retaining walls for a three-mile (5 km) drive that loops around Scenic Mountain. The walls were built using mortarless masonry techniques with large blocks of limestone, some weighing as much as two tons.

== Nature ==
=== Animals ===
Wildlife species in the park include gray fox, black-tailed prairie dog, ringtail, desert cottontail black-tailed jackrabbit and greater roadrunner.

=== Plants ===
Trees in the park include honey mesquite, Havard oak and redberry juniper. Other plants include species of cacti with prickly pear being most abundant.

== Facilities ==
Facilities at the park include a lighted group pavilion, which can accommodate up to 50 people; restrooms with no showers and a Texas State Park store. Native American artifacts and fossils from the area are on display at a seasonal interpretive center, which is also located in the park.

== Activities ==
Some of the recreational opportunities offered on the site include hiking, mountain biking, nature study, jogging and star gazing. The Big Spring Film Society began screening movies on top of the mountain in 2008, and continues to do so every summer. Close Encounters of the Third Kind, E.T. the Extra-Terrestrial, Star Trek: The Motion Picture, and The Dark Crystal are just a few of the films they have screened over the years.

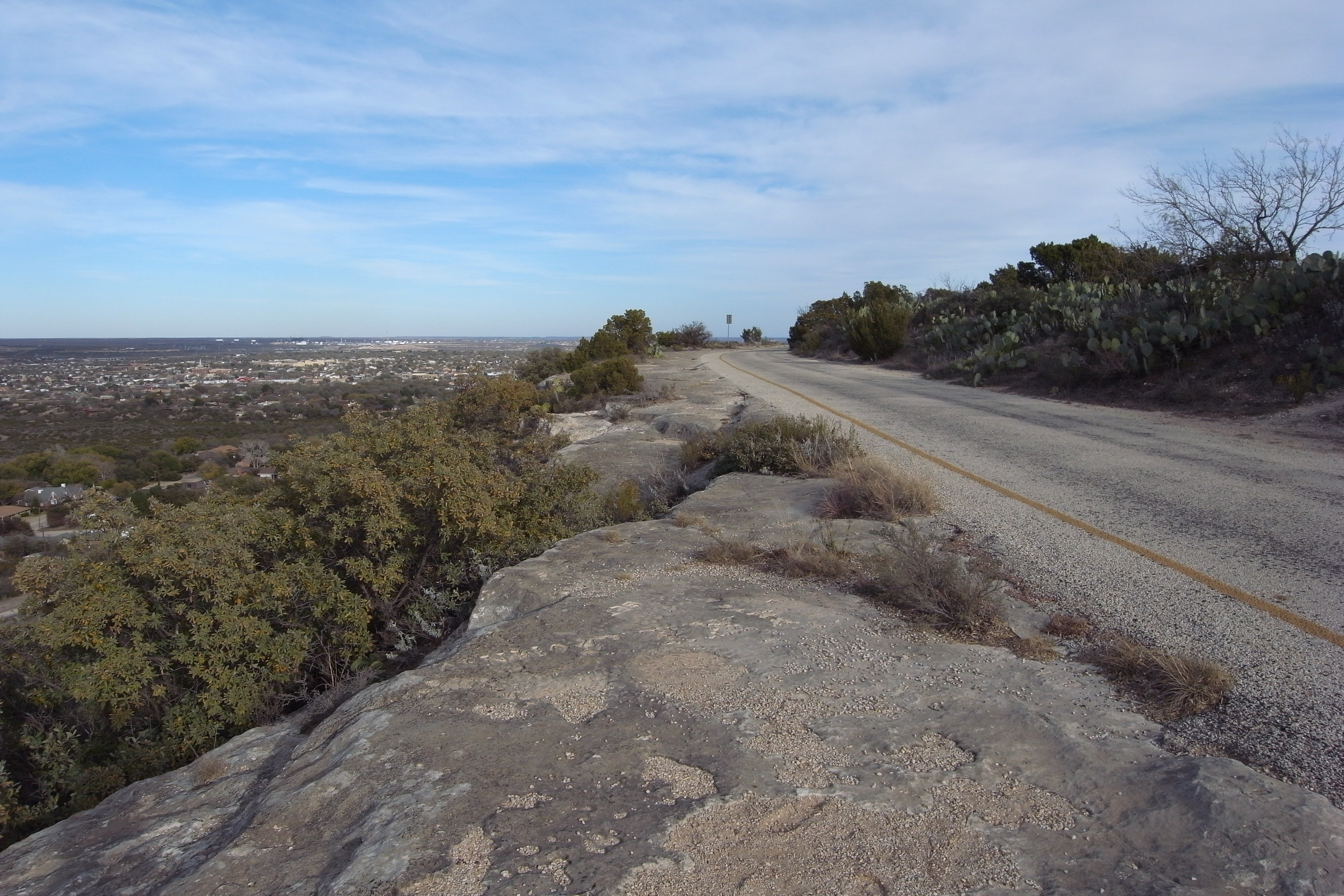
Scenic Drive

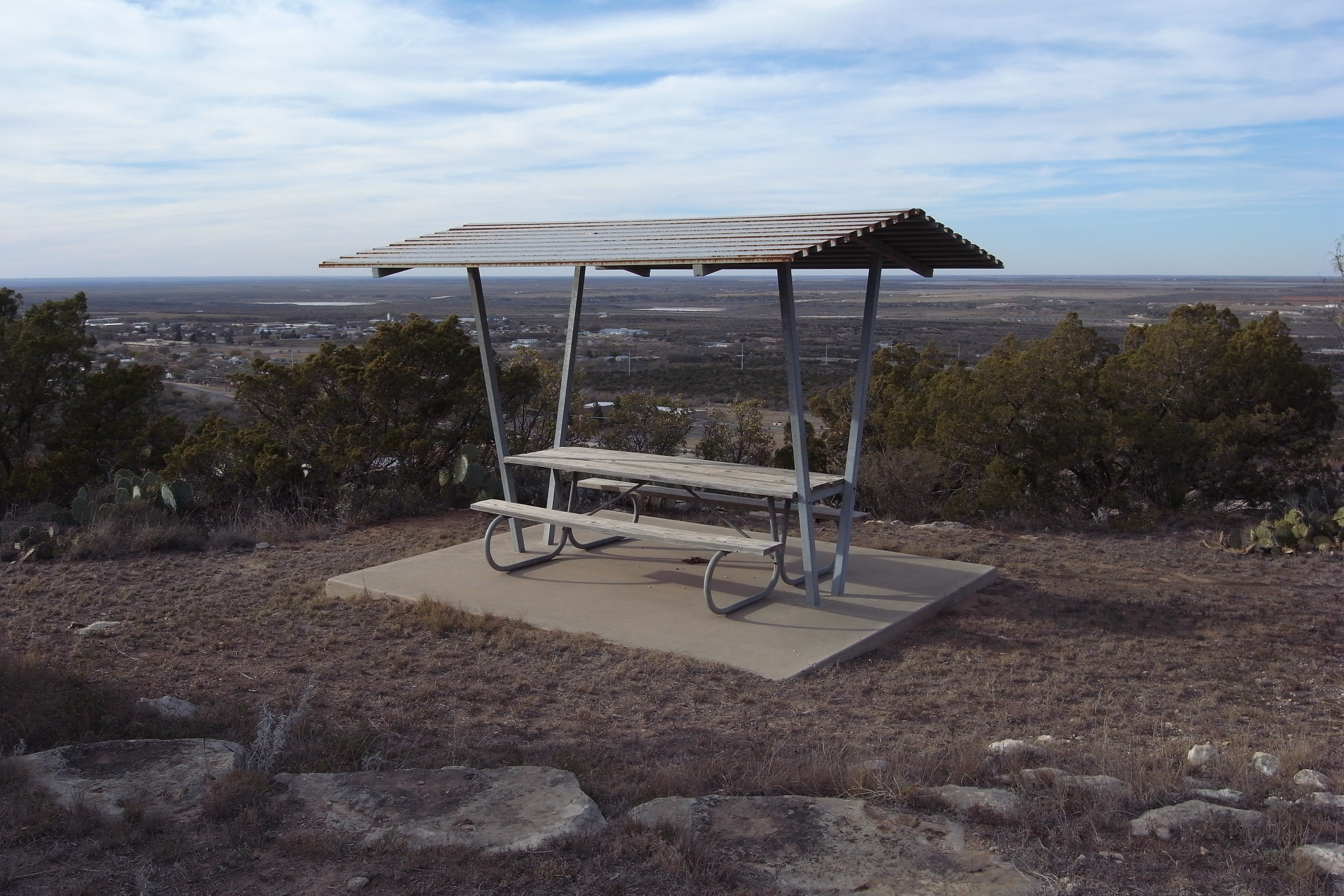
Shaded picnic table with a view

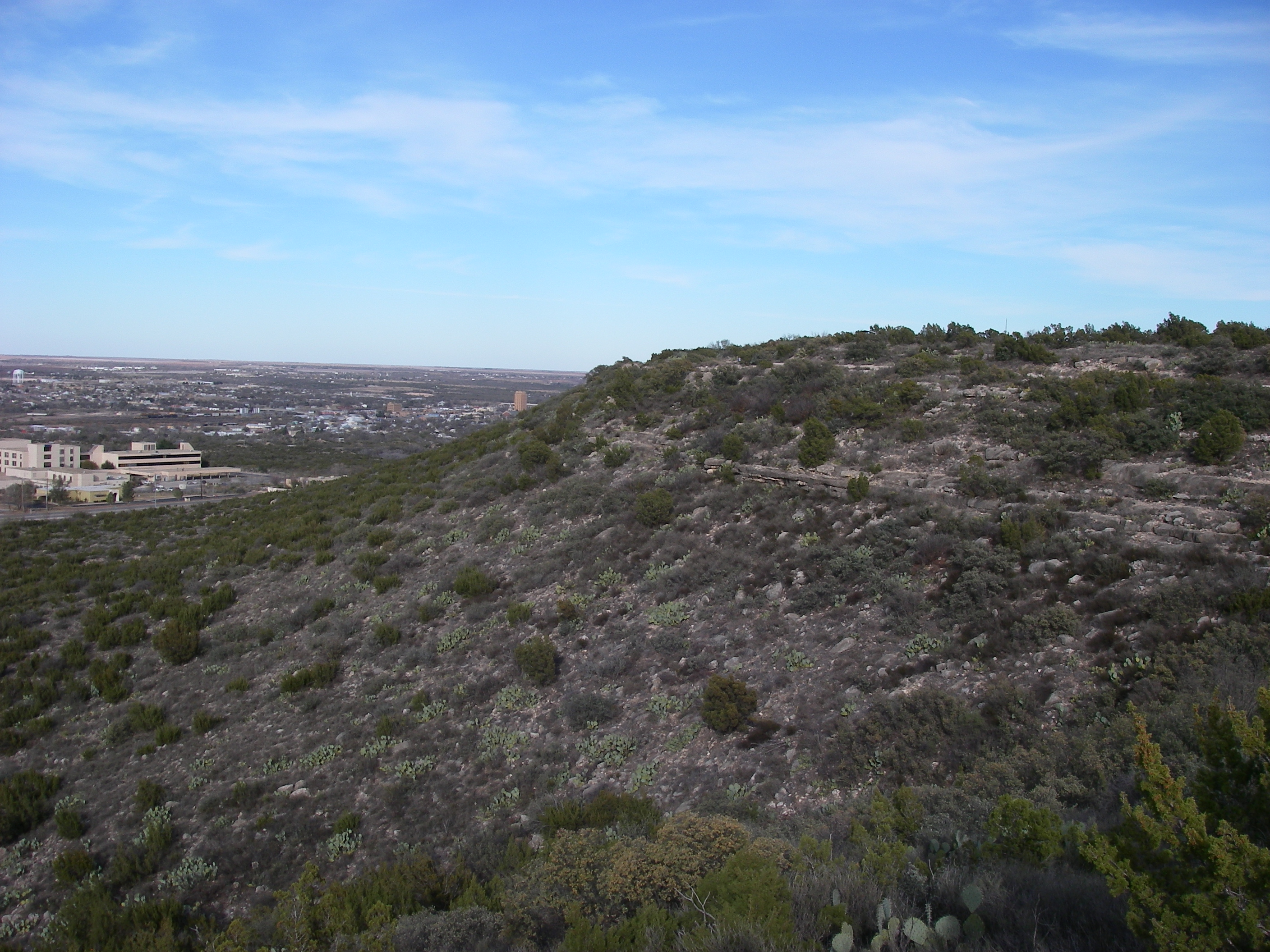
View from the summit of Scenic Mountain

== See also ==
- List of Texas state parks
- Mushaway Peak
- Duffy's Peak
- Edwards Plateau
