= Big Spring, Texas =

City in Howard County, Texas

- City
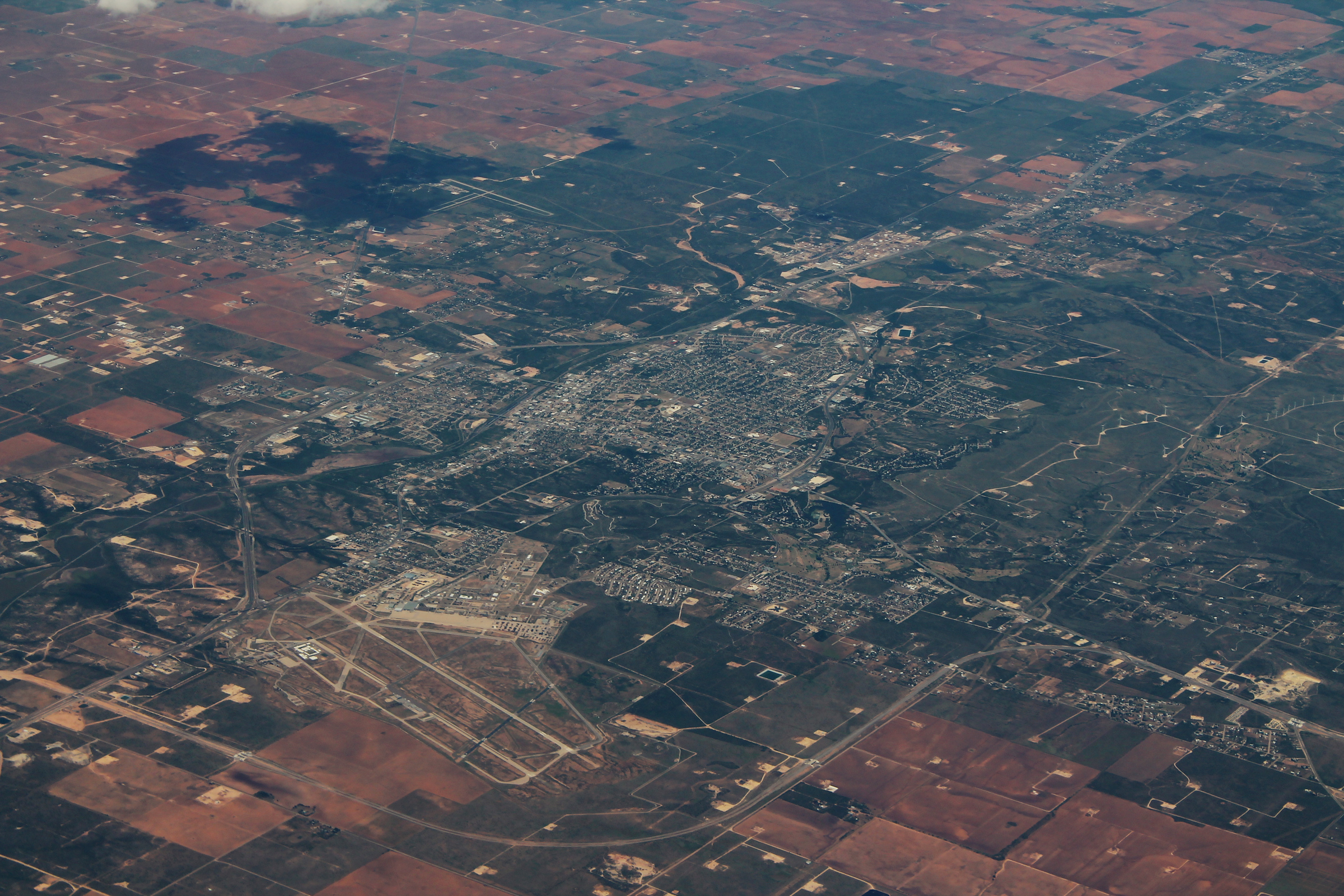
- Aerial view of Big Spring
- Nickname: "The Spring City"
- Interactive map of Big Spring, Texas
- Coordinates: 32°14′36″N 101°28′31″W
- Country: United States
- State: Texas
- County: Howard
- Founded: 1882
- Incorporated: 1907

Government
  - Type: Council-Manager
  - Mayor: Robert Moore
  - City manager: Todd Darden
  - Assistant City Manager: Lesa Gamble
  - Councilmember: District 1 – Nick Ornelas; District 2 – Diane Yanez; District 3 – Cody Hughes; District 4 – Homer Wilkerson; District 5 – Troy Tompkins; District 6 – Daniel Moreno

Area
  - Total: 19.226 sq mi (49.795 km^{2})
  - Land: 19.138 sq mi (49.566 km^{2})
  - Water: 0.088 sq mi (0.229 km^{2})
- Elevation: 2,441 ft (744 m)

Population (2020)
  - Total: 26,144
  - Estimate (2023): 22,373
  - Rank: TX: 140th
  - Density: 1,169/sq mi (451.4/km^{2})
- Time zone: UTC–6 (Central (CST))
  - Summer (DST): UTC–5 (CDT)
- ZIP Codes: 79720, 79721
- Area code: 432
- FIPS code: 48-08236
- GNIS feature ID: 1330654
- Sales tax: 8.25%
- Website: www.bigspringtx.gov

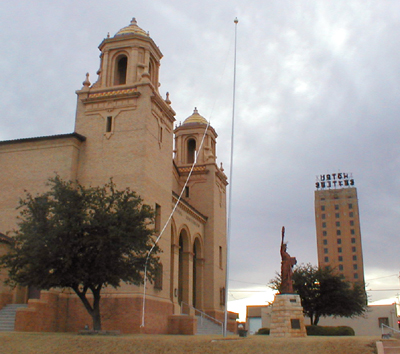
The Municipal Auditorium in Big Spring

Big Spring is a city in and the county seat of Howard County, Texas, United States, at the crossroads of U.S. Highway 87 and Interstate 20. Its population was 26,144 at the 2020 census. Big Spring was established as the county seat of Howard County in 1882; it is the largest community in the county.

The city took its name from the single, large spring that issued into a small gorge between the base of Scenic Mountain and a neighboring hill in the southwestern part of the city limits. Although the name is sometimes still mistakenly pluralized, it is officially singular. "To the native or established residents who may wince at the plural in Big Spring, it should be explained that until about 1916, when for some unexplained reason the name dropped the final 's', the official name of the town was indeed Big Springs."

== History ==
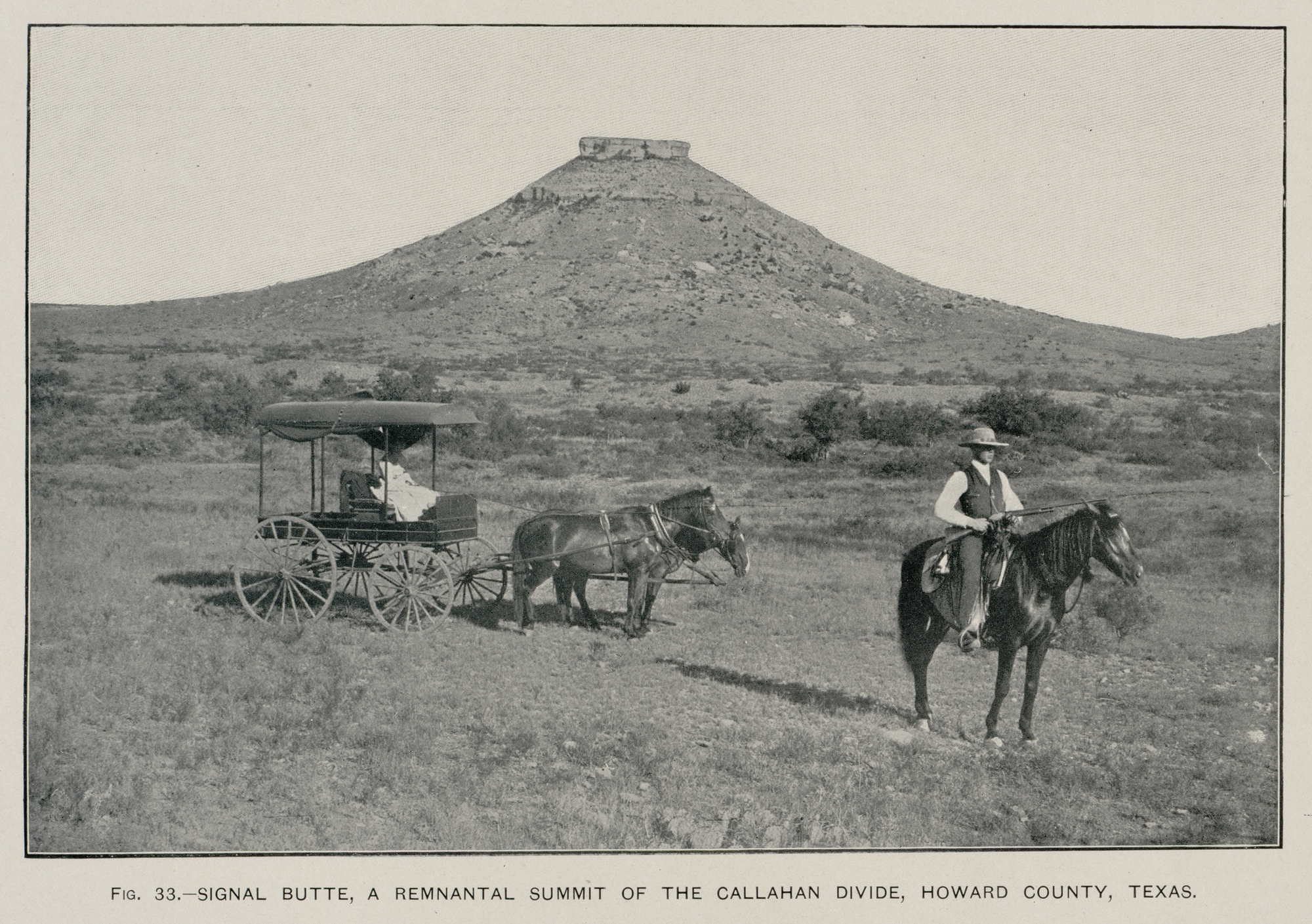
Signal Peak located 10 mi (16 km) to the southeast of Big Spring (Robert T. Hill, 1889)

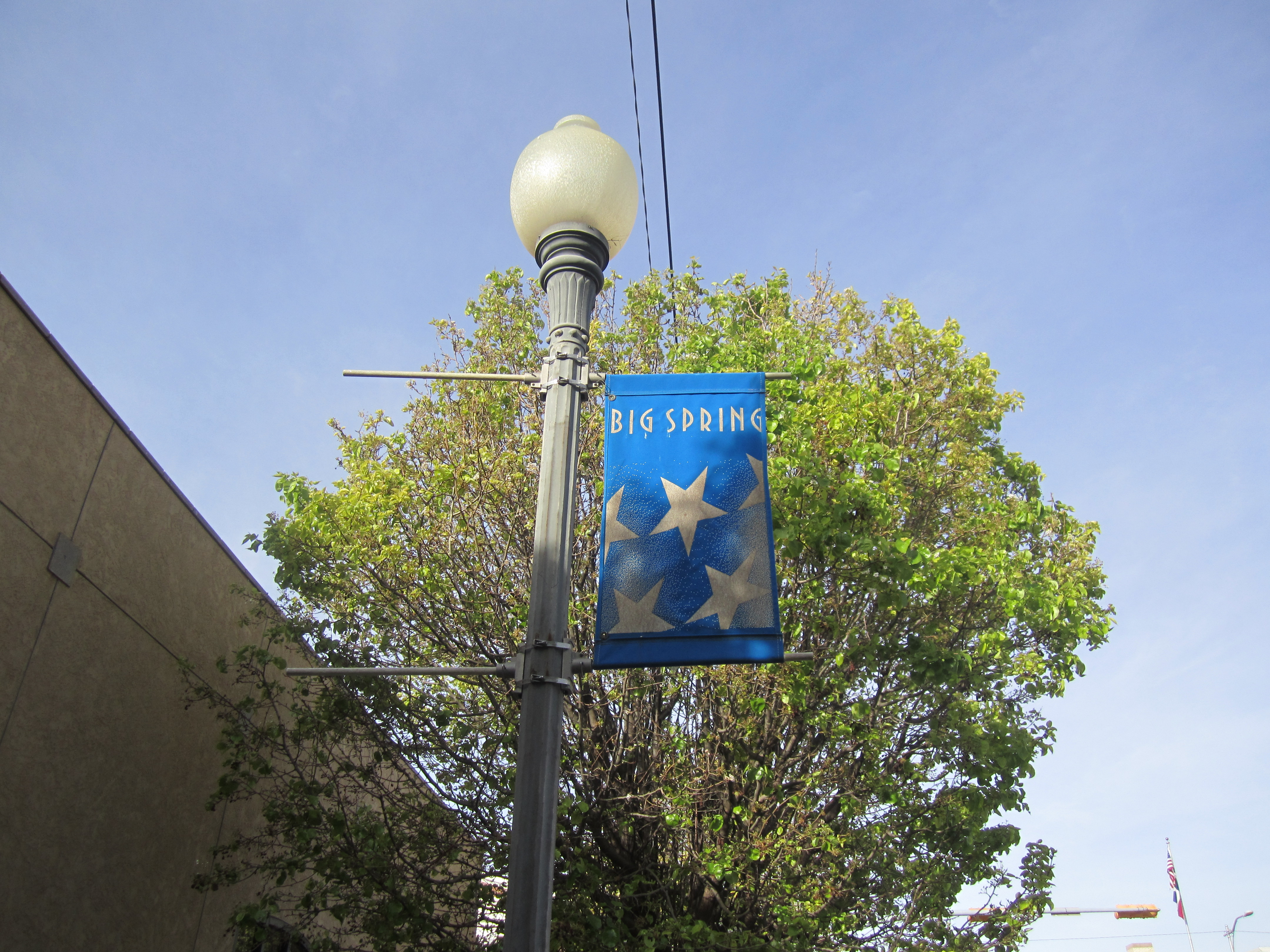
Big Spring decorative sign

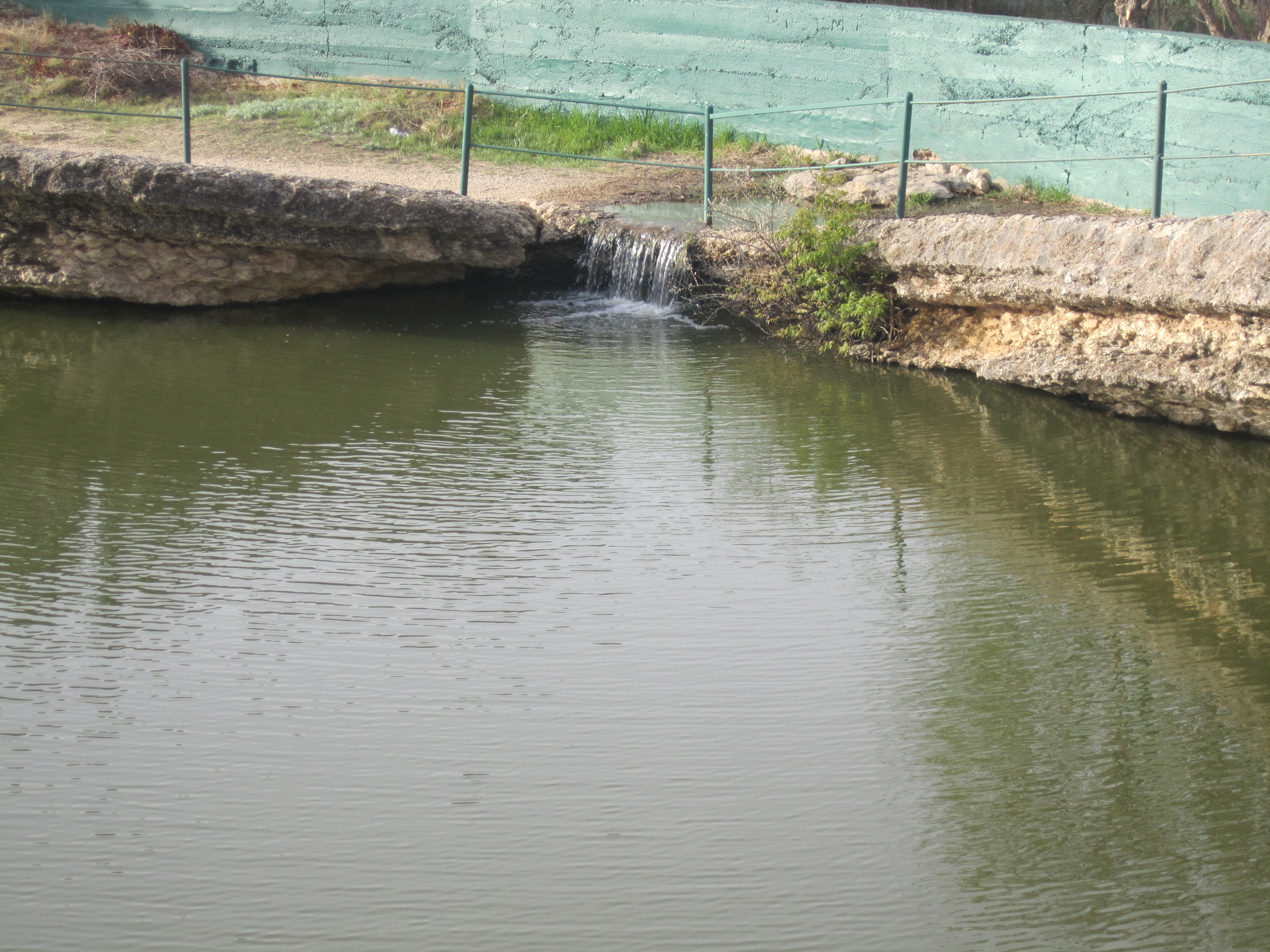
The "big spring" in Comanche Trail Park

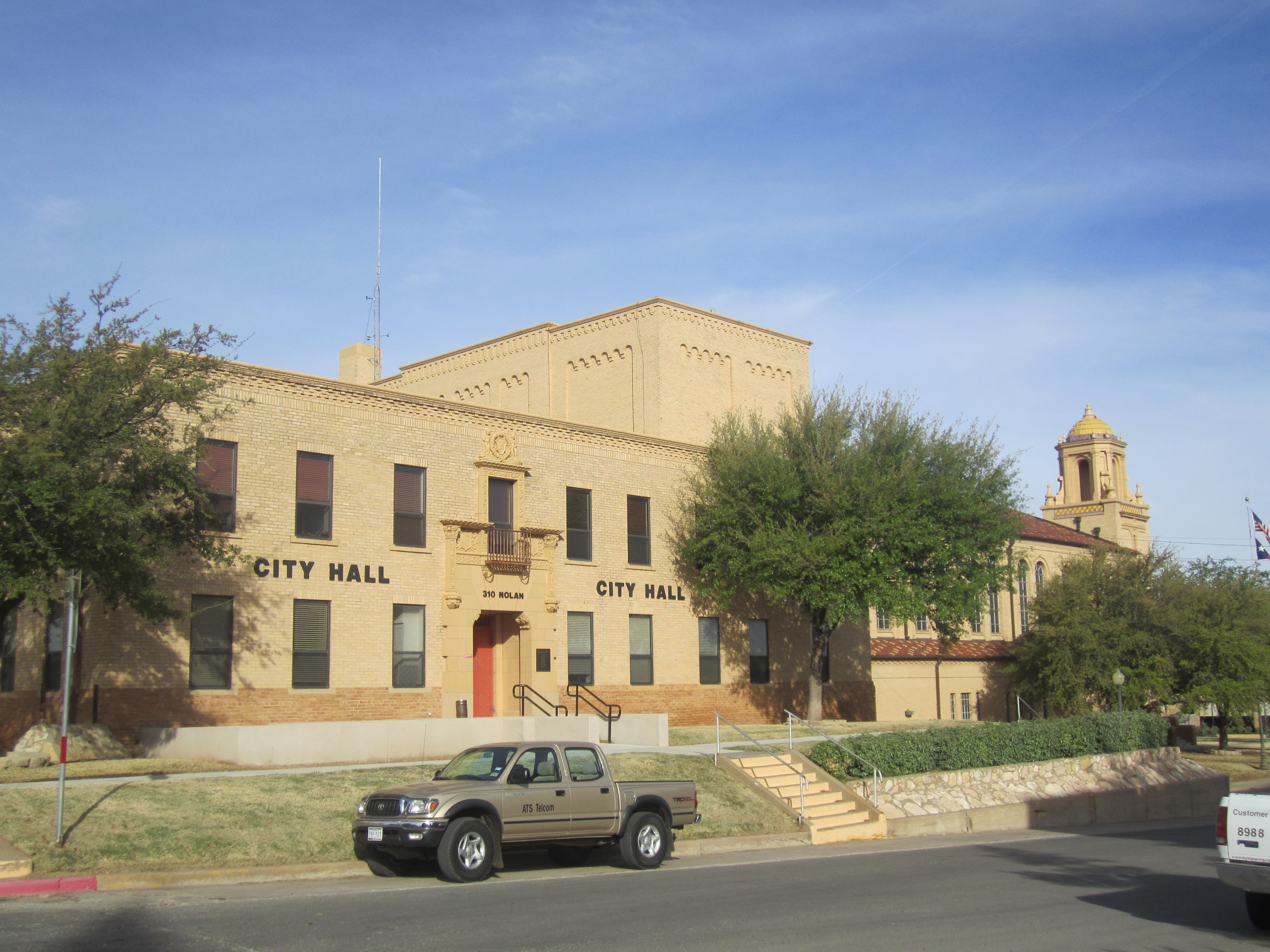
Big Spring City Hall

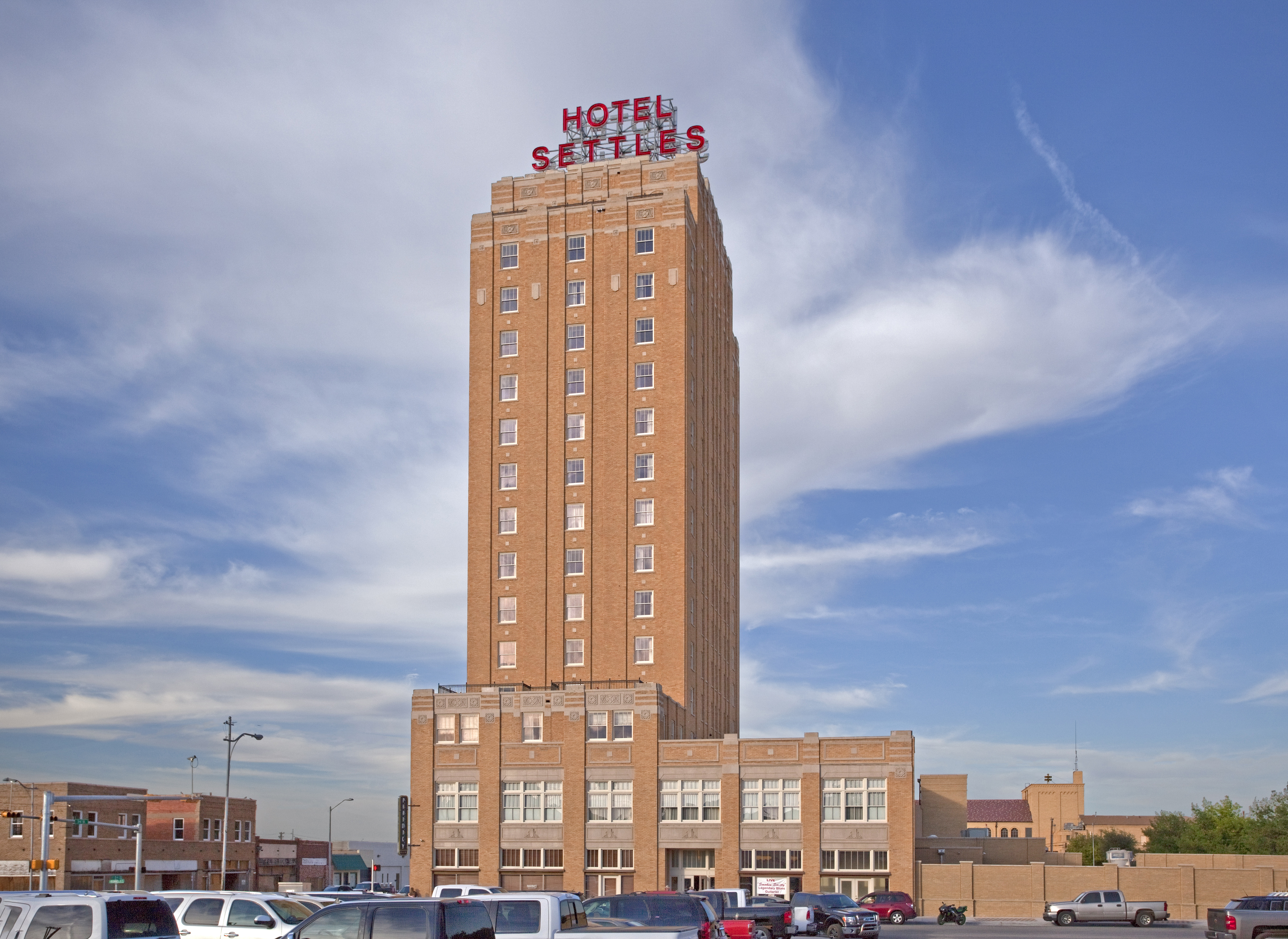
Newly refurbished Settles Hotel

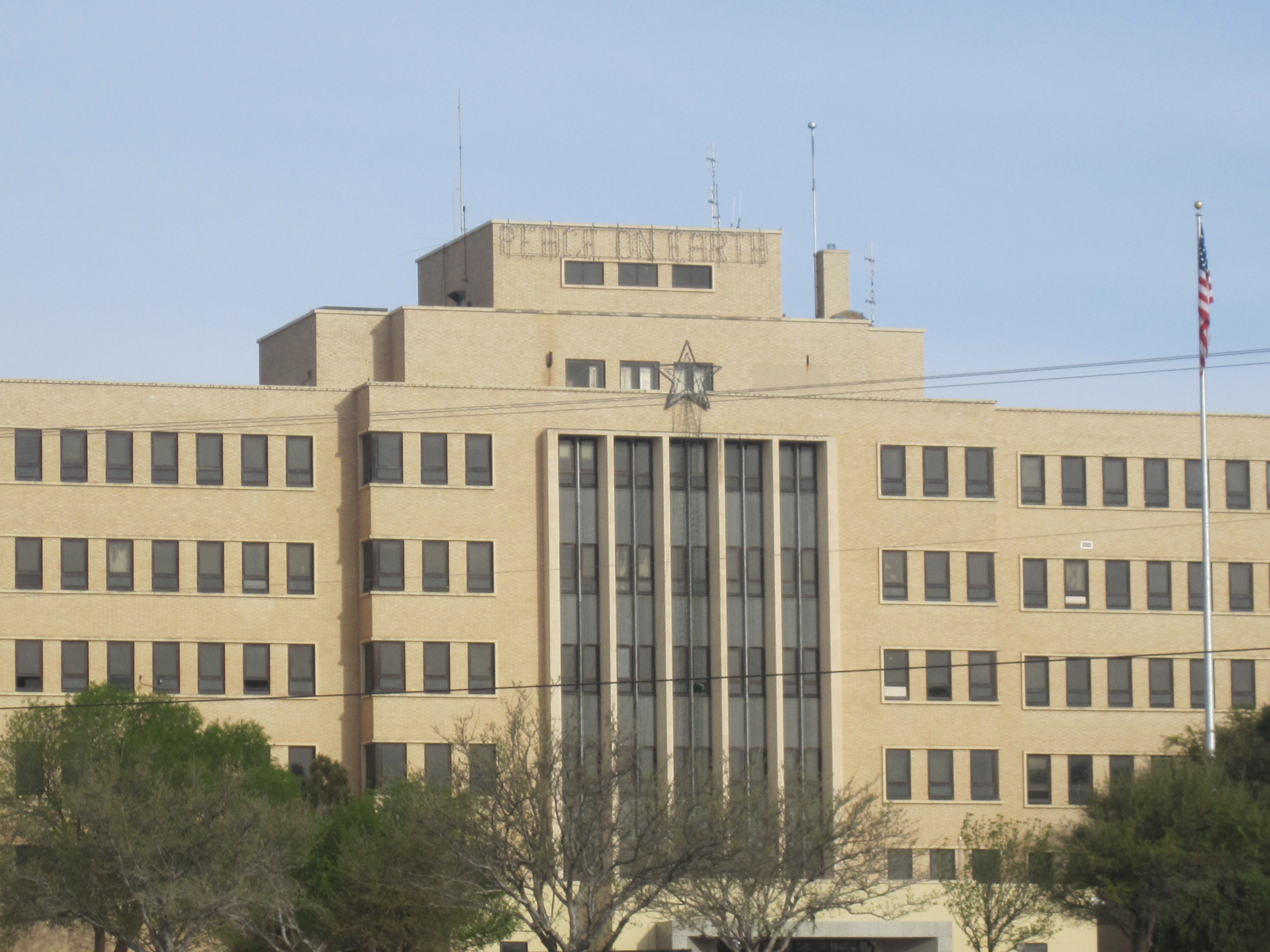
Big Spring Veterans Hospital

The area had long been a popular watering hole for Native American residents and nomads, including members of the more recently established Jumano, Apache, and Comanche tribes. The first European to view the site was probably a member of a Spanish expedition exploring the Great Plains from New Mexico. During the 1840s and 1850s, Big Spring was often where Comanches assembled and organized themselves before departing on large-scale raids into northern Mexico during the Comanche-Mexico Wars.

Captain Randolph B. Marcy's expedition in 1849 was the first United States expedition to explore and map the area. Marcy marked the spring as a campsite on the Overland Trail to California. The site began to collect inhabitants, and by the late 1870s, a settlement had sprung up to support buffalo hunters who frequented the area. The original settlement consisted largely of hide huts and saloons. Ranching quickly became a major industry in the area; early ranchers included F.G. Oxsheer, C.C. Slaughter, and B.F. Wolcott.

One notable early rancher was Briton Joseph Heneage Finch, the seventh Earl of Aylesford. Finch purchased 37,000 acres (150 km^{2}) of ranchland in the area in 1883, and is credited with building Big Spring's first permanent structure, a butcher shop.

The completion of the Texas and Pacific Railroad led to the founding in the early 1880s of Abilene, Colorado City, and Big Spring, three railroading and ranching cities where saloons and gambling dens flourished.

More important in the city's history was the discovery of oil in the region during the 1920s. The early discoveries in the area marked the beginning of the oil industry in the Permian Basin area of West Texas, and the oil industry has continued to be a dominant part of the area's economy. The oil industry in Big Spring reached its peak during the oil boom of the 1950s.

Another major part of Big Spring's economy and life during the 1950s, 1960s, and 1970s was Webb Air Force Base. It initially opened during World War II as the Big Spring Bombardier School. Following the war, it was converted to a US Air Force training base and was named for James Webb, a Big Spring native who died in action during World War II. Webb Air Force Base was active until 1977, when the base facilities were deeded to the city.

Big Spring was featured in the 1969 film Midnight Cowboy, which starred Dustin Hoffman and Jon Voight, and received the Academy Award for Best Picture of 1969. The opening scenes featuring Voight, then a relatively unknown actor, playing the character Joe Buck, were filmed in Big Spring and the neighboring city of Stanton.

In 1980, Hollywood returned to Big Spring with the filming of Hangar 18, a low-budget science-fiction movie about a space shuttle's collision with an alien spacecraft and the ensuing government cover-up. Several local residents were used as on-screen extras.

In 1999, a New York energy company erected the first 80 m (260 ft) tower for one of North America's largest wind turbines for that time at Big Spring.

The FAI The World Hang Gliding Championship was hosted by Big Spring in August 2007.

=== Origin of the name "Big Spring" ===
The area's "big spring", long dry but recently modified to draw water from Comanche Trail Lake, was of major importance to all life in the surrounding area. In the early 1840s, it was the center of a territorial dispute between Comanche and Pawnee tribes, and has been a major watering hole for wildlife and prehistoric people in this semiarid area. Early military scouting reports and pioneer accounts describe the water as cold, clear, and dependable; the spring pool was about 15 ft (5 m) deep, with the overflow going only a short distance down the draw before it sank beneath the surface. The spring has mistakenly been described in other writings as being located in Sulphur Draw. It is actually located to the south, near the top of a small, rugged, unnamed draw running eastwards from the spring, and is itself a tributary to Beal's Creek, the name given to Sulphur Draw as it flows into, through, and past the city of Big Spring.

Long used by regional inhabitants, both permanent and nomadic, with a large number of locally collected artifacts testifying to its heavy occupation, the spring sat astride the several branches of the later-developed Comanche War Trail as they converged on this important water hole from beyond Texas, coming south across the Northern Plains and the Llano Estacado. From the Big Spring, the war trail continued south via three branches, one to the southeast through the western part of the Concho country; one going almost due south, heading for Castle Gap and Horsehead Crossing on the Pecos River; and one heading west to Willow Springs in the sand country southwest of present Midland, before turning south down the Pecos, all headed ultimately for Mexico. As whites began to settle the western territories, the spring continued to serve as a major watering place on the southern route of the Gold Rush Trail of the early 1850s and continued in use well beyond that time, as the cross-continental trail turned into a major road for later pioneers coming into the area.

The spring was sourced from a relatively small aquifer situated on the northern end of the Edwards Plateau and the southern end of the High Plains, being, structurally, a collecting sink of lower Cretaceous (Fredericksburg) limestones and sands. The spring aquifer held a large quantity of water due to the great number of fractures, solution channels, and interstices in the rocks and underlying sands, although the areal extent of the Big Spring sink is estimated to be only 1 mi (2 km) in diameter, with the main area only 3,000 ft (914 m) wide and almost circular, with some ellipticity trending towards the west. The Cretaceous beds subsided about 280 ft (85 m) below their normal position, centered on the southeast quarter of Section 12, Block 33 T1S; T&P RR Co survey, and the entire stratum appears to be preserved within the sink, the surface topography roughly following the subsurface subsidence. This writing identifies the sink as one of a number of similar subsurface geologic features in the surrounding area, differing from the Big Spring sink only in the fact that the surface topography above the others, while showing some decline, does not dip low enough to intersect the top of the water tables; hence, no springs could form from the other aquifers. In a passing comment, enigmatic in its content and disappointing in its brevity, the report states no other comparable deep sinks formed elsewhere on the Edwards Plateau.

The same publication suggests the spring's discharge volume was in excess of 100,000 U.S. gallons (378,541 L) per day at the time of the railroad's arrival in the area in the late 1880s. The water was heavily mined by wells built by both the railroad and the early town of Big Spring, greatly in excess of its modest recharge rate, until the water table first dropped below the level of the spring outlet, and finally, was completely depleted by the mid-1920s. The city now artificially fills the spring from its current source of water as a means of allowing residents and visitors to maintain some idea of how it appeared in times past.

== Geography ==
Big Spring is located slightly south of the center of Howard County in the valley of Beals Creek, an eastward-flowing tributary of the Colorado River. Interstate 20 runs through the northern side of the city, with access from exits 174 through 182. I-20 leads east 108 miles (174 km) to Abilene and west 40 miles (64 km) to Midland. U.S. Route 87 (Gregg Street) until recently ran through the center of Big Spring, leading north 106 miles (171 km) to Lubbock and southeast 86 miles (138 km) to San Angelo. A bypass to the west of the city now carries US 87, while the old route is now Business US 87.

According to the United States Census Bureau, the city has a total area of 19.226 square miles (49.80 km^{2}), of which 0.088 sq mi (0.23 km^{2}), or about 56 acres, is covered by water.

=== Climate ===
Climate data for Big Spring, Texas (1991–2020 normals, extremes 1948–2021)
Month	Jan	Feb	Mar	Apr	May	Jun	Jul	Aug	Sep	Oct	Nov	Dec	Year
Record high °F (°C)	85 (29)	91 (33)	97 (36)	105 (41)	109 (43)	114 (46)	110 (43)	112 (44)	108 (42)	101 (38)	92 (33)	86 (30)	114 (46)
Mean maximum °F (°C)	78.0 (25.6)	81.9 (27.7)	88.5 (31.4)	94.4 (34.7)	100.7 (38.2)	104.1 (40.1)	103.5 (39.7)	102.1 (38.9)	97.8 (36.6)	93.6 (34.2)	83.5 (28.6)	77.2 (25.1)	106.4 (41.3)
Mean daily maximum °F (°C)	58.0 (14.4)	62.5 (16.9)	71.0 (21.7)	79.4 (26.3)	87.0 (30.6)	93.8 (34.3)	95.8 (35.4)	94.7 (34.8)	87.9 (31.1)	79.1 (26.2)	67.1 (19.5)	58.2 (14.6)	77.9 (25.5)
Daily mean °F (°C)	44.7 (7.1)	48.6 (9.2)	56.7 (13.7)	64.7 (18.2)	73.3 (22.9)	81.0 (27.2)	83.9 (28.8)	83.1 (28.4)	75.7 (24.3)	66.1 (18.9)	53.9 (12.2)	45.5 (7.5)	64.8 (18.2)
Mean daily minimum °F (°C)	31.4 (−0.3)	34.7 (1.5)	42.4 (5.8)	50.1 (10.1)	59.5 (15.3)	68.2 (20.1)	72.1 (22.3)	71.5 (21.9)	63.6 (17.6)	53.1 (11.7)	40.7 (4.8)	32.8 (0.4)	51.7 (10.9)
Mean minimum °F (°C)	19.0 (−7.2)	21.5 (−5.8)	27.3 (−2.6)	36.2 (2.3)	46.4 (8.0)	59.0 (15.0)	64.9 (18.3)	64.0 (17.8)	51.7 (10.9)	36.8 (2.7)	26.1 (−3.3)	20.1 (−6.6)	15.0 (−9.4)
Record low °F (°C)	−2 (−19)	−5 (−21)	9 (−13)	25 (−4)	31 (−1)	43 (6)	51 (11)	50 (10)	39 (4)	19 (−7)	15 (−9)	1 (−17)	−5 (−21)
Average precipitation inches (mm)	0.73 (19)	0.80 (20)	1.15 (29)	1.55 (39)	2.54 (65)	2.49 (63)	1.58 (40)	2.40 (61)	2.39 (61)	1.84 (47)	1.35 (34)	0.78 (20)	19.60 (498)
Average snowfall inches (cm)	0.3 (0.76)	0.7 (1.8)	0.0 (0.0)	0.0 (0.0)	0.0 (0.0)	0.0 (0.0)	0.0 (0.0)	0.0 (0.0)	0.0 (0.0)	0.0 (0.0)	0.3 (0.76)	0.7 (1.8)	2.0 (5.1)
Average precipitation days (≥ 0.01 in)	2.8	3.3	3.5	2.8	4.1	5.3	4.0	5.2	5.0	4.1	2.6	2.8	45.5
Average snowy days (≥ 0.1 in)	0.2	0.2	0.0	0.0	0.0	0.0	0.0	0.0	0.0	0.0	0.1	0.3	0.8
Source: NOAA

== Demographics ==
Historical population
Census	Pop.	Note	%±
1890	1,158		—
1910	4,102		—
1920	4,273		4.2%
1930	13,735		221.4%
1940	12,604		−8.2%
1950	17,286		37.1%
1960	31,230		80.7%
1970	28,735		−8.0%
1980	24,804		−13.7%
1990	23,093		−6.9%
2000	25,233		9.3%
2010	27,282		8.1%
2020	26,144		−4.2%
2023 (est.)	22,373		−14.4%
U.S. Decennial Census; Texas Almanac: 1850–2000; 2020 Census

=== Racial and ethnic composition ===
Big Spring city, Texas – Demographic Profile (NH = Non-Hispanic)
Race / ethnicity	Pop 2010	Pop 2020	% 2010	% 2020
White (NH)	12,742	9,753	%	37.30%
Black or African American (NH)	2,030	1,416	%	5.42%
Native American or Alaska Native (NH)	173	159	%	0.61%
Asian (NH)	237	328	%	1.25%
Pacific Islander (NH)	9	9	0.03%	0.03%
Some other race (NH)	76	49	%	0.19%
Multiracial (NH)	264	569	%	2.18%
Hispanic or Latino	11,751	13,861	43.1%	53.02%
Total	27,282	26,144	100.0%	100.00%

=== 2020 census ===
As of the 2020 census, 26,144 people, 8,320 households, and 5,333 families were residing in the city. The population density was 1,382.3 inhabitants per square mile (533.7/km^{2}).

The median age was 37.2 years. 22.1% of residents were under the age of 18 and 13.3% of residents were 65 years of age or older. For every 100 females there were 139.9 males, and for every 100 females age 18 and over there were 152.2 males age 18 and over.

98.8% of residents lived in urban areas, while 1.2% lived in rural areas.

Of the 8,320 households, 34.2% had children under the age of 18 living in them. Of all households, 40.2% were married-couple households, 22.1% were households with a male householder and no spouse or partner present, and 30.0% were households with a female householder and no spouse or partner present. About 30.4% of all households were made up of individuals and 12.4% had someone living alone who was 65 years of age or older.

There were 9,965 housing units, of which 16.5% were vacant. Among occupied housing units, 59.0% were owner-occupied and 41.0% were renter-occupied. The homeowner vacancy rate was 2.7% and the rental vacancy rate was 18.4%.

Racial composition as of the 2020 census
Race	Percent
White	64.6%
Black or African American	6.1%
American Indian and Alaska Native	1.2%
Asian	1.3%
Native Hawaiian and Other Pacific Islander	0.1%
Some other race	11.9%
Two or more races	14.9%
Hispanic or Latino (of any race)	53.0%

=== 2010 census ===
As of the 2010 census, 27,282 people, 8,267 households, and families resided in the city. The population density was 1,428.4 inhabitants per square mile (551.5/km^{2}), with 9,640 housing units. The racial makeup of the city was 69.7% White, 7.8% African American, 0.9% Native American, 0.9% Asian, 18.4% from some other races, and 2.3% from two or more races. Hispanics or Latinos of any race were 43.1% of the population.

== Arts and culture ==
Big Spring is the site of several major hang-gliding championship tournaments, including the U.S. Hang Gliding Nationals. The city was also the site for the filming of parts of Midnight Cowboy and Hangar 18.

=== Points of interest ===
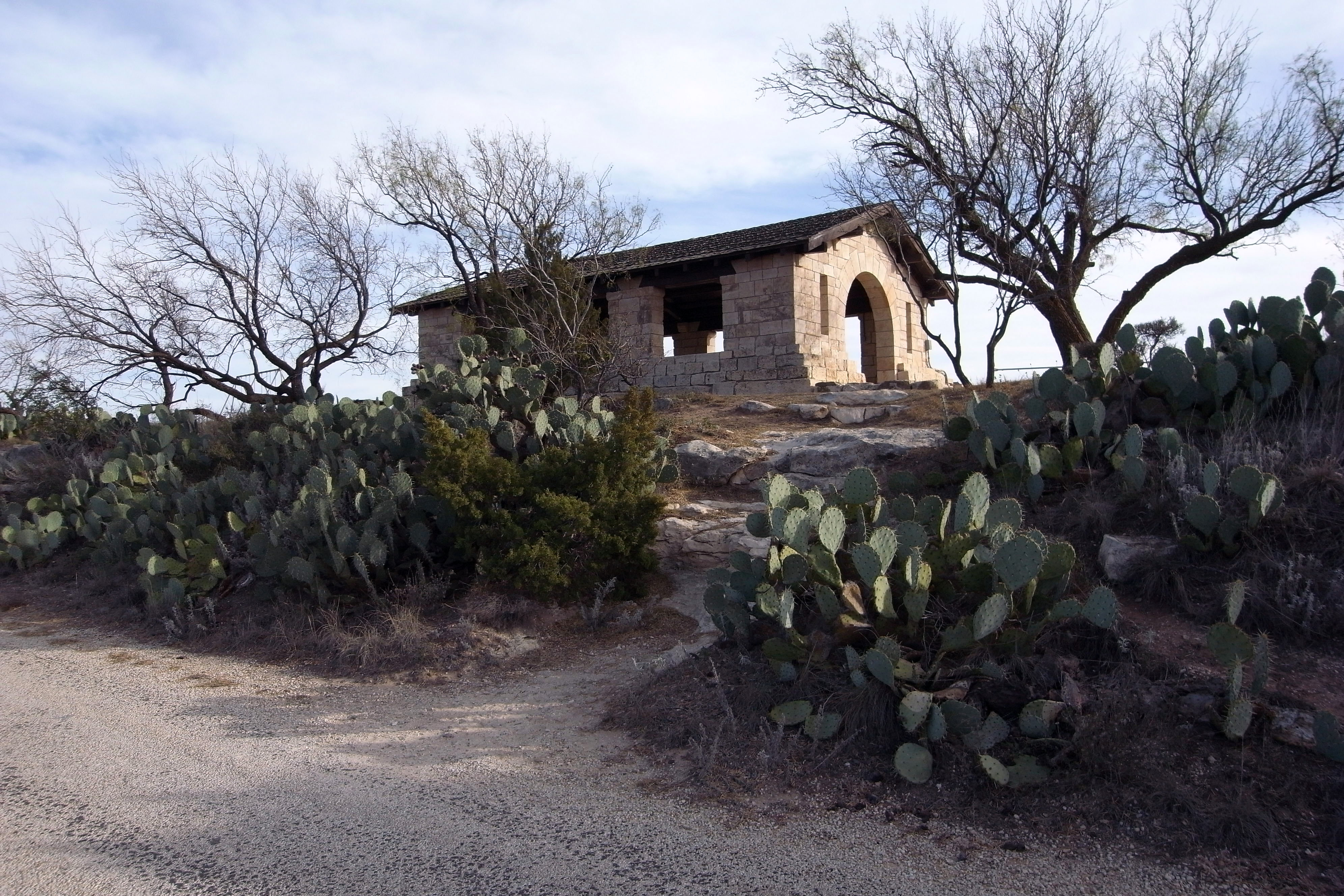
The picnic pavilion at Big Spring State Park was built by the Civilian Conservation Corps in the 1930s.

- Settles Hotel
- Big Spring Municipal Auditorium (a 1,400-seat, city-owned facility, which is home to the Big Spring Symphony and center for local and traveling performances)
- Howard County Courthouse
- Heritage Museum of Big Spring (a 13,000-square-foot museum featuring exhibits of local history and interest)
- Potton–Hayden House
- Hangar 25 Air Museum (a museum, housed in a fully restored World War II-era hangar, which promotes education through the collection, preservation, and exhibition of the history of the Big Spring Army Air Force Bombardier School and Webb Air Force Base)
- Big Spring Vietnam Memorial
- Big Spring State Park
- Comanche Trail Park (a 400-acre city park that features the historic "big spring", a 6,900-seat limestone amphitheater, an 18-hole golf course, tennis courts, baseball fields, playgrounds, and pavilions, as well as hike, bike and nature trails)
- Moss Creek Lake (a 400-acre recreational area offering a beach swimming area, paintball course, dirt-bike course, and a playground, as well as an RV park with full hook-ups and 26 sheltered campsites)
- Signal Peak (also called Signal Mountain, a landmark 10 miles southeast of Big Spring near Moss Creek Lake, used by Native Americans and early Anglo settlers)
- George H. O'Brien, Jr. VA Medical Center (primary facility for the West Texas VA Health Care System, which serves veterans in 33 counties across 53,000 sq mi of West Texas and eastern New Mexico)
- Dorothy Garrett Coliseum
- Panther Creek Wind Farm
- Delek US Refinery (formerly Alon USA)
- McMahon-Wrinkle Industrial Airpark (formerly Webb Air Force Base)

== Government ==
Following the 2011 redistricting, Howard County is represented in the Texas House of Representatives by the District 72 Republican Drew Darby of San Angelo.

== Education ==
The majority of the municipality is in the Big Spring Independent School District. Some portions are in the Forsan Independent School District.

Tertiary:

- Howard College
  - All of Howard County is in the service area of Howard County Junior College District.
  - SouthWest College for the Deaf (formerly Southwest Collegiate Institute for the Deaf) is attached to Howard College.

== Media ==
- Big Spring Herald
- KBST/KBTS Radio
- KBYG-AM Radio
- KWDC (FM) Radio (and translators)
- KBXJ (FM) Radio from neighboring Lamesa, Texas
- KTPR (FM) Public Radio licensed nearby Stanton, Texas
- KCWO-TV

== Infrastructure ==
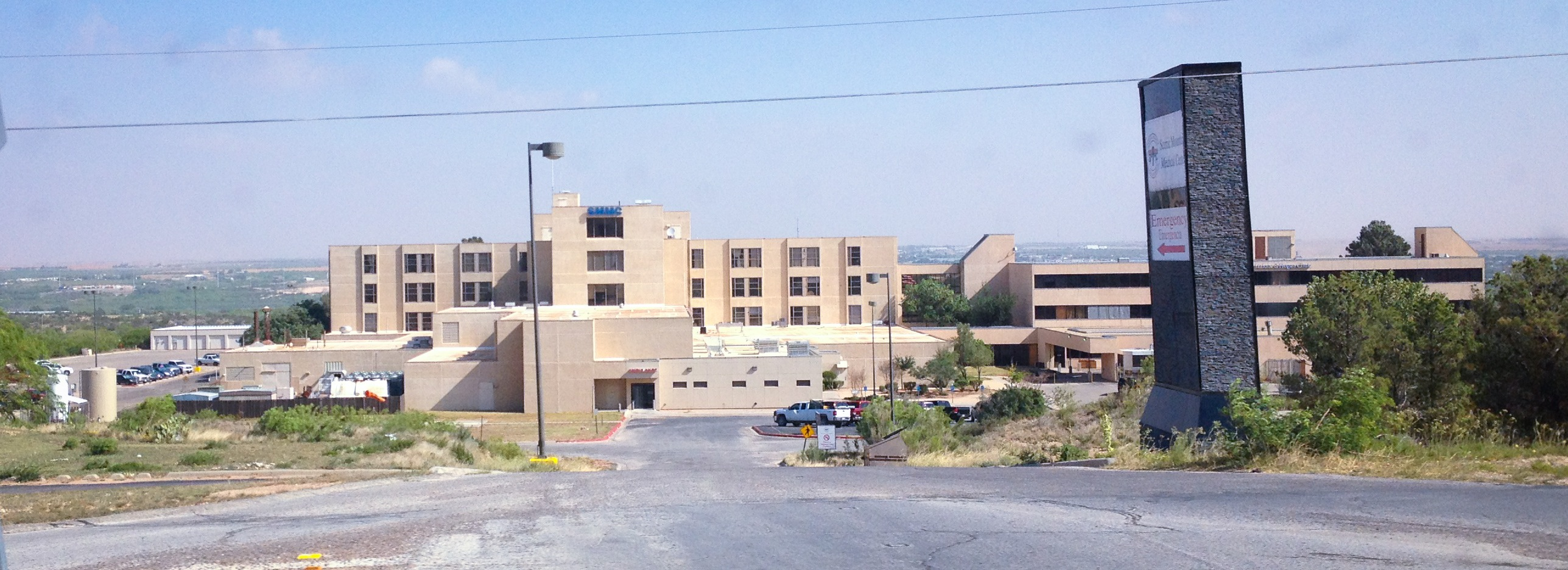
Scenic Mountain Medical Center serves the community.

=== Services and facilities ===
The Texas Department of Criminal Justice operates the Big Spring District Parole Office in the city.

The Texas Department of State Health Services operates a 200-bed psychiatric hospital, opened in 1939. The hospital has reduced its number of beds over the years, but remains one of the largest employers in Big Spring.

The United States Postal Service operates the Big Spring Post Office.

The Federal Bureau of Prisons operates the Federal Correctional Institution, Big Spring in Big Spring. The nearby Big Spring Correctional Center is privately operated (GEO Group) on behalf of the bureau.

The Colorado River Municipal Water District operates a reclaimed water treatment plant in Big Spring, the first of its kind in Texas, the product of which is then delivered to the potable water treatment plants of Big Spring, Stanton, Midland, and Odessa.

=== Organizations ===
- Big Spring Economic Development Corporation
- Big Spring Area Chamber of Commerce
- Big Spring Convention and Visitors Bureau
- Big Spring Symphony Orchestra and Chorus
- Downtown Revitalization Association
- Keep Big Spring Beautiful

=== Major roads and highways ===
- Interstate 20
- U.S. Highway 87
- State Highway 176
- State Highway 350
- Farm to Market Road 669
- Farm to Market Road 700

== Notable people ==
- Larry Arnhart, a writer and scholar, graduated from Big Spring High School in 1967.
- Betty Buckley is a Tony Award-winning theater, film, and television actress and singer.
- Carl Bunch was the drummer for Buddy Holly during the "Winter Dance Party" tour in 1959 in which Holly died (the Day the Music Died), and later for Hank Williams Jr. and Roy Orbison.
- Putt Choate was a National Football League (NFL) player for the Green Bay Packers.
- Mike Christie; was an NHL player for the California Seals, Cleveland Barons, Colorado Rockies and Vancouver Canucks
- Ainslee Cox, conductor
- Tim Dunn, billionaire businessman and conservative political activist
- Sonny Dykes is the current head coach of the TCU Horned Frogs football team.
- Bob Flowers was an American football center who won an NFL Championship with the Green Bay Packers.
- Tony Franklin, professional football player
- Bubba Franks, former NFL tight end for the Green Bay Packers, was born in California, but was raised and played high school football in Big Spring.
- Lefty Frizzell, American country music singer-songwriter and honky-tonk singer who led the house band for a local nightclub "Ace of Clubs" in the early 1950s
- Cynthia Fierro Harvey, United Methodist Church bishop
- Jeane Porter Hester, oncologist and co-developer of IBM 2997, the computerized blood cell separator
- Charley Johnson, NFL quarterback for the St. Louis Cardinals, Houston Oilers, and Denver Broncos
- Dave O'Brien, Western actor
- J. J. Pickle, Democratic United States Representative from the 10th congressional district of Texas from 1963 to 1995
- Stephan Pyles, creator of New Texas cuisine and a founding father of haute Southwestern cuisine
- J. T. Smith, professional football player
- Tom Sorley, president/CEO of Rosendin Electric
- Ryan Tannehill, quarterback for the Tennessee Titans
- Jesse Whittenton, NFL player for the Los Angeles Rams and Green Bay Packers, was a member of the 1961 and 1962 NFL-champion Packers.
- Ronna Reeves, an American country music singer, was nominated by the Academy of Country Music in 1992 for Top New Female Vocalist.
- Jiovany Sanchez, Music Promoter and Founder Of YOKIPROMO

== Sister cities ==
- Hadera, Israel
- San Miguel el Alto, Jalisco, Mexico (2010)
