= Pete Snelson =

American politician (1923–2014)

Member of the Texas Senate
- In office January 14, 1969 – January 11, 1983
- Preceded by: Dorsey B. Hardeman
- Succeeded by: Bill Sims
- Constituency: 25th district
- In office January 12, 1965 – January 10, 1967
- Preceded by: Frank Owen III
- Succeeded by: Joe Christie
- Constituency: 29th district

Member of the Texas House of Representatives from the 102nd district
- In office January 10, 1961 – January 8, 1963

Personal details
- Born: Wallace Eugene Snelson; March 28, 1923 Grandfalls, Texas, U.S.
- Died: April 26, 2014 (aged 91) Georgetown, Texas, U.S.
- Party: Democratic
- Spouse: Susan Sutton (m. 1959)
- Children: 4
- Education: University of Texas at El Paso; Northwestern University

Military service
- Branch/service: United States Army
- Battles/wars: World War II; European theater
- Awards: Bronze Star Medal; Purple Heart

Wallace Eugene "Pete" Snelson (March 28, 1923 – April 26, 2014) was an American politician. He served as a Democratic member for the 102nd district of the Texas House of Representatives. He also served as a member for the 25th and 29th district of the Texas Senate.

== Life and career ==
Snelson was born in Grandfalls, Texas. He attended Grandfalls-Royalty High School, the University of Texas at El Paso and Northwestern University.

Snelson served in the Texas House of Representatives from 1961 to 1963. He then served in the Texas Senate from 1965 to 1967 and again from 1969 to 1983.

Snelson died on April 16, 2014 at his home in Georgetown, Texas, at the age of 91.
