= Monahans =

Monahans can refer to:

- Monahans, Texas
- Monahans Sandhills State Park
- Monahans-Wickett-Pyote Independent School District
- The XScale PXA3xx chips, for which Monahans was a code-name

== See also ==
- Monahan
- Monaghan
