= Southwest Sandhill, Texas =

- Census-designated place
- Location within Texas Location within the United States
- Coordinates: 31°33′26″N 102°54′14″W
- Country: United States
- State: Texas
- County: Ward

Area
  - Total: 7.4 sq mi (19.1 km^{2})
  - Land: 7.4 sq mi (19.1 km^{2})
  - Water: 0 sq mi (0.0 km^{2})
- Elevation: 2,598 ft (792 m)
- Time zone: UTC-6 (Central (CST))
  - Summer (DST): UTC-5 (CDT)
- ZIP Code: 79756 (Monahans)
- Area code: 432
- FIPS code: 48-69353
- GNIS feature ID: 2805847

Southwest Sandhill is an unincorporated area and census-designated place (CDP) in Ward County, Texas, United States. It was first listed as a CDP prior to the 2020 census. As of the 2020 census, Southwest Sandhill had a population of 1,666.

It is in the northeastern part of the county, bordered to the north by Thorntonville and Monahans. Interstate 20 passes through the northern part of the CDP, leading northeast 37 miles (60 km) to Odessa and west-southwest 36 miles (58 km) to Pecos. Texas State Highway 18 runs along the eastern side of the CDP, leading north through Monahans 25 miles (40 km) to Kermit and south 47 miles (76 km) to Fort Stockton .

== Demographics ==
Historical population
Census	Pop.	Note	%±
2020	1,666		—
U.S. Decennial Census; 1850–1900 1910; 1920 1930 1940; 1950 1960 1970; 1980 1990 2000; 2010 2020

Southwest Sandhill first appeared as a census designated place in the 2020 U.S. census.

=== 2020 census ===
Southwest Sandhill CDP, Texas – Racial and ethnic composition Note: the US Census treats Hispanic/Latino as an ethnic category. This table excludes Latinos from the racial categories and assigns them to a separate category. Hispanics/Latinos may be of any race.
Race / Ethnicity (NH = Non-Hispanic)	Pop 2020	% 2020
White alone (NH)	747	44.84%
Black or African American alone (NH)	18	1.08%
Native American or Alaska Native alone (NH)	3	0.18%
Asian alone (NH)	9	0.54%
Native Hawaiian or Pacific Islander alone (NH)	0	0.00%
Other race alone (NH)	1	0.06%
Mixed race or Multiracial (NH)	47	2.82%
Hispanic or Latino (any race)	841	50.48%
Total	1,666	100.00%

As of the 2020 United States census, there were 1,666 people, 388 households, and 231 families residing in the CDP.
