= Senator Christie =

Senator Christie may refer to:

- Gabriel Christie (Maryland politician) (1756–1808), Maryland State Senate
- Joe Christie (born 1933), Texas State Senate
- Robert Christie Jr. (1824–1875), New York State Senate
