= Sonny Dykes =

American football coach (born 1969)

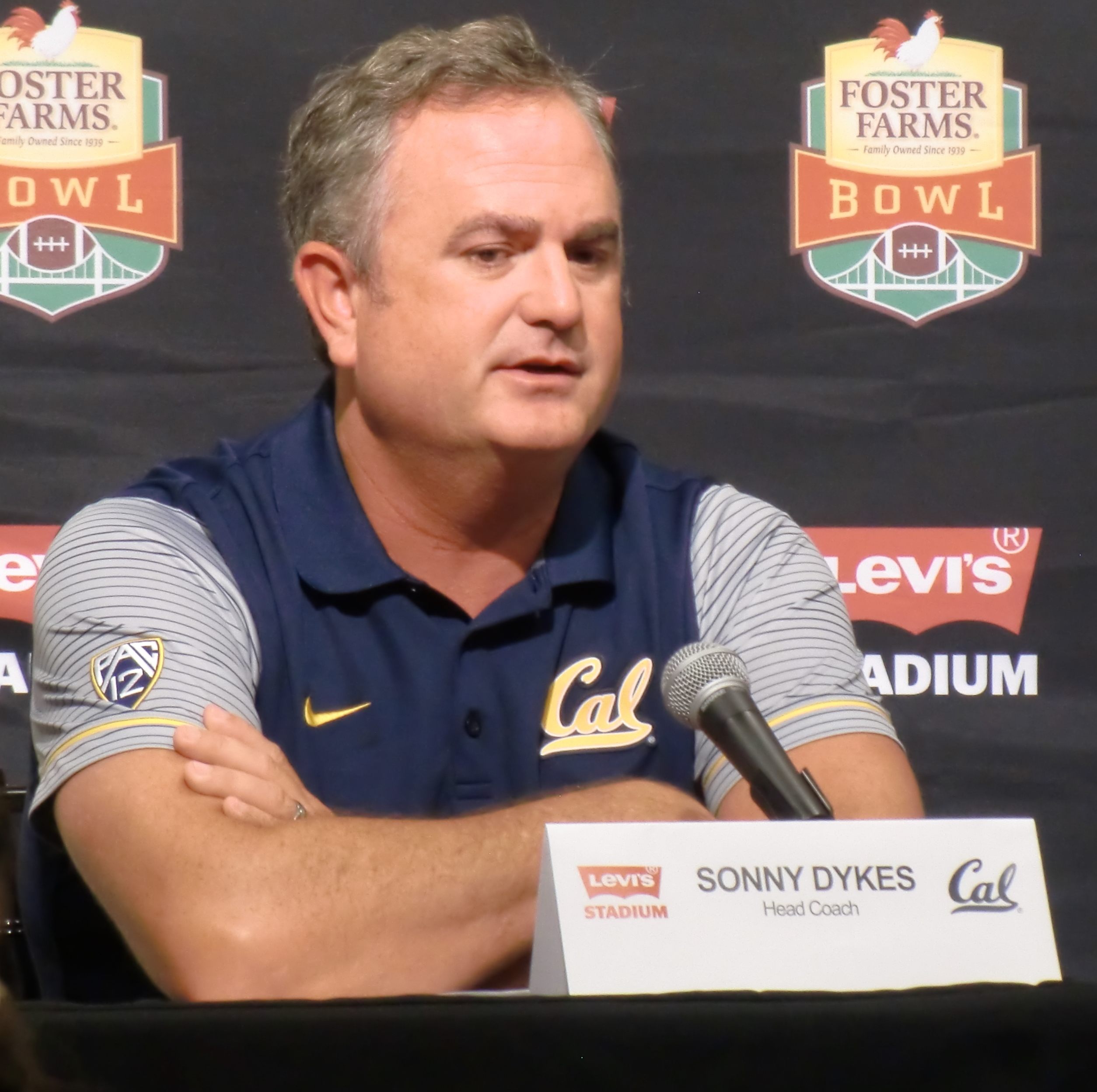
- Dykes at 2016 Bay Area College Football Media Day

Biographical details
- Born: November 9, 1969 (age 57); Big Spring, Texas, U.S.

Playing career

Baseball
- 1989–1993: Texas Tech
- Position: First baseman

Coaching career (HC unless noted)

Football
- 1994: J. J. Pearce HS (TX) (RB)
- 1995: Navarro (RB)
- 1996: Navarro (PGC/QB)
- 1997: Kentucky (GA/TE)
- 1998: Northeast Louisiana (WR)
- 1999: Kentucky (ST/WR)
- 2000–2004: Texas Tech (WR)
- 2005–2006: Texas Tech (co-OC/WR)
- 2007–2009: Arizona (OC/QB)
- 2010–2012: Louisiana Tech
- 2013–2016: California
- 2017: TCU (off. analyst)
- 2018–2021: SMU
- 2022–2026: TCU

Baseball
- 1994: Monahans HS (TX) (assistant)

Head coaching record
- Overall: 112–86
- Bowls: 4–4
- Tournaments: 1–1 (CFP)

Accomplishments and honors

Championships
- 1 WAC (2011)

Awards
- AFCA Coach of the Year Award (2022); AP Coach of the Year (2022); Eddie Robinson Coach of the Year (2022); Walter Camp Coach of the Year (2022); Sporting News Coach of the Year (2022); Home Depot Coach of the Year (2022); Paul "Bear" Bryant Award (2022); WAC Coach of the Year (2011); Big 12 Coach of the Year (2022)

Daniel "Sonny" Dykes (born November 9, 1969) is an American football coach, and a former college baseball player. He was the head football coach at Texas Christian University (TCU) from 2022 to 2026, and previously served in the same role at Southern Methodist University (SMU) from 2018 to 2021, the University of California, Berkeley from 2013 to 2016, and Louisiana Tech University from 2010 to 2012. In his first season at TCU, he led the Horned Frogs to a win in the semifinal and an appearance in the National Championship game.

Dykes, the youngest son of former Texas Tech head coach Spike Dykes, began his career as a high school baseball and football coach in Texas. He then moved to the junior college level as an assistant football coach, including stints with Kentucky, Texas Tech, and Arizona. In 2010, Dykes became a head college football coach for the first time at Louisiana Tech. After a 5–7 record in his first season, Dykes led Louisiana Tech to an 8–5 record in 2011 with a Western Athletic Conference title and followed that with a 9–3 record in 2012. As of 2022, this remains the only conference championship Dykes has won across four head coach jobs. Dykes then became head coach at California in 2013.

After coaching Cal football to its worst season (1–11) in program history in 2013, Dykes improved the team's record to 5–7 in 2014, and then to 8–5 and an Armed Forces Bowl victory in 2015. He finished the 2016 season with 5–7 record, his third losing season in four years at California, and was fired after the season. In 2017, Dykes was hired as head coach at Southern Methodist University. Dykes coached the Mustangs to three winning seasons, including a 10–3 record in 2019 which was the program's best record in more than thirty years. Following his success at Southern Methodist, Dykes was hired as the head coach at Texas Christian University prior to the 2022 season. In his first season at TCU, Dykes led the Horned Frogs to a 12–1 record and the team's first ever College Football Playoff appearance. On December 31, 2022, he led the Horned Frogs to their first-ever CFP win in program history.

== Early years ==
Sonny Dykes graduated from Coronado High School in Lubbock, Texas, where he played both football and baseball. He lettered for three years as a first baseman for the Texas Tech baseball team. Dykes earned a bachelor's degree in history from Texas Tech University in 1993 and a master's degree from the University of Kentucky in 1999.

== Coaching career ==
=== Early career ===
Dykes began his coaching career in the spring of 1994 as an assistant baseball coach at Monahans High School in Monahans, Texas. Later in 1994, Dykes switched to coaching football as the running backs coach for J. J. Pearce High School in Richardson, Texas.

From 1995 to 1996, Dykes coached at Navarro College in Corsicana, Texas. In 1995, he coached the running backs as Navarro posted an 8–2 record. In 1996, he served as the quarterbacks and receivers coach and the passing game coordinator as Navarro finished 7–4 while reaching the Texas junior college championship game. At Navarro, Dykes coached Leroy Fields, who led the nation in receiving and was selected in the seventh-round of the 2000 NFL draft by the Denver Broncos.

In 1998, Dykes served as the wide receivers coach at Northeast Louisiana. Under Dykes' guidance, wide receiver Marty Booker broke all of NLU's single-season and career receiving records and was named first-team All-Independent. Booker played in the Blue-Gray and East-West Shrine all-star games and was selected by the Chicago Bears in the third-round of the 1999 NFL draft.

=== Kentucky ===
In 1997, Dykes served as a graduate assistant and tight ends coach at Kentucky under head coach Hal Mumme.

Dykes returned to Kentucky in 1999 to serve on Mumme's staff as wide receivers coach and special teams coordinator. The season highlights were a victory over #20 Arkansas and a trip to the Music City Bowl. At Kentucky, Dykes coached James Whalen who earned consensus All-America honors and set the all-time NCAA Division I record for receptions by a tight end. Whalen was selected in the fifth-round of the 2000 NFL draft by the Tampa Bay Buccaneers. Dykes also coached wide receiver Quentin McCord who was selected in the seventh-round of the 2001 NFL draft by the Atlanta Falcons. Two of Dykes' players, Derek Smith and Brad Pyatt, signed as undrafted free agents with the Indianapolis Colts in 2002 and 2003, respectively.

=== Texas Tech ===
In 2000, Dykes joined Mike Leach's staff at Texas Tech as the wide receivers coach. Dykes coached wide receiver Carlos Francis who finished his career at Texas Tech with the second-most career touchdowns and third-most career receiving yards, and Francis was selected in the fourth-round of the 2004 NFL draft by the Oakland Raiders. In addition to Francis, Dykes also coached receivers Wes Welker and Derek Dorris who signed free agent contracts with the San Diego Chargers and New York Giants, respectively. During his tenure as the Texas Tech receivers coach, the Red Raiders participated in a bowl game in each of his five years including the 2000 Galleryfurniture.com Bowl, 2001 Alamo Bowl, 2002 Tangerine Bowl, 2003 Houston Bowl, and 2004 Holiday Bowl. Texas Tech finished the 2004 season ranked 17th in the final Coaches Poll, which was the first time the Red Raiders were ranked in a final poll since joining the Big 12 Conference.

After five seasons as the Texas Tech wide receivers coach, Dykes was promoted to co-offensive coordinator alongside Dana Holgorsen in 2005. Texas Tech opened their 2005 season with a 6–0 record, the program's best start since 1998. In 2005, the Red Raiders were trailing Kansas State, 13–10, late in the second quarter but won the game 59–20. Also in 2005, Texas Tech had a halftime lead of 14–10 over Texas A&M. By the end of the game, Texas Tech increased the margin to 56–17. It was the Aggies' worst loss to the Red Raiders in the 64-year-old rivalry. The 2005 season culminated in a trip to the Cotton Bowl Classic and a ranking of 19th in the final Coaches Poll.

In Dykes' second season as co-offensive coordinator, Texas Tech ranked third in passing with 370 passing yards per game and sixth in total offense averaging nearly 450 total yards per game throughout the 2006 season. That season Dykes directed an offense that scored 32 points per game, and two receivers ranked top three in the nation in receptions per game and a third receiver ranked in the top twenty. Dykes helped develop Joel Filani into a two-time first team All-Big 12 honoree and a sixth-round selection in the 2007 NFL draft by the Tennessee Titans. In 2006, receiver Jarrett Hicks caught 13 touchdown passes to set the school's single-season record and signed as a free agent with the San Diego Chargers in 2007. In Dykes last game at Texas Tech, he helped orchestrate the biggest comeback in NCAA Division I-A bowl game history in the 2006 Insight Bowl against Minnesota. With Texas Tech trailing 38–7 in the third quarter, the Red Raiders overcame the 31-point deficit to defeat Minnesota 44–41 in overtime.

=== Arizona ===
Dykes joined Mike Stoops' staff at Arizona as offensive coordinator in 2007. In his first season coaching the Wildcats' offense, Dykes increased Arizona's offensive output by 130 yards per game, and they finished second in the Pac-10 in passing offense with a school-record 308 yards per game. Arizona's pass efficiency rating increased 32 points from 2006 to 2007. In 2007, Arizona set single-season records for passing yards, passing yards per game, completions, touchdown passes and completion percentage, in addition to many single-game records by quarterback Willie Tuitama.

During the 2008 season, Dykes helped lead Arizona to eight victories and the programs first winning year since the 1998 season. Arizona earned their first bowl appearance since 1998 and defeated #16 BYU 31–21 in the 2008 Las Vegas Bowl. In that game, the Wildcats' 31 points were the most in Arizona bowl history. Wide receiver Mike Thomas set the record for the most receptions by any receiver in Pac-10 history. Rob Gronkowski set the school tight end records for single-game, single-season, and career receptions, yards, and touchdowns. Gronkowski was named an Associated Press third-team All-American and All-Pac-10 first-team tight end.

During the 2009 season, Dykes helped lead Arizona to their second consecutive eight-win season and a second place Pac-10 finish, the program's highest since 1998. In the final game of the regular season, Arizona defeated #20 USC 21–17. Arizona finished the regular season ranked #22 in the AP Poll, the Wildcats' first national ranking since the 2000 season. The Wildcats' season culminated with an appearance in the 2009 Holiday Bowl.

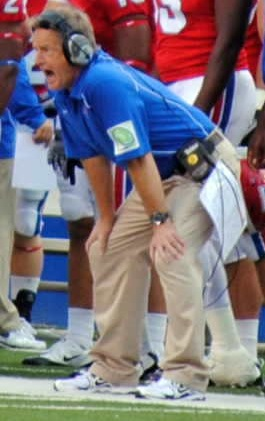
Dykes in 2010

=== Louisiana Tech ===
On January 20, 2010, Dykes was hired to replace Derek Dooley as the head football coach of Louisiana Tech. In Dykes' first season, LA Tech's record improved to 5–7 overall and 4–4 in the WAC. Despite coaching his team to a losing record, LA Tech's offense improved in several areas of the NCAA statistical ranks including passing offense (91st in 2009 to 62nd in 2010) and total offense (66th to 52nd) while the team's average offensive national rank improved from 65th in 2009 to 54th in 2010.

Despite a 1–4 start in 2011, Louisiana Tech rallied to win seven consecutive games to cap off the regular season with the program's first WAC football title since 2001 and an appearance in the Poinsettia Bowl, a 31–24 loss to TCU. As a result of LA Tech's success, Dykes was honored as the 2011 WAC Coach of the Year. At the conclusion of the 2011 season, Dykes signed a contract extension to increase his base salary to at least $700,000.

In 2012, Louisiana Tech finished with a 9–3 record, the program's best since 1997, but was not invited to a bowl game. Dykes guided the Bulldogs to a 22–15 record over his 3 seasons as head coach.

=== California ===
On December 5, 2012, Dykes was announced as the 33rd head football coach at the University of California, Berkeley.

==== 2013 ====
Shortly after being named Cal's head coach, Dykes stated that the "most important hire that I make is hiring a defensive coordinator that will come in and get to work from Day 1 and get a defense established." He further stated that his number one job was to "hire the best defensive coordinator I can find in the United States." In one of his first major decisions as head coach, Dykes hired Andy Buh to serve as his defensive coordinator. In Dykes' first season, the California defense surrendered the most passing yards in Division 1 college football history, leading to it becoming the worst defense in the nation. This eventually led to Buh being reassigned to a non-coaching administrative role.

The Golden Bears struggled in Dykes' first season, finishing with a 1–11 record. Dykes' first season marked the first time since Cal began playing football in 1886 that the team failed to defeat a single D-1 FBS opponent in a season that has lasted at least five games. Dykes inherited Jared Goff who was recruited in 2012 by Dykes predecessor Jeff Tedford. Dykes named Jared Goff as the team's starting quarterback, making him the first true freshman quarterback to start a season opener in Cal history. Goff went on to set a new Cal record with 3,508 passing yards and an NCAA record for most completions in a season by a freshman with 330. Cal finished the year losing to arch-rival Stanford by 50 points, the largest margin ever in the 119-year history of the Big Game.

==== 2014 ====
In February of 2014, California dealt with a tragedy as 21-year-old defensive tackle Ted Agu died during an overly strenuous work out. The football team that year improved to 5–7, jumping out to a 4–1 start, before losing six of their final seven games. Cal averaged 38.3 points per game, second-best in the Pac-12 and 11th-best in FBS, generating a program-record 459 total points for the season. However, the Golden Bears surrendered 367.2 passing yards per game and 42 total passing touchdowns, both ranked last out of 128 FBS teams. During a three-game stretch from Week 3 to Week 5, Cal played consecutive high-scoring games that were won or lost in the final seconds The Bears lost on a Hail Mary pass to Arizona 49–45, then beat Colorado 59–56 in double overtime. The following week, Cal allowed an FBS-record 734 passing yards to Washington State quarterback Connor Halliday, but still won 60–59 when WSU missed a 19-yard field goal with 15 seconds to play.

Dykes' defense struggled even worse in 2014 under the coordination of Art Kaufman (Dykes' third defensive coordinator in as many years), surrendering the most yards in the history of college football.

==== 2015 ====
In 2015, Dykes and the Golden Bears jumped out to a 5–0 start, their best since 2007. In Week 3, Cal traveled to Austin and defeated the Texas Longhorns 45–44, marking the program's first-ever victory over Texas. The following week, Cal beat the Washington Huskies 30–24, Cal's first victory in Seattle since 2005, snapping a six-game losing streak to Washington.

After a grueling back half of the schedule that included away games at Utah, Oregon, and Stanford, Cal finished the season 7–5. 2015 marked California's first winning season since 2011. The Golden Bear's season culminated in a 55–36 victory against Air Force in the Armed Forces Bowl at Amon G. Carter Stadium. Dykes high powered attack finished 5th in the nation for completions per game (27.1), 3rd in passing yards per game (375.9), 2nd in passing touchdowns per game (3.4), and 8th in total yards per game (528.8).

Cal then went on to lose five of its next six games, including losses to rivals UCLA (by 16 points), USC (6 points), Oregon (16 points), and a 13-point loss to arch-rival Stanford. In a 54–24 win over the last place Oregon State Beavers, Cal tallied a school-record 760 yards and became bowl-eligible for the first time since 2011. With a 48–46 win over Arizona State on Senior Day, Cal finished the regular season with a 7–5 record, clinching their first winning season since 2011. Nevertheless, Cal finished the season in the bottom half of the Pac-12 standings for the third time in three years under Dykes.

==== 2016 ====
Shortly after the conclusion of the 2015 season, Dykes stated that he did not anticipate any staff turnover. However, offensive coordinator Tony Franklin resigned from his position at California a few weeks after Dykes made this statement. Franklin left to take up the same position at Middle Tennessee State, citing a desire to move closer to his family in Kentucky. Dykes replaced Franklin with Jake Spavital, who had recently been fired by Texas A&M University. Spavital served as the offensive coordinator and quarterbacks coach in 2016 before being promoted to interim head coach following Dykes' firing.

Despite the offseason coaching change at offensive coordinator, Dykes' offense still ranked in the top 5 nationally for pass completions per game (31.9) and passing yards per game (358.8). Additionally, Cal finished 2nd in the nation for total plays run per game, averaging 86.3.

Dykes and the Golden Bears finished the season with a record of 5–7, which included wins over #11 Texas and #18 Utah.

On January 8, 2017, Sonny Dykes was fired as the head coach of the Cal Golden Bears.

==== Performance in rivalry games ====
Dykes had only one win against any of Cal's in-state Pac-12 rivals. Altogether, his teams lost to UCLA, USC, and Stanford 11 times in the four years that he coached the Golden Bears. Dykes' teams lost to division rival Oregon in his first three outings before beating the Ducks in 2016.

==== Contract extension, interviews, and firing ====
At the conclusion of the 2015 regular season, Dykes was reported to have interviewed for college football coaching positions at Missouri, Virginia, and South Carolina. None of these schools made Dykes an offer to hire him as head coach. Dykes nevertheless negotiated an extension with the University of California. Less than a year after receiving this extension, Dykes interviewed for the head coaching vacancy at Baylor University, but Baylor athletic director Mack Rhoades instead decided to hire Matt Rhule.

On January 8, 2017, California fired Dykes. Under contract through the 2019 season, Dykes was owed $5.88 million, 70 percent of his remaining base salary and talent fee. Besides his losing record, California Athletic Director Mike Williams has stated that Dykes had never "settled into California, the Bay Area or the Cal experience" as reasons for the firing.

=== SMU ===
==== 2017 ====
Starting in the Fall of 2017, Dykes spent one year as the Offensive Analyst on Gary Patterson's TCU staff. That year there were two Sonnys on the TCU coaching staff – Sonny Dykes and Sonny Cumbie. After this season, Sonny Dykes moved on to coach at SMU. Later (2022) Sonny Cumbie became head coach at Louisiana Tech.

==== 2018 ====
In 2018, Dykes' first season in charge, the Mustangs finished 5–7, going 4–4 in the American Conference.

==== 2019 ====
Dykes turned everything around in 2019, doubling SMU's wins from the year prior. The Mustangs' 10-win season was its first since 1984. SMU's offense, which was ranked 81st in 2018, finished as the ninth-ranked total offense in the country in 2019. The Mustangs averaged 11.4 more points per game (41.8) and 102.5 more yards per game (489.8) than the previous year. This drastic change was largely due to the improvement in SMU's rushing attack, going from 115.6 yards per game in 2018 to 180.8 yards per game in 2019. On the other side of the ball, SMU led the FBS in sacks per game with 3.92 and ranked third for tackles for loss per game with 8.54. SMU's 51 sacks and 111 tackles for loss were both school records. As a result of SMU's record-breaking season, the Mustangs had nine players garner all-conference honors, its highest since 2011. Dykes also received recognition, as he was named a finalist for the Eddie Robinson Coach of the Year Award and the Paul "Bear" Bryant Award.

==== 2020 ====
Despite gaining 494.5 yards per game in 2020, SMU's offense fell to the 12th-ranked offense in the FBS. The Mustangs gained 500+ yards of total offense in six out of ten games. Dyke's red zone offense was near-perfect, going 46-of-50 (92%) inside the 20. SMU finished the COVID-shortened season 7–3, highlighted by a win over No. 25 Memphis. The Mustangs were originally slated to play UTSA in the 2020 Frisco Bowl, but the game was canceled due to COVID-19 complications within the team.

==== 2021 ====
Prior to the 2021 season, Dykes and his staff brought in the highest-rated SMU recruiting class since 247Sports started recruiting class rankings in 1999. The success continued on the field as the Mustangs racked up 466.8 yards and 38.4 points per game. SMU finished the season 8–4 and was invited to play in the 2021 Fenway Bowl against Virginia, which was cancelled due to COVID-19. Dykes left the program at the conclusion of the 2021 regular season to take the head coaching job at TCU.

Dykes was 30–18 at SMU with a 25–10 record over his last three seasons. Included in that total were SMU's first consecutive victories over TCU since 1992–93. His .625 winning percentage ranked fourth in program history for head coaches of more than two seasons. The 25 victories over three years tied for the second-most by an FBS team in Texas and just one off the lead. The 2019 Mustangs went 10–3, SMU's most wins since 1984, and earned their highest national ranking (14) since 1985.

=== TCU ===
==== 2022 ====
On November 29, 2021, Dykes was announced as the new head coach of the TCU Horned Frogs, flying across the Metroplex from Dallas to Fort Worth in a helicopter that landed on the field at Amon G. Carter Stadium for an introductory ceremony ahead of the official press conference, which was held the next day. Dykes becomes the third coach to lead both the Texas Christian Horned Frogs and the Southern Methodist Mustangs; Ewing Y. Freeland and Matty Bell also led both programs in the century-old Iron Skillet match-up. Dykes won his debut with the Horned Frogs in a 38–13 victory over Colorado. TCU finished the 2022 regular season with a 12–0 record but lost the 2022 Big 12 Championship Game against the Kansas State Wildcats in overtime. Despite the loss, the Horned Frogs were ranked third in the final College Football Playoff rankings and defeated the Michigan Wolverines 51–45 in the Fiesta Bowl. They subsequently lost the College Football National Championship Game to Georgia 65–7. For his coaching success in the 2022 season, Dykes won numerous awards. He earned the AFCA Coach of the Year, AP Coach of the Year, Big 12 Coach of the Year, Eddie Robinson Coach of the Year, Home Depot Coach of the Year, Bear Bryant Coach of the Year, and Walter Camp Coach of the Year Awards.

==== 2023–2026 ====
TCU opened the 2023 season ranked #17 before being upset by Colorado and a debuting Deion Sanders. The Horned Frogs could not recover from this loss, and finished just 5–7 in 2023.

TCU enjoyed more sustained success under Dykes in 2024, finishing with a 9–4 record and a blowout 34–3 win in the New Mexico Bowl. In the 2025 season, he led the team to a 8–4 mark in the regular season. The season ended with a 30–27 overtime win over USC in the Alamo Bowl.

TCU fired Dykes on November 22, 2026, with one game remaining in the 2026 season. TCU was 5–6 at the time.

== Family ==
Dykes is the son of Spike Dykes and Sharon Dykes. His father, Spike, was head coach at Texas Tech from 1986 to 1999. His mother, Sharon, died in 2010 after a lengthy battle with Alzheimer's disease. Dykes' wife, Kate, is the sister of current UTEP basketball coach Joe Golding. He and Kate have two daughters, Ally and Charlie, and a son, Daniel.

== Head coaching record ==
Year	Team	Overall	Conference	Standing	Bowl/playoffs	Coaches^{#}	AP^{°}
Louisiana Tech Bulldogs (Western Athletic Conference) (2010–2012)
2010	Louisiana Tech	5–7	4–4	5th			
2011	Louisiana Tech	8–5	6–1	1st	L Poinsettia		
2012	Louisiana Tech	9–3	4–2	3rd			
Louisiana Tech:		22–15	14–7				
California Golden Bears (Pac-12 Conference) (2013–2016)
2013	California	1–11	0–9	6th (North)			
2014	California	5–7	3–6	4th (North)			
2015	California	8–5	4–5	T–4th (North)	W Armed Forces		
2016	California	5–7	3–6	T–4th (North)			
California:		19–30	10–26				
SMU Mustangs (American Athletic Conference) (2017–2021)
2017	SMU	0–1 (Note: Chad Morris served as SMU's head coach for the 2017 regular season, leading the Mustangs to a record of 7–5 with a mark of 4–4 in conference play to tie for third place in the West Division of the American Athletic Conference. Dykes coached the Mustangs in the 2017 Frisco Bowl after Morris resigned to take the head coaching job at the University of Arkansas. SMU finished the season with an overall record of 7–6.)	0–0	(West)	L Frisco		
2018	SMU	5–7	4–4	4th (West)			
2019	SMU	10–3	6–2	3rd (West)	L Boca Raton		
2020	SMU	7–3	4–3	5th	Frisco (Note: The 2020 Frisco Bowl was cancelled due to COVID-19 issues and ruled a no contest.)		
2021	SMU	8–4	4–4	6th	Fenway (Note: Dykes served as SMU's head coach for the 2021 regular season, before leaving to take the head coaching job at Texas Christian University. Jim Leavitt was appointed interim head coach for the 2021 Fenway Bowl, however, the game was cancelled.)		
SMU:		30–18	18–13				
TCU Horned Frogs (Big 12 Conference) (2022–2026)
2022	TCU	13–2	9–0	1st	W Fiesta^{†}, L CFP NCG^{†}	2	2
2023	TCU	5–7	3–6	T–9th			
2024	TCU	9–4	6–3	T–5th	W New Mexico		
2025	TCU	9–4	5–4	T–7th	W Alamo		25
2026	TCU	5–6	3–5	(Note: TCU fired Dykes with one game remaining.)			
TCU:		41–23	26–18				
Total:		112–86					
National championship Conference title Conference division title or championship game berth
^{†}Indicates CFP / New Years' Six bowl.; ^{#}Rankings from final Coaches Poll.; ^{°}Rankings from final AP Poll.
