= West Texas State School =

Former juvenile correctional facility in Texas, United States

Coordinates: 31°31′31″N 103°07′49″W

The West Texas State School (WTSS, originally the West Texas Children's Home of Pyote) was a juvenile detention facility operated by the Texas Youth Commission that closed on August 31, 2010. It was located in unincorporated central Ward County, Texas, along the southwestern edge of Pyote, on Interstate 20 between El Paso and Midland. The former school was about 17 miles (27 km) west of Monahans, 50 miles (80 km) west of Midland and Odessa, and 230 miles east of El Paso.

== History ==
The West Texas Children's Home of Pyote, a Texas Youth Council orphanage for neglected children, opened on the former Pyote Air Force Station in 1966. The 1979 closure of the Gatesville State School meant that some children who formerly lived in that correctional facility began to live in the West Texas Children's Home. In the 1980s the facility was converted into a juvenile detention facility for males. In 1993 fencing was added.

Prior to 2007 about 270 inmates lived in the state school and about 300 employees worked there. In 2007 investigative report by State Auditor John Keel recommended the closure of the facility, saying that it is too remote to sufficient employment bases.

By 2010 most of the employees at WTSS came from towns around Pyote such as Kermit, Monahans, and Pecos. The last student at the West Texas State School was transferred out of the institution on Friday May 28, 2010. On Tuesday June 1, 2010, the West Texas State School closed. In August 2010 TYC gave the lands back to University of Texas Lands.

=== Child sexual abuse scandal ===
On February 23, 2007, The Texas Observer published a news story detailing allegations of child sexual abuse by staff members at the West Texas State School. Following an investigation by the Texas Rangers and the FBI in February and March 2005, two of the highest-ranking officials at the school, assistant superintendent Ray Brookins and the school principal had been accused of having sexual relations with several students over an extended period. (Brookins was later convicted, but the second man was cleared of all charges). On February 28 Republican Governor Rick Perry dismissed chairman Pete C. Alfaro, who had been named to the commission in 1995 by then Republican governor George W. Bush, and called for the dismissal of acting executive director Neil Nichols.

On March 2, more allegations surfaced of sexual abuse at the Ron Jackson State Juvenile Correctional Facility in Brownwood, leaving McAllen Democrat Juan Hinojosa to state that the situation at Pyote "is not an isolated incident." The same day, the Austin American-Statesman reported its possession of an internal report on the sexual abuse misconduct investigations, with four extra paragraphs that were redacted in the final public version detailing involvement of several top officials in 2005. Also on the same day, Gov. Rick Perry appointed Jay Kimbrough as "Special Master".

As the scandal gained public attention, more allegations were uncovered. The TYC admitted that at least 10 teenage boys were sexually abused at the West Texas State School, and newspapers reported on some 750 complaints of sexual misconduct against correctional officers and other TYC employees since January 2000. TYC Inspector General Ray Worsham was later implicated in the alteration of the misconduct investigations report. On March 28, Gov. Perry appointed Kimbrough conservator of the TYC.
