= Pyote, Texas =

Town in Ward County, Texas, United States

- Town
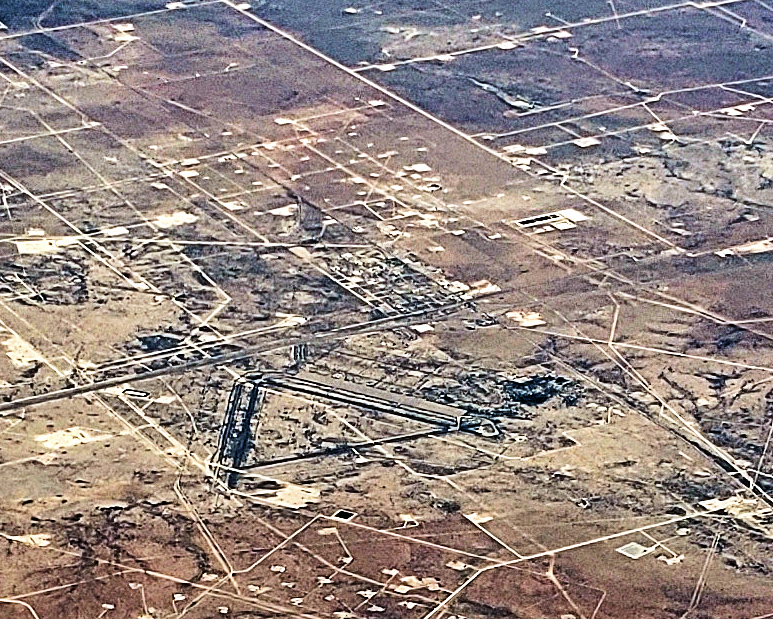
- Aerial photo of the town, October 2021

- Location of Pyote in Ward County
- Coordinates: 31°32′15″N 103°7′36″W
- Country: United States
- State: Texas
- County: Ward

Area
  - Total: 1.27 sq mi (3.30 km^{2})
  - Land: 1.27 sq mi (3.30 km^{2})
  - Water: 0 sq mi (0.00 km^{2})
- Elevation: 2,600 ft (800 m)

Population (2020)
  - Total: 72
  - Density: 56.5/sq mi (21.81/km^{2})
- Time zone: UTC-6 (Central (CST))
  - Summer (DST): UTC-5 (CDT)
- ZIP code: 79777
- Area code: 432
- FIPS code: 48-59996
- GNIS feature ID: 1365876

Pyote (/ˈpaɪoʊt/ PY-oht) is a town in Ward County, Texas, United States. Its population was 72 at the 2020 census.

== History ==
Pyote began as a small town. Its fortunes rose with oil, but its population decreased when the railroad was built away from the town. At one time, Pyote had 3,500 residents. The 1942 development of the Pyote Army Air Base and the 1967 development of what became the West Texas State School raised the town's fortunes.

== Geography ==
Pyote is located at 31°32′15″N 103°7′36″W (31.537478, –103.126771). According to the United States Census Bureau, the town has a total area of 1.3 square miles (3.3 km^{2}), all land.

=== Climate ===
This area has a large amount of sunshine year round due to its stable descending air and high pressure. According to the Köppen climate classification, Pyote has a desert climate, Bwh on climate maps.

== Demographics ==
Historical population
Census	Pop.	Note	%±
1960	420		—
1970	155		−63.1%
1980	382		146.5%
1990	348		−8.9%
2000	131		−62.4%
2010	114		−13.0%
2020	72		−36.8%

As of the census of 2000, 131 people, 56 households, and 32 families were residing in the town. The population density was 101.5 people per sq mi (39.2/km^{2}). The 85 housing units averaged 65.9 per sq mi (25.4/km^{2}). The racial makeup of the town was 83.97% White, 1.53% African American, 6.87% Native American, 4.58% from other races, and 3.05% from two or more races. Hispanics or Latinos of any race were 22.90% of the population.

Of the 56 households, 26.8% had children under 18 living with them, 46.4% were married couples living together, 10.7% had a female householder with no husband present, and 41.1% were not families. About 37.5% of all households were made up of individuals, and 12.5% had someone living alone who was 65 or older. The average household size was 2.34, and the average family size was 3.09.

In the town, the age distribution was 26.0% under 18, 6.1% from 18 to 24, 22.9% from 25 to 44, 26.7% from 45 to 64, and 18.3% who were 65 or older. The median age was 40 years. For every 100 females, there were 81.9 males. For every 100 females age 18 and over, there were 94.0 males.

The median income for a household was $25,625, and for a family was $30,833. Males had a median income of $31,250 versus $20,750 for females. The per capita income for the town was $11,505. There were 6.3% of families and 15.3% of the population living below the poverty line, including 17.1% of those under 18 and 9.1% of those over 64.

== Government and infrastructure ==
An unincorporated area near Pyote is the site of the former Pyote Army Air Base. It was home to the West Texas State School, a youth detention facility operated by the Texas Youth Commission, until its 2010 closure.

The United States Postal Service operates the Pyote Post Office.

== Education ==
The Town of Pyote is served by the Monahans-Wickett-Pyote Independent School District. All of Ward County is zoned to Odessa College.

== See also ==
- List of municipalities in Texas
