= Wayne Hansen =

American football player (1928–1987)

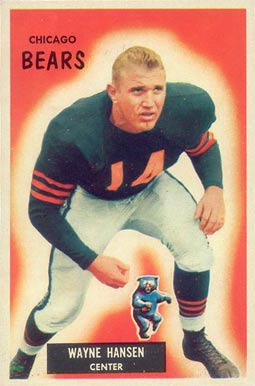
- Hansen on a 1955 Bowman football card

No. 14, 51, 52
- Positions: Linebacker, offensive lineman

Personal information
- Born: October 6, 1928; McCamey, Texas, U.S.
- Died: August 24, 1987 (aged 58); El Paso, Texas, U.S.
- Listed height: 6 ft 2 in (1.88 m)
- Listed weight: 231 lb (105 kg)

Career information
- High school: Monahans (TX)
- College: Texas-El Paso
- NFL draft: 1950: 6th round, 76th overall pick

Career history
- Chicago Bears (1950–1958); Dallas Cowboys (1960)

Awards and highlights
- All-Border Conference (1949); 3× Pro Bowl (1956, 1957, 1958)

Career NFL statistics
- Games played: 111
- Games started: 84
- Interceptions: 6
- Fumble recoveries: 12
- Stats at Pro Football Reference

George Wayne Hansen (October 6, 1928 – August 24, 1987) was an American professional football linebacker in the National Football League (NFL) for the Chicago Bears and Dallas Cowboys. He played college football at the University of Texas, El Paso.

== Early life ==
Hansen was born in McCamey, Texas and attended Monahans High School. He accepted a football scholarship from the University of Texas at El Paso, where he played nose tackle, linebacker and center.

He opened holes for running backs Fred Wendt and Pug Gabrel, helping the team lead the nation in rushing in 1948. He was a part of back-to-back Sun Bowl appearances and returned a kickoff 51 yards for a touchdown, to clinch a 33-20 victory over Georgetown University in the 1950 Sun Bowl.

In 1973, he was inducted into El Paso Athletic Hall of Fame. In 2013, he was inducted into the UTEP Athletic Hall of Fame. In 2014, he was named to the UTEP's Centennial football team. In 2008, he was named to the 75th Anniversary All-Sun Bowl team.

== Professional career ==
=== Chicago Bears ===
Hansen was selected in the sixth round (76th overall) of the 1950 NFL draft. He became the starter at center as a rookie, displacing Clyde "Bulldog" Turner.

He played center, offensive guard and defensive tackle, before being converted to linebacker in 1955. He was also the team's defensive captain during most of his time with the Bears.

He temporarily retired at the end of the 1957 season. On November 10, 1958, because of injuries, he was lured out of retirement to help the team. He retired again at the end of the year.

=== Dallas Cowboys ===
In 1960, the Dallas Cowboys convinced him to come out of retirement to be a part of their inaugural season. He became one of the first starters at outside linebacker in franchise history (the other was Gene Cronin). He retired at the end of the year, having missed only two games in 10 seasons.

== Personal life ==
Besides having different business interests, he served as an assistant football coach at Texas Western, Oklahoma, and Stanford. On August 24, 1987, he died after battling bone cancer.
