= Grandfalls-Royalty High School =

Location
- 108 Ave C Grandfalls, Texas 79742-0010; United States; 31.340944°N 102.851220°W

Information
- School type: Public high school
- School district: Grandfalls-Royalty Independent School District
- Principal: Cameron Lynch
- Staff: 14.96 (FTE)
- Grades: PK-12
- Enrollment: 138 (2023–2024)
- Student to teacher ratio: 9.22
- Colors: Red & White
- Athletics conference: UIL Class A
- Mascot: Cowboy/Cowgirl
- Website: Grandfalls-Royalty High School

Grandfalls-Royalty High School is a public high school located in Grandfalls, Texas (USA) and classified as a 1A school by the UIL. It is part of the Grandfalls-Royalty Independent School District located in southeast Ward County. In 2015, the school was rated "Met Standard" by the Texas Education Agency.

In 2014, voters approved a $12,200,000 bond issue for constructing a new K-12 school to replace existing facilities.

== Athletics ==
The Grandfalls-Royalty Cowboys compete in basketball, cross country, six-man football, tennis, track and field, and volleyball. They won a state title in six-man football (6M/D2) in 2013.

== Notable alumni ==
- Norm Cox, American player of gridiron football
