= Grandfalls-Royalty Independent School District =

School district in Texas

Coordinates: 31.3407°N 102.8515°W

Grandfalls-Royalty Independent School District is a public school district based in Grandfalls, Texas (USA).

In addition to Grandfalls, the district also serves the unincorporated community of Royalty.

Grandfalls-Royalty ISD has one school that serves students in grades pre-kindergarten through twelve.

== Academic achievement ==
In 2013 Grandfalls-Royalty ISD was rated "Met Standard" and received distinctions in "Academic Achievement in Reading/ELA", "Academic Achievement in Mathematics", and a "Top 25 Percent Student Progress" distinction.

== Special programs ==
=== Athletics ===
Grandfalls-Royalty High School plays six-man football.

== See also ==
- List of school districts in Texas
