= Gary Cartwright =

American journalist (1934–2017)

Gary D. Cartwright (August 10, 1934 – February 22, 2017) was an American journalist who worked for Texas Monthly from the 1970s until the 2010s. He wrote gonzo journalism and was compared to Hunter S. Thompson.

== Biography ==
Cartwright was born on August 10, 1934, in Dallas, and grew up in Royalty through the 1930s; his father operated a Texaco gas station there. His family moved to Arlington during World War II, with his mother working for a dress store there. He studied at the University of Texas at Arlington and the University of Texas at Austin, graduating from Texas Christian University following two years of service in the United States Army.

Encouraged by an English teacher at Arlington High School, which Cartwright attended, Cartwright began working in journalism in the 1950s. His first job in journalism was writing for the Fort Worth Star-Telegram. He later worked for the Fort Worth Press, where he was nicknamed "Jap" due to being mistaken for an Asian American intern by a colleague. Ann Richards also called him the nickname, which she purposefully avoided doing during her tenure as Governor of Texas.

In Cartwight's obituary in The New York Times, he was compared to Hunter S. Thompson, as he wrote gonzo journalism. Previously a writer for Harper's Magazine and Sports Illustrated, he wrote for Texas Monthly from 1975 until his 2010 retirement. One of his first articles covered investigator Jay J. Armes, and his most noted articles covered the trial of Jack Ruby. Also a novelist and screenwriter, he coauthored the scripts of J. W. Coop (1971), A Pair of Aces (1990), and Pancho, Billy and Esmerelda (1994). He also taught journalism to Nicholas Lemann.

Cartwright retired in 2010. In 1998, he suffered a heart attack. Following his recovery, he wrote HeartWiseGuy, a memoir about his sex life as an old man. In 2015, he published The Best I Recall, also a memoir. His work was included in Lone Star Literature, an anthology published in 2003.

Cartwright married designer named Barbara and had two children with her, one dying of leukemia in 1997. On February 10, 2017, he was hospitalized from a fall which left him on the floor undiscovered for several days. He died on February 22, aged 82, which was announced by his friend, writer Jan Reid. He was buried on March 4, in the Texas State Cemetery, which was followed by a wake at Scholz Garten.
