= Odessa Meteor Crater =

Impact crater in west Texas

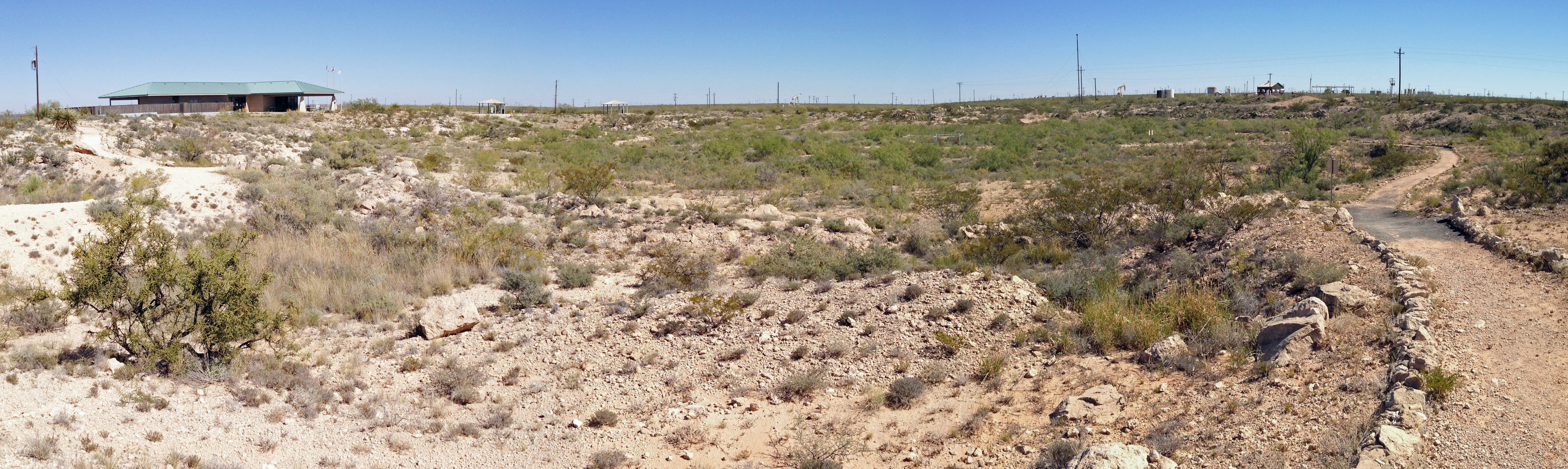
- Meteor crater and museum in 2013

- Location within Texas
- Location: Ector County, West Texas, United States; 31.7560°N 102.4788°W

Impact crater structure
- Confidence: Confirmed
- Diameter: 550 ft (168 m)
- Depth: 100 ft (30 m)
- Age: 63,500 years
- Exposed: Yes
- Drilled: Yes
- Bolide type: Octahedrite (IAB)

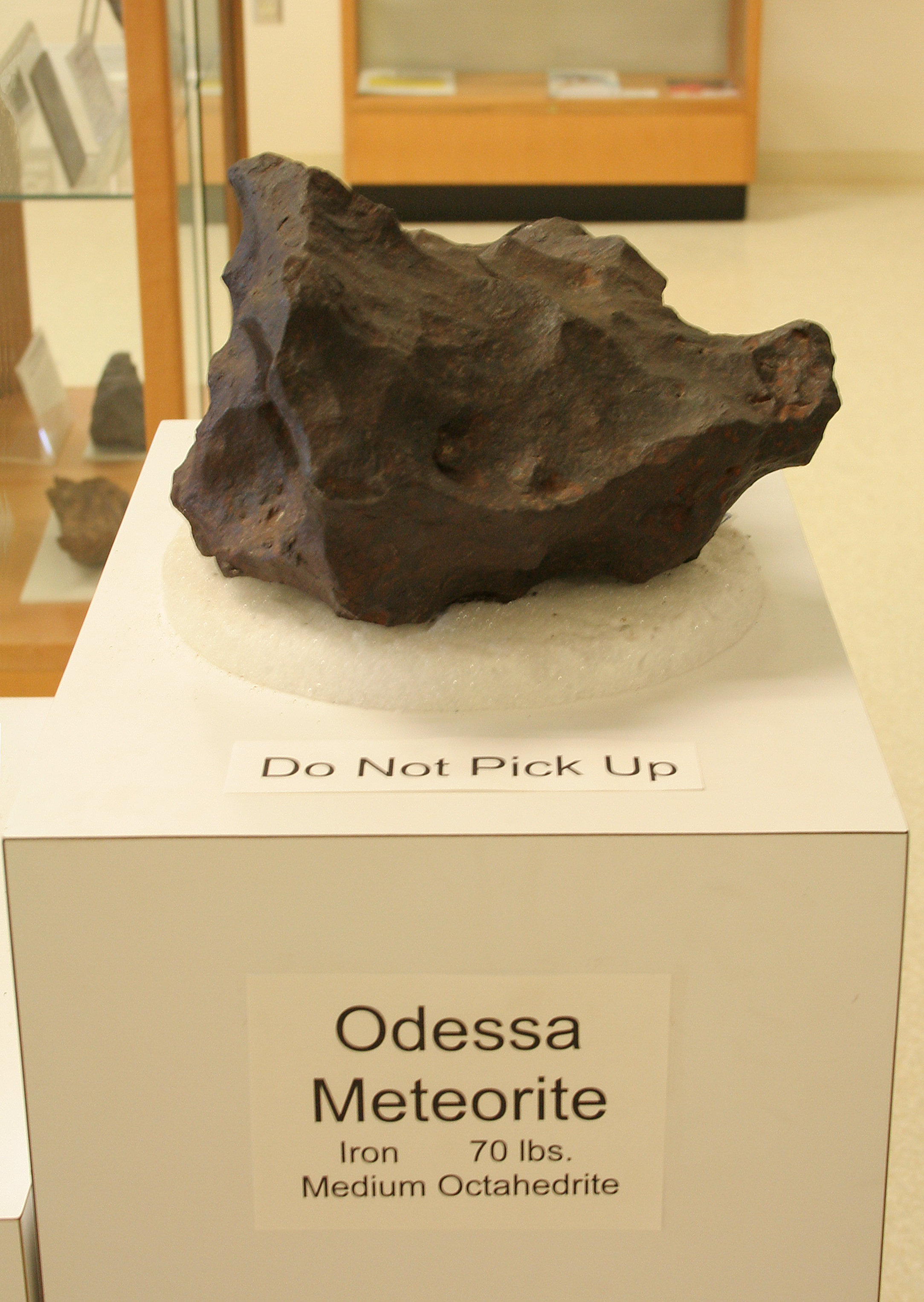
70-pound sample of the meteorite

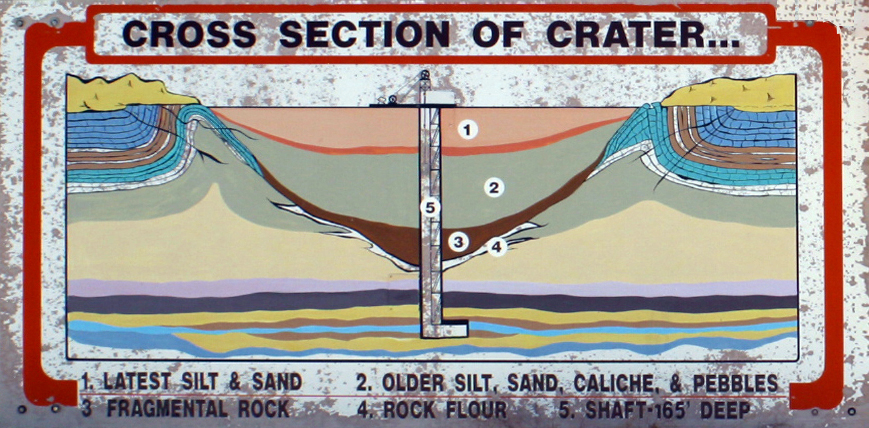
Cross section of the crater

The Odessa Meteor Crater is a meteorite crater in the southwestern part of Ector County, southwest of the city of Odessa of West Texas, United States. It is accessible approximately 3 mi (5 km) south of Interstate 20 at Exit 108 (Moss Road). This is one of three impact crater sites found in Texas, the others being the older and much larger Sierra Madera crater and the Marquez crater.

The Handbook of Texas Online describes the Odessa meteor crater as the largest of several smaller craters in the immediate area that were formed by the impact of thousands of octahedrites (an iron metallic type) that fell in prehistoric times.

The web site of the University of Texas of the Permian Basin (UTPB, Center for Energy and Economic Diversification), identifies five craters at the Odessa site and shows a distribution map of the meteorite fragments recovered from the area. The recoveries have generally come from an area to the north and northwest of the main crater site, with only a few found to the south. They indicate that the structure of the main crater, because it was one of the earliest to be recognized and studied, is now used to name similar impact sites on a worldwide basis. Over 1500 meteorites have been recovered from the surrounding area over the years, the largest of which weighed approximately 300 lb (136 kg), but excavations in the main crater confirm that there is no meteorite mass underground and probably never has been. The site has been designated as a National Natural Landmark by the National Park Service, and a small information area and nature trail has been set up on-site for a self-guided tour.

It is 550 ft (168 m) in diameter and the age is estimated to be around 63,500 years (Pleistocene or younger). The crater is exposed to the surface, and was originally about 100 ft (30 m) deep. Because of subsequent infilling by soil and debris, the crater is currently 15 ft (5 m) deep at its lowest point, which provides enough relief to be visible over the surrounding plains, but does not offer the dramatic relief found at the more famous Meteor Crater in Arizona.

An iron meteorite fragment was first discovered in 1921 and described in the American Journal of Science in 1922; the depression where the meteorite was found was first described as a crater in 1927. The crater itself and the museum curator, Tom Rodman, were featured in the June 1, 2013 broadcast of Bob Phillips's syndicated television series Texas Country Reporter.

== See also ==
- Impact crater
- List of impact craters in North America
- Marquez crater
- Meteor Crater
- Monahans Sandhills State Park
- Sierra Madera crater
