= Royalty, Texas =

Unincorporated community in Texas, US

Coordinates: 31°22′21″N 102°52′02″W

Royalty is an unincorporated community in Ward County, Texas, United States. Before a post office was opened in 1929, it was known as Allentown, after an early landowner. In 1933, Royalty had an estimated population of twenty, and a hotel, drugstore, café, pool hall, barbershop, and laundry. Its population peaked at 750 in 1940. With declining oilfield activity, the population had fallen to approximately 190 by 1968. In 1990 the population was reported as 196. The population dropped to twenty-nine in 2000, and the community currently has a population under 50 people.

== Education ==
The Grandfalls-Royalty Independent School District serves area students.

== Notable people ==
- Gary Cartwright (1934–2017), journalist
