= Monahans-Wickett-Pyote Independent School District =

School district in Texas

Monahans-Wickett-Pyote Independent School District is a public school district based in Monahans, Texas, United States.

In addition to Monahans, the district serves the towns of Wickett, Pyote, and Thorntonville.

In 2009, the school district was rated "academically acceptable" by the Texas Education Agency.

== Schools ==
- Monahans High School (grades 9-12) - The mascot is the lobo; the school newspaper is The Sandstorm, a reference to nearby Monahans Sandhills State Park, a unique geological feature and highly popular attraction.
- Walker Junior High (grades 7-8)
- Sudderth Elementary (grades 4-6)
- Tatom Elementary (grades 1-3)
- Cullender Kindergarten (prekindergarten and kindergarten)

== Accomplishments ==
The high school's football team (Monahans Lobos) last had a state championship in a 1948 victory over New Braunfels. They also made it to the 3A semifinals in 1998. In 2005, they returned to the 3A quarterfinals, but lost to the Sweetwater Mustangs.

The Big Green Band (Monahans High School's Band) was the runner-up in the 1998 3A UIL State Marching Contest, and later that year also won the 1998 3A UIL State Honor Band. The band recently went back to the state marching contest in 2004, and received its 40th first-division rating in 2005.

The high school's volleyball team (Monahans Lady Lobos) won the 3A State Championship in 2004 and returned to the finals in 2005, but lost to Bellville in the last game to qualify as the 2005 state runner-up. The team returned to the 3A State Championship in 2007, but came up short to Wimberley in five games, making it the 2007 3A State runner-up.

== Notable Monahans High School alumni ==
- Natalie Zea - television actress
