= Gene Cronin =

American football player (1933–2024)

- Cronin with Pacific in 1955

No. 68, 85
- Positions: Defensive end, linebacker, guard

Personal information
- Born: November 20, 1933; Spalding, Nebraska, U.S.
- Died: September 17, 2024 (aged 90); Sacramento, California, U.S.
- Listed height: 6 ft 2 in (1.88 m)
- Listed weight: 229 lb (104 kg)

Career information
- High school: C. K. McClatchy (Sacramento)
- College: Pacific (1953–1955)
- NFL draft: 1956: 7th round, 74th overall pick

Career history
- Detroit Lions (1956–1959); Dallas Cowboys (1960); Washington Redskins (1961–1962)

Awards and highlights
- NFL champion (1957)

Career NFL statistics
- Fumble recoveries: 6
- Interceptions: 1
- Sacks: 2
- Stats at Pro Football Reference

Eugene Edward Cronin (November 20, 1933 – September 17, 2024) was an American professional football player who was a defensive end in the National Football League (NFL) for the Detroit Lions, Washington Redskins, and Dallas Cowboys. He played college football for the Pacific Tigers.

== Early life ==
Cronin attended Ione High School in California. He transferred to C. K. McClatchy High School after his freshman season. He practiced football and basketball.

In 1952, he enrolled at Sacramento City College. In 1953, he transferred to the University of the Pacific. He played in the 1956 East–West Shrine Game.

In 1984, he was inducted into the Pacific Athletics Hall of Fame. In 2001, he was inducted into the Sacramento City College Hall of Fame.

== Professional career ==
=== Detroit Lions ===
Cronin was selected by the Detroit Lions in the seventh round (74th overall) of the 1956 NFL draft. He initially made the team as a pass rushing specialist. In 1957, he contributed to the team winning the NFL Championship.

=== Dallas Cowboys ===
Cronin was selected by the Dallas Cowboys in the 1960 NFL expansion draft. He became one of the first starters at outside linebacker in franchise history (the other was Wayne Hansen).

On July 30, 1961, he was traded to the Washington Redskins in exchange for a draft choice.

=== Washington Redskins ===
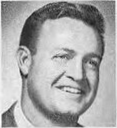
Cronin with the Atlanta Falcons in 1968.

Cronin played two seasons for the Washington Redskins. On August 26, 1963, he was placed on the injured reserve list with a back injury and was assigned scouting duties. He only missed one game in seven seasons in the league.

== Personal life and death ==
After he retired, he worked as the Detroit Lions' chief scout. In 1965, he became the first person hired by the newly formed Atlanta Falcons and served as the Director of player personnel. He was later promoted to assistant general manager, before resigning on November 15, 1968.

Cronin died on September 17, 2024, at the age of 90.
