= Norm Cox (gridiron football) =

American gridiron football player (1925–2008)

No. 65, 62
- Positions: Quarterback, tailback

Personal information
- Born: September 22, 1925; Stamford, Texas, U.S.
- Died: April 28, 2008 (aged 82); Monahans, Texas, U.S.
- Listed height: 6 ft 2 in (1.88 m)
- Listed weight: 210 lb (95 kg)

Career information
- High school: Grandfalls-Royalty (Grandfalls, Texas)
- College: Texas Christian
- NFL draft: 1948: 31st round, 291st overall pick

Career history
- Chicago Rockets (1946–1947); Montreal Alouettes (1948)

Awards and highlights
- First-team All-SWC (1944)
- Stats at Pro Football Reference

Norman Lawrence Cox (September 22, 1925 – April 28, 2008) was an American professional football quarterback who played two seasons with the Chicago Rockets of the All-America Football Conference (AAFC). He played college football at Texas Christian University. Cox was also a member of the Montreal Alouettes of the Interprovincial Rugby Football Union.

== Early life and college ==
Norman Lawrence Cox was born on September 22, 1925, in Stamford, Texas. He attended Grandfalls-Royalty High School in Grandfalls, Texas.

He played college football for the TCU Horned Frogs, lettering in 1944 and 1945. He earned Associated Press first-team All-SWC honors in 1944.

== Professional career ==
Cox signed with the Chicago Rockets of the All-America Football Conference (AAFC) in 1946. He played in three games for the Rockets during the AAFC's first season in 1946, rushing once for 12 yards. He appeared in two games in 1947, completing one of two passes for nine yards. In December 1947, Cox was selected by the Chicago Bears in the 31st round, with the 291st overall pick, of the 1948 NFL draft. He was released by the Rockets in 1948.

Cox played in 11 games, starting three, for the Montreal Alouettes of the Interprovincial Rugby Football Union in 1948.

== Personal life ==
Cox died on April 28, 2008, in Monahans, Texas.
