= Monahans High School =

Coordinates: 31.5866°N 102.8939°W

Location
- 809 S. Betty St. Monahans, Texas 79756-5099; United States

Information
- School type: Public high school
- School district: Monahans-Wickett-Pyote Independent School District
- Principal: Barry Clayton
- Staff: 45.43 (FTE)
- Grades: 9-12
- Enrollment: 626 (2023-2024)
- Student to teacher ratio: 13.78
- Colors: Green & White
- Athletics conference: UIL Class AAAA
- Mascot: Lobo/Lady Lobo
- Newspaper: The Sandstorm
- Yearbook: Lobo
- Website: Monahans High School

Monahans High School is a public high school located in Monahans, Texas, United States and classified as a 4A school by the University Interscholastic League (UIL). It is part of the Monahans-Wickett-Pyote Independent School District located in northeast Ward County. In 2017, the school was rated "Met Standard" by the Texas Education Agency.

== Athletics ==
The Monahans Loboes compete in the following sports -

Cross Country, Volleyball, Football, Basketball, Powerlifting, Swimming, Golf, Tennis, Track, Softball & Baseball

=== State Titles ===
- Football -
  - 1948(1A)
- Boys Golf -
  - 1970(2A), 1971(2A), 2018(4A), 2019(4A)
- Girls Golf -
  - 2009(3A), 2010(3A)
- Boys Track -
  - 1966(3A), 1973(3A)
- Volleyball -
  - 1969(3A), 1970(3A). 1974(3A), 1975(3A)^, 1975(3A)", 1979(3A), 1982(4A), 1984(4A), 2004(3A)

^ Spring

" Fall

==== State Finalist ====
- Volleyball -
  - 2003(3A), 2005(3A). 2007(3A), 2009(3A)

== Notable alumni ==
- Carter Casteel (Class of 1961) - former member of the Texas House of Representatives from Comal County
- Deanna Dunagan (Class of 1958) - Tony Award-winning actress
- Wayne Hansen - former NFL player
- Natalie Zea - television actress
