= Sierra Madera crater =

Impact crater in Texas, United States

Sierra Madera Crater
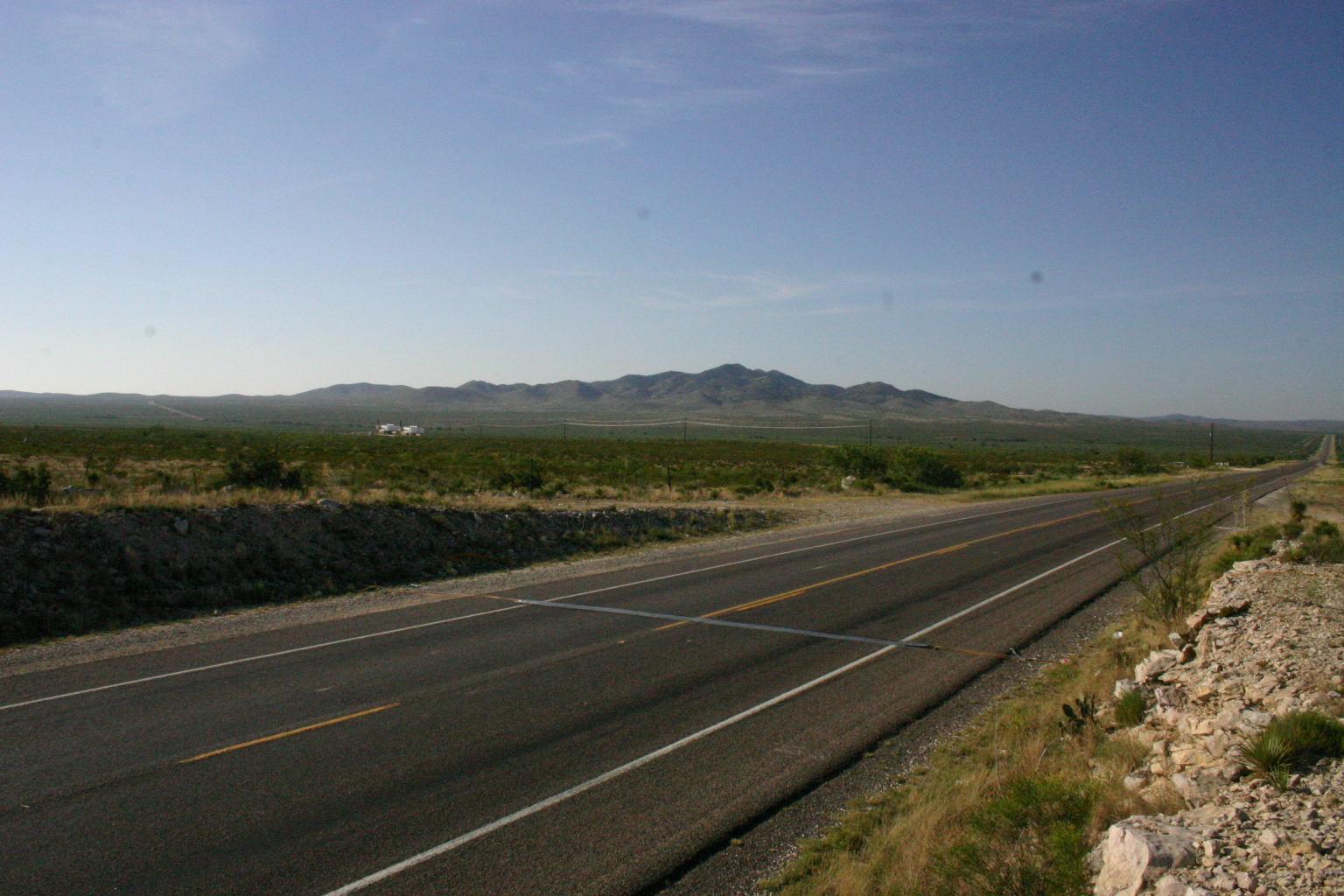
- Sierra Madera viewed from US Highway 385

- Location within Texas
- Location: Pecos County, West Texas, United States; 30°36′N 102°55′W

Impact crater structure
- Confidence: Confirmed
- Diameter: 8 mi (13 km)
- Age: ≲100 million years
- Exposed: Yes
- Drilled: Yes
- Topo map: Sierra Madera

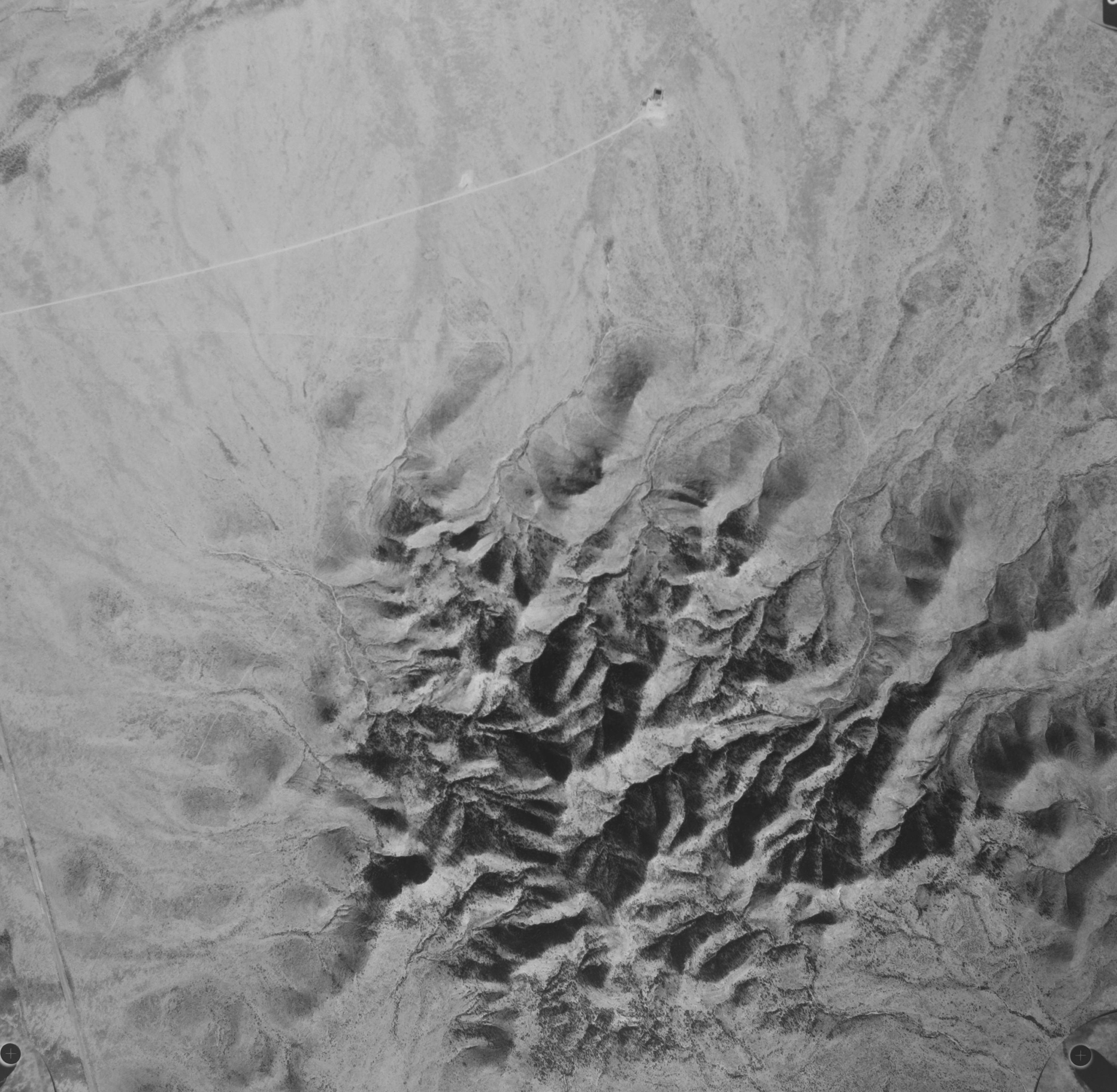
Air photo of central peak complex

The Sierra Madera crater is a complex impact crater (astrobleme) in southwestern Pecos County, Texas, United States. The impact structure spans approximately 8 mi (13 km) in diameter and is centered 20 mi (30 km) south of Fort Stockton, roughly equidistant from Mexico and New Mexico and near the northeastern end of the Glass Mountains. The central peak of the rebound structure of the impact crater rises 793 ft (242 m) above the surrounding land. The peak is visible from U.S. Highway 385 between Fort Stockton, Texas and Marathon, Texas. The Sierra Madera crater is located on private property on the La Escalera Ranch.

The crater is mostly eroded but remains well exposed. At the center of the crater are the hilly remains of the central peak produced by the impact. Known as Sierra Madera or Madera Mountain, the uplift rises 4,593 ft (1,400 m) above sea level. The peak occupies most of the crater and is its most prominent feature, spanning about 5 mi (8 km) across. Strongly folded and faulted carbonate and siliciclastic rock layers from the upper Paleozoic to Cretaceous comprise the central structure, along with breccia fragments spanning as much as several meters across. The oldest Permian rocks in the structure lie 3,900 ft (1,200 m) above their typical position. The strata folded in the central uplift provide an indication of the impact's age. An alluvium-filled depression up to 1 mi (1.6 km) wide surrounds the central uplift, outlined by an outer concentric crater rim about 0.5 mi (0.80 km) wide. The crater rim consists of low hills that climb subtly above the surrounding land.

The first geological map of the Sierra Madera was published in 1930. The central peak was initially interpreted as a cryptovolcanic structure. However, no igneous rocks were detected within 13,000 ft (4,000 m) of the surface. The discovery of shatter cones, impact breccias, and shocked quartz in the 1960s, along with supporting gravity and magnetic surveys, lent credence to interpreting the structure as having impact origins. The shock-related features identified in rock samples suggest the impact produced pressures of at least 3 to 20 GPa, with erosion masking the record of more intense pressures.

The impact that produced the Sierra Madera likely occurred sometime between the late Cretaceous and early Paleogene (within 100 million years ago) in an area with thick sediment about 3.4 mi (5.5 km) in depth. The impact site, at the southern edge of the Val Verde Basin, may have been underwater at the time of impact. The surrounding area now is largely flat or rolling shrubland and grassland with sand and caliche. The apparent 8 mi (13 km) diameter of the crater is based on the diameter of the concentric outer hills interpreted as a crater rim. However, studies in the 2000s suggest the structure may be larger than initially thought; one 2006 study estimated a 9.9 mi (16 km) diameter with significant erosion. The entire bowl-shaped impact structure extends to 6,000–8,000 ft (1,800–2,400 m) below the surface.

In the 1960s, the Sierra Madera crater was the subject of various studies conducted by the Astrogeology Research Program at USGS as part of the Apollo program, providing an analogous setting to lunar craters. Apollo 17's Gene Cernan and Jack Schmitt did some of their geological training here in March 1972.

== See also ==
- Odessa Meteor Crater
- Marquez crater
- Barringer Meteor Crater, Arizona
- Trans-Pecos
- Pecos River
- Llano Estacado
