= Pyote Air Force Base =

Former World War II US Army Air Forces training airbase

Pyote Air Force Base Pyote Air Force Station Pyote Army Air Field
- Ward County, near Pyote, Texas
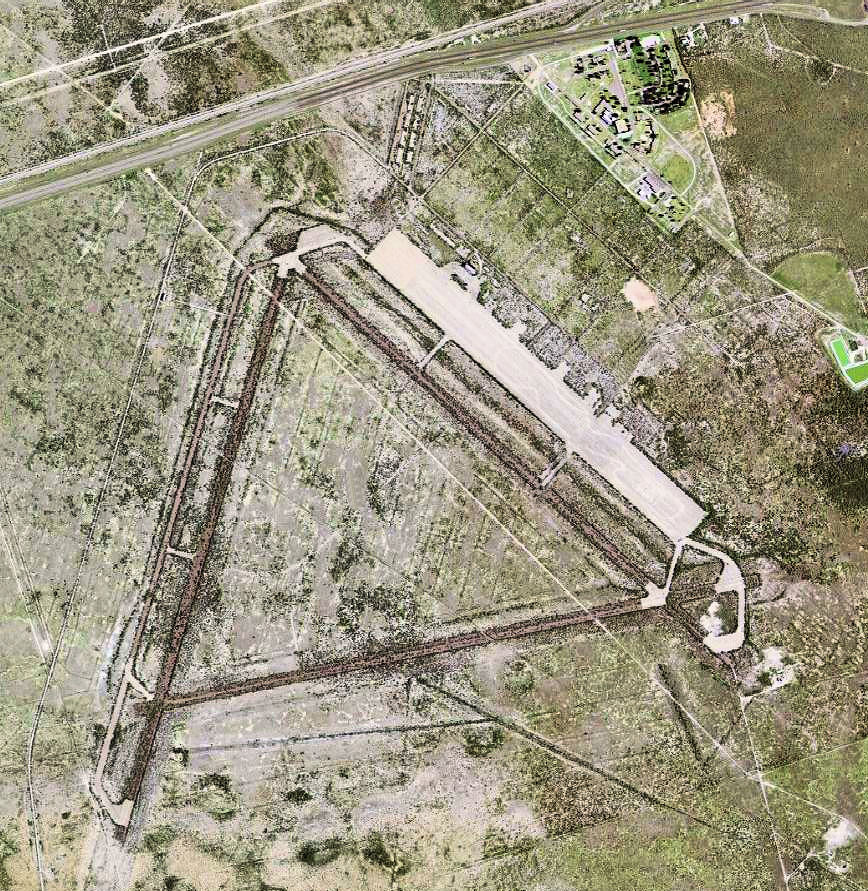
- 2006 USGS airphoto

Site information
- Type: Army Air Field; Air Force Base
- Code: ADC TM-186

Location
- Location within Texas
- Coordinates: 31°30′40.00″N 103°08′30.00″W

Site history
- Built: 1942
- In use: 1942-1954 (1966 Non Flying Use)

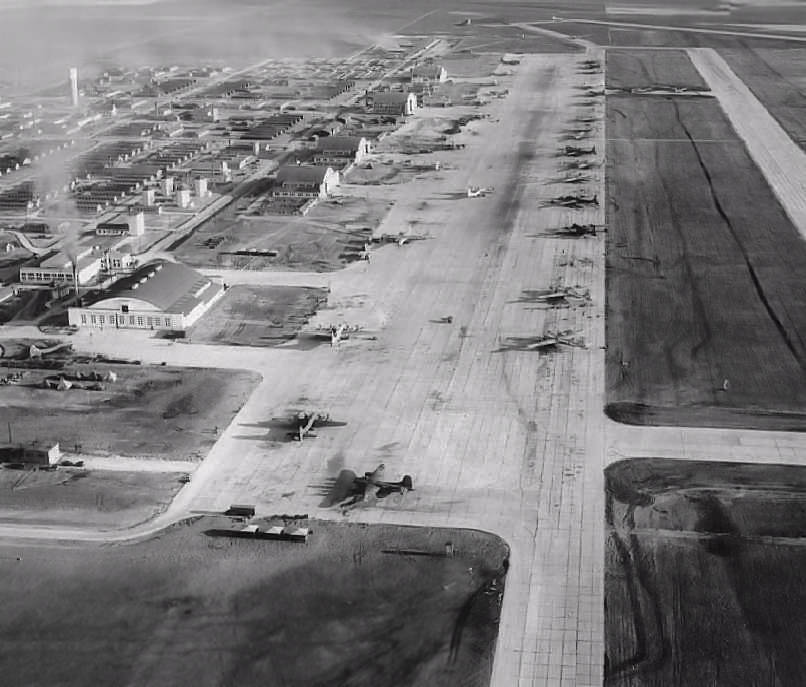
Flightline of Pyote AAF about 1944/45. Notice the mix of B-17 and B-29 aircraft. The walls of the large hangar in the lower left of the photo are the only standing structure left at Pyote today.

Pyote Air Force Base was a World War II United States Army Air Forces training airbase. It was on 2,745 acres (1,111 ha) a mile from the town of Pyote, Texas, near Interstate 20, 20 miles west of Monahans,` 230 miles (370 km) east of El Paso.

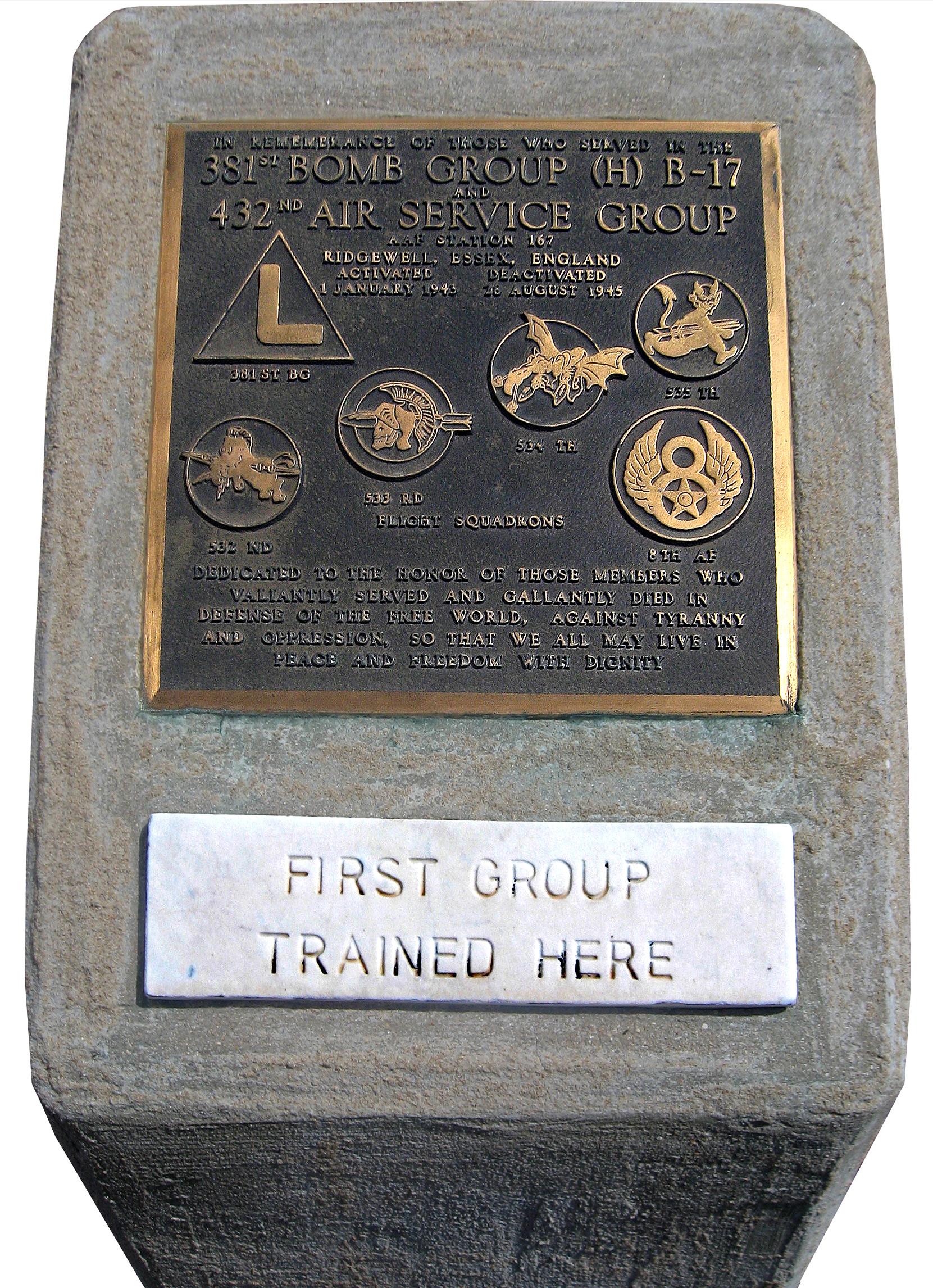
Tribute to the first squadrons who trained at Rattlesnake Bomber Base

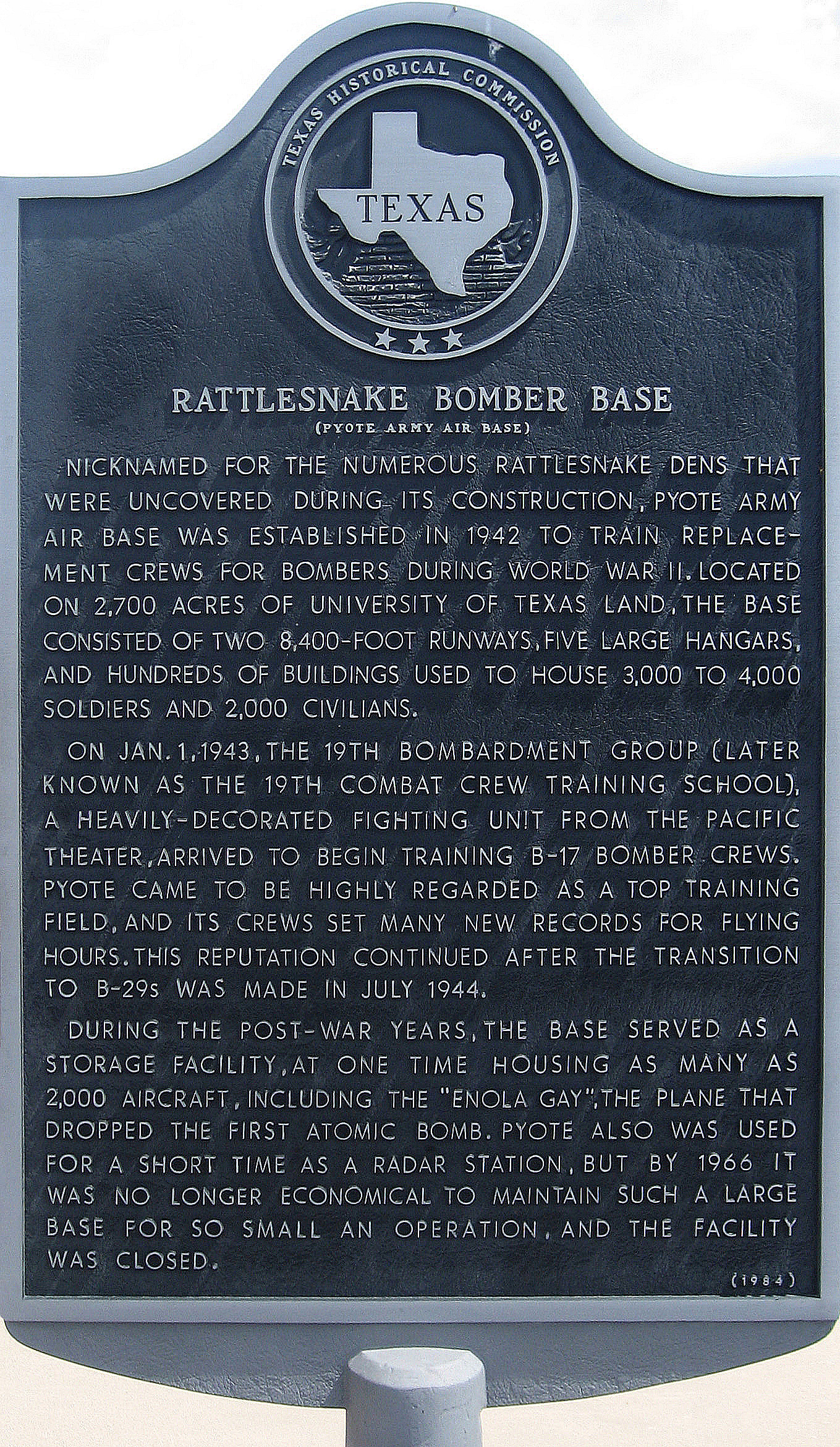
Texas Historical Marker

It was nicknamed "Rattlesnake Bomber Base" for the numerous rattlesnake dens that were uncovered during its construction.

At the height of its use in 1944, the base had over 6,000 officers and enlisted men, either permanently assigned or temporarily attached. In addition, hundreds of civilians came from all over the United States to work on the base.

After World War II, thousands of reserve aircraft were stored there, one of which was the B-29 Enola Gay.

Today, most of the base is gone. Other than the concrete runways, taxiways, and ramp, virtually nothing remains that would tell the casual observer that this was once a major training center responsible for turning out highly trained flying crews. In later years, the West Texas State School was situated on the site; it was closed in 2010. Located on I-20 at exit 66.

== Origins ==
Pyote Army Air Field was established as a B-17 Flying Fortress crew-training base during World War II. Initially, newly established bomber groups were trained at Pyote, then it was switched to training replacement aircrew members who were deployed to combat units overseas. Initially, Pyote Army Air Field was assigned to Second Air Force, then in April 1944, to USAAF Continental Air Forces training command. Two main runways, each about 8,000 ft long and 150 ft wide, and a taxiway formed a triangle pattern on the flat, arid land. Construction of the facilities, including five large hangars, shops, warehouses, and living quarters, began on 5 September 1942.

== World War II use ==
The first troops were assigned within a month, well before the base was completed. Troops and civilian technicians poured in, and the population of the base grew steadily to a peak of over 6,500 in October 1944.

Within four months of its opening, the base had become the largest bomber installation in the country. Despite morale problems caused by isolation and the shortage of off-base recreation and dependents' housing, Pyote achieved a distinguished record in molding inexperienced individuals into effective bomber crews.

After the arrival of the famed 19th Bombardment Group' on 1 January 1943, and the ceremonial inauguration of its training program on 5 January 1943, Pyote rapidly turned out crews proficient in hitting targets from the B-17 Flying Fortress until the summer of 1944, when it was switched to the B-29 Superfortress.

The 19th BG was the first air force unit to bomb Japanese targets. It flew to Pyote directly from combat in the Pacific. The base was redesignated the 19th Combat Crew Training School' late in 1943, and then replaced on 30 March 1944, by the 236th Army Air Forces Base Unit (Combat Crew Training School).

Known B-17 units trained at Pyote AAB were:

- 381st Bombardment Group (Heavy) 3 January - 5 April 1943
- 96th Bombardment Group (Heavy) January - March 1943

In June 1945, the base claimed records for the most B-29 training hours flown by any base in a single month (7,396), in a week (1,873), and in a day (321).

Known B-29 groups that trained at Pyote AAB were:

- 301st Bombardment Group (Very Heavy)
- 454th Bombardment Group (Very Heavy)

With the end of the war in the Pacific in August 1945, both of these groups were inactivated.

== Postwar use ==
=== Aircraft storage depot ===
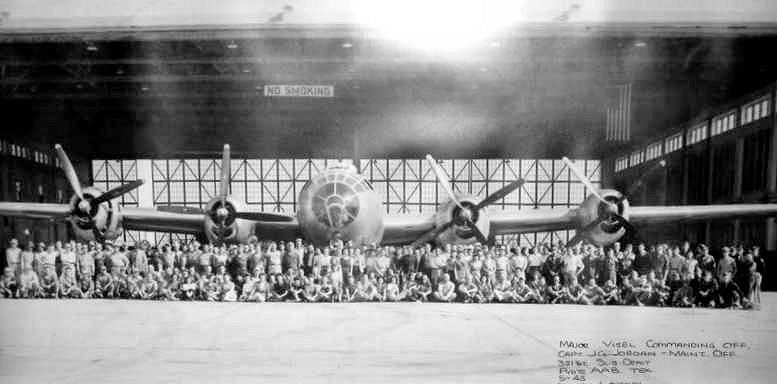
Personnel of the 351st Sub Depot in front of a B-29 at Pyote Army Air Field

Control of Pyote was transferred from the Fourth Air Force to the Air Technical Service Command / San Antonio Air Technical Service Command on 15 November 1945, at the end of the war. The base became an aircraft storage depot. During the postwar years, the temporary tar-paper and wooden buildings were largely sold off, with the personnel using more substantial concrete structures for their duties along with the hangars and support buildings by the flightline ramp.

At its peak in 1948, Pyote Air Force Base' was maintained by the 4141st Army Air Forces (later Air Force) Base Unit, and housed 2,042 stored planes, mostly B-29s and B-17s, but including B-25s, A-26s, C-47s, P-63s, P-51s, AT-7s, L-5s, and L-4s.

Aircraft storage and the cocooning of some of these planes was the last major activity at Pyote Air Field, which was the responsibility of the 2753d Aircraft Storage Squadron. Storage included not only preserving planes for future use, but also transferring some of the stored planes to other Air Force units for their use.

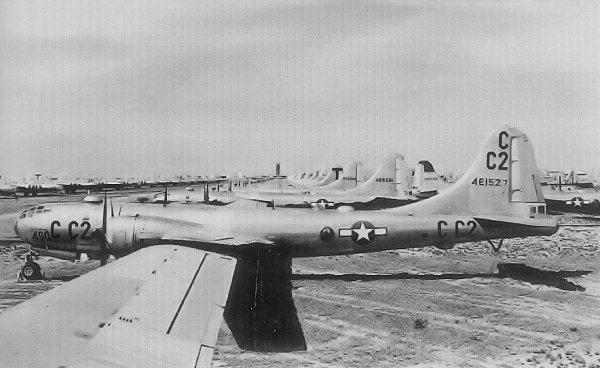
B-29 Superfortresses stored at Pyote AAF during the late 1940s: Boeing B-29A-35-BN Superfortress AAF Ser. No. 44-61527 is in the foreground.

Corrosion control crews removed, cleaned, and treated the turrets in all of the B-29s. The aircraft were "cocooned" to seal out the elements from the interior, and the aircraft were kept in flyable reserve storage.

Best known of all the aircraft stored at Pyote was the B-29 Enola Gay, from which the first atomic bomb was dropped on Hiroshima. Arriving at Pyote on 12 January 1952, the ownership of the aircraft was transferred to the Smithsonian Institution. The Enola Gay was taken out of storage and flown to Andrews Air Force Base, Maryland, on 2 December 1953, for preservation at the National Air and Space Museum. It was the last time she flew. Two other notable aircraft put in storage at Pyote were the B-17D Swoose (arrived 18 January 1952 - departed December 1953), which was the only B-17 to survive the bombing of Clark Air Base on 8 December 1941 and manage to escape from the Philippines, and the XB-42 Mixmaster, a one-of-a-kind aircraft.

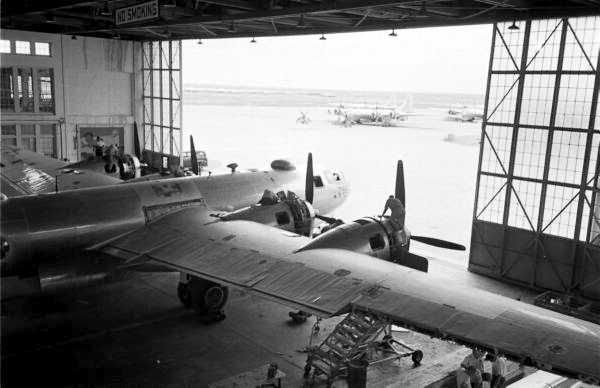
Pyote AFB B-29 Superfortress refurbishment 1950: Note the B-29s on the ramp awaiting restoration or flyout.

Beginning in 1950, the demands for B-29s to be used in the Korean War meant that nearly 100 of the aircraft stored at Pyote were refurbished and sent to active-duty units on Okinawa for use in combat, while some stored B-29s were authorized to be used for cannibalization to furnish spare parts to operational aircraft. Many of the B-29s stored at Pyote were flown by the men of the 19th Bomb Group, the same group that was the first to serve at Pyote in 1943. Air battles between the B-29s and Soviet MiG-15s, in the skies of North Korea made it clear that the age of the jet had arrived, which made most of the propeller-driven combat aircraft stored at Pyote obsolete.

After the 1953 armistice in Korea, the Air Force ordered most of the remaining planes at Pyote to be scrapped, and activity on the base was sharply curtailed. Its mission became the reclamation and salvage of the stored aircraft. The B-29s stored at the base were very important, as the reclamation process consisted of removing all serviceable and reparable items to support the operational B-29s still in service. A smelter was installed on the base and as the aircraft were disassembled and parts removed, the remnants were recycled with the metal sold for scrap.

The last base commander, Lt. Col. Max A. Piper, was notified that the base was scheduled for deactivation on 31 December 1953, and the base went on standby status, leaving only a 27-man caretaker crew to maintain the facility. The last plane left Pyote AFB sometime in 1955, along with the standby crew. At that time, most of the permanent buildings and hangars remained, although abandoned.

=== Air Defense Radar Station ===
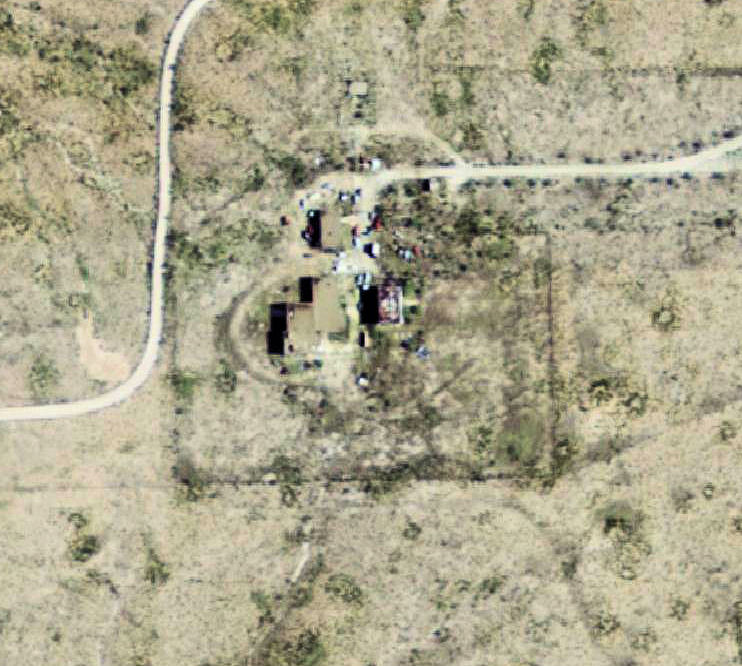
A 2006 photo of Air Defense Command Radar Site TM-186, Pyote Air Force Station, closed and abandoned in 1963

In April 1958, the base was reopened as Pyote Air Force Station (TM-186), a radar installation acting as one link in a chain of installations that were part of an early-warning network in case of Soviet air attack during the Cold War. The 697th Aircraft Control and Warning Squadron, an Air Defense Command 34th Air Division unit, operated a radar site about 3.6 miles (5.8 km) southwest of the main containment area 31°28′46″N 103°11′26″W. The 697th ACWS operated a Bendix AN/FPS-3 search radar with a range around 200 miles; it also operated a General Electric AN/FPS-6 height-finder radar with a range around 300 miles. The station functioned as a ground-control intercept and warning station. As such, the squadron's role was to guide interceptor aircraft toward unidentified intruders picked up on the unit's radar scopes.

In addition to the radar station, the Air Force built base housing and several support buildings. The NW/SE runway was also activated and used to fly crews in and out of the base and for logistical support.

In March 1963, the Air Force ordered the site to close. Operations at Pyote ceased on 1 August 1963. With the ADC facility closed, Pyote AFB was declared surplus, and turned over to the General Services Administration (GSA) for disposal.

== Current status ==
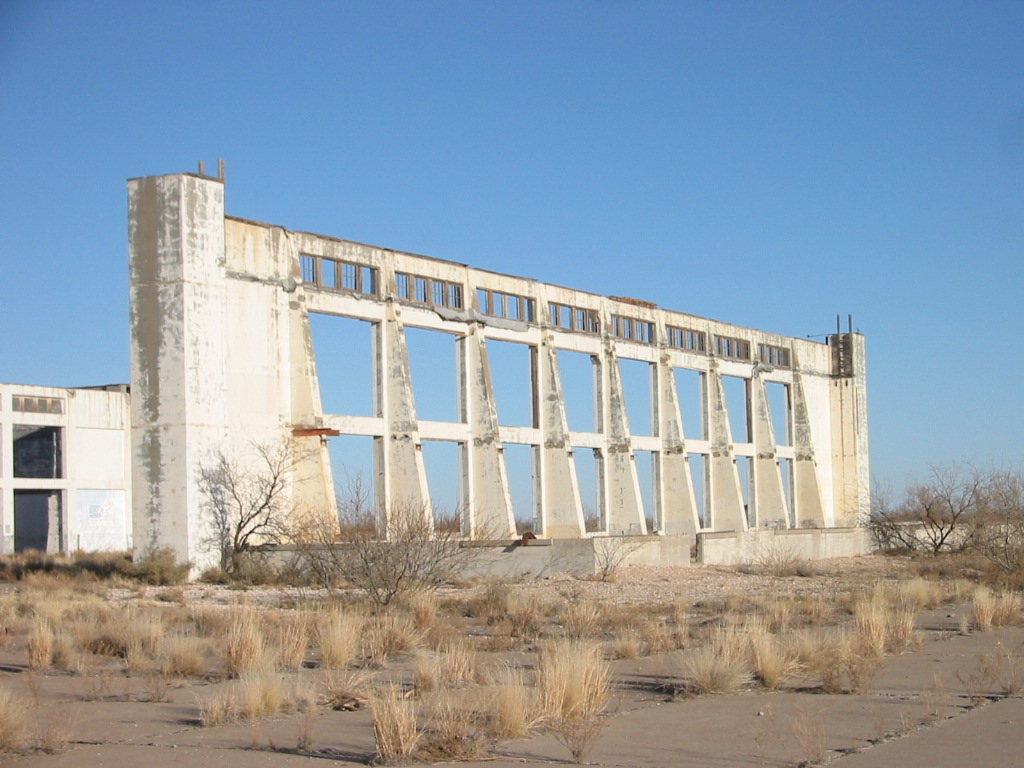
Remains of a World War II-era hangar at Pyote AAF, taken 2002

Following the deactivation of the site in 1963, the facilities were disposed of by the GSA. The Air Defense Command support buildings along with the base family housing were provided to the West Texas Children's Home, and the land and remaining buildings were turned over to the University of Texas at Austin. The Confederate Air Force used the runway and some of the remaining buildings on the flightline in the early 1960s, but the remoteness of the base led to it being closed by 1965 as uneconomical. The last of the original World War II support buildings on the base were gone by 1977.

Six huge hangars once fronted the concrete ramp. Five are visible in an aerial photo dated 1977. At some point after 1980, four of the hangars were apparently removed or destroyed. At least one of them was evidently intentionally destroyed in 1979 in the course of filming the movie Hangar 18 (1980). By 1985, a single large hangar (the former 3d Echelon Maintenance Hangar) remained and slowly deteriorating runways and taxiways were all that marked the once-busy bomber base. At some point between 1989 and '96, the roof and most of the walls of the former 3d Echelon Maintenance Hangar were removed, leaving only a hollow grid of the side walls of the hangar standing.

The west side of the former AAF/AFB, where the actual airfield was, is deserted. Runways and taxiways, hardstands, and the flightline apron exist with tall weeds and other sparse vegetation slowly taking over the concrete areas. The Air Defense Command radar site southeast of the base is abandoned and full of junk vehicles; the buildings on it are still standing in a deteriorated state.

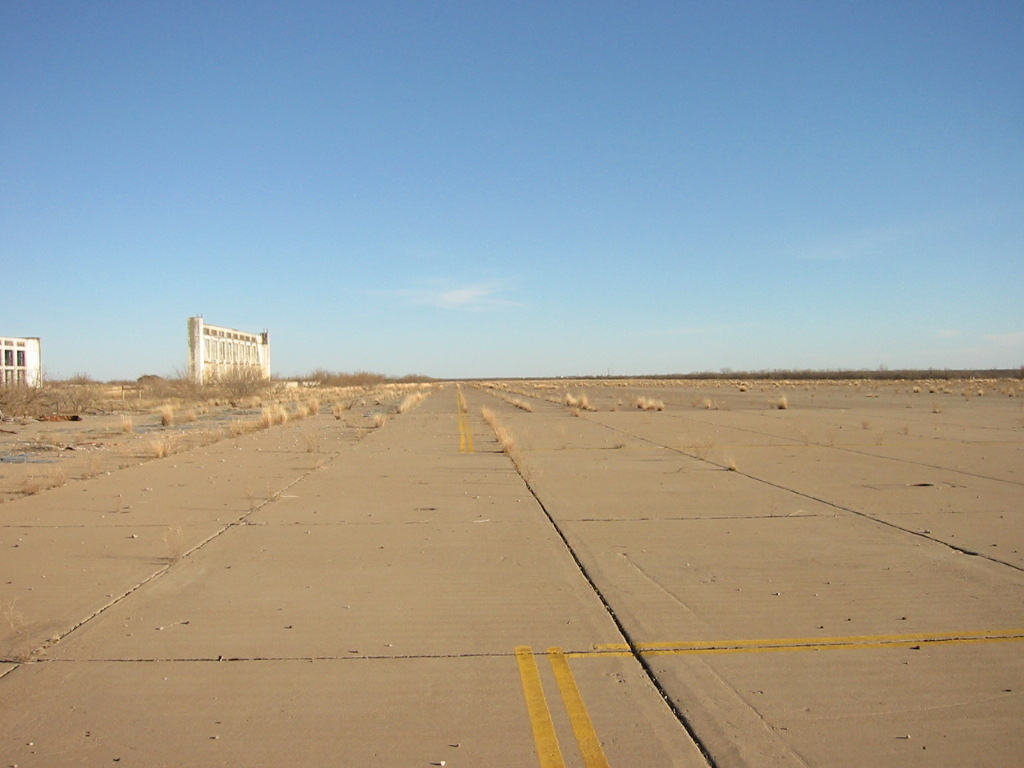
Former parking apron at Pyote AAF, taken 2002

The property was being used by the Texas Youth Commission's West Texas State School. The former AFB family housing (small, individual units) was used by the prison staff. The state school closed in 2010.

The original entrance has been refurbished, and today stands as a memorial to the men and women who worked and trained here, many of whom gave their lives while learning to effectively use the B-17 and B-29.

In the town of Pyote, about 15 miles west of Monahans, a museum honors the memory of the men and women who served there. Pyote Army Air Field played an important role in the local community during World War II. Base personnel had a long-lasting social relationship with the local citizens, and the base itself created jobs and great economic prosperity for the community. Pyote was quite literally transformed by the base.

== See also ==
- Texas World War II Army Airfields
- List of USAF Aerospace Defense Command General Surveillance Radar Stations

== Bibliography ==
- Baugher, Joe. USAAS-USAAC-USAAF-USAF Aircraft Serial Numbers--1908 to Present
- Maurer, Maurer (1983). Air Force Combat Units Of World War II. Maxwell AFB, Alabama: Office of Air Force History. ISBN 0-89201-092-4.
- Thole, Lou (1999), Forgotten Fields of America : World War II Bases and Training, Then and Now - Vol. 2. Publisher:
