= Marquez crater =

Impact crater in east Texas

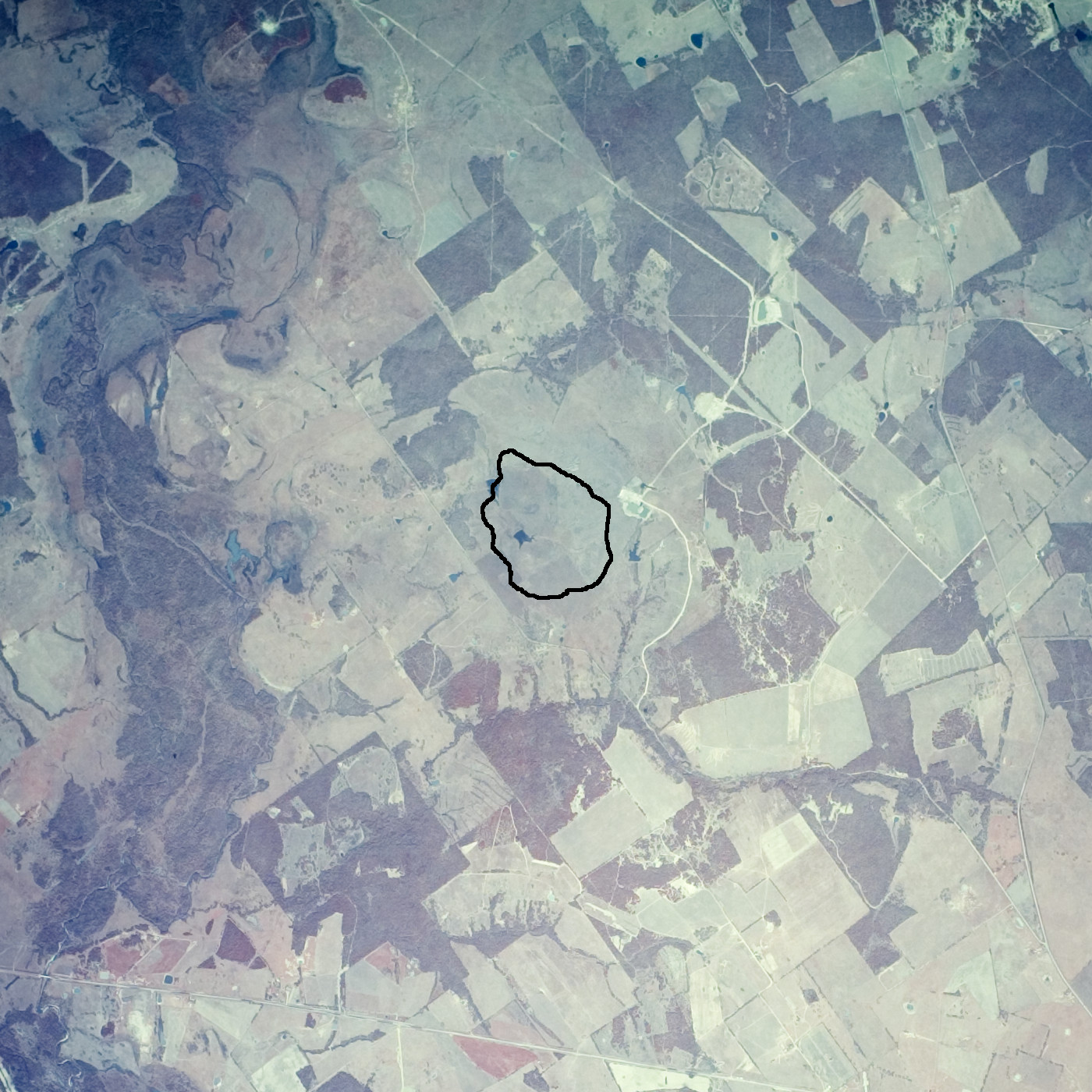
- Cretaceous rocks at center of Marquez dome

- Location within Texas
- Location: Marquez, Texas, United States, Leon County, TX, Texas, US-TX, United States; 31°17′N 96°18′W

Impact crater structure
- Diameter: 12.7 km (8 mi)
- Age: 58 ± 2 million years
- Exposed: No
- Drilled: Yes
- Access: State Highway 7

Marquez crater is a meteorite crater located in Leon County, Texas near the small town of Marquez about 177 km (110 mi) northeast of Austin, Texas, United States.

It is 12.7 km (8 mi) in diameter and the age is estimated to be 58 ± 2 million years (Paleocene). The crater is not exposed at the surface, but some surface formations including the Marquez Dome are thought to be exposed portions of the rebound peak. This includes a circular region of disturbed Cretaceous sedimentary rocks roughly 1.2 km (0.75 mi) in diameter at the surface. This may be associated with a central peak rising at least 1,120 m (3,670 ft) above the base of the buried crater. The uplift was initially thought to indicate an underlying salt dome by early investigators, but this origin was ruled out by reflection seismology and the discovery of features like shatter cones strongly associated with meteoric origin.

== See also ==
- Odessa Meteor Crater
- Sierra Madera crater
