= Thorntonville, Texas =

Town in Ward County, Texas, United States

- Town
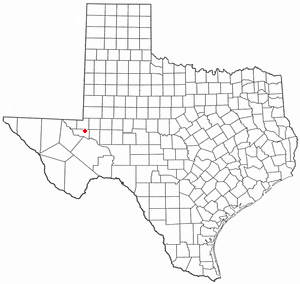
- Location of Thorntonville, Texas

- Coordinates: 31°34′47″N 102°55′25″W
- Country: United States
- State: Texas
- County: Ward

Area
  - Total: 0.80 sq mi (2.07 km^{2})
  - Land: 0.80 sq mi (2.07 km^{2})
  - Water: 0 sq mi (0.00 km^{2})
- Elevation: 2,605 ft (794 m)

Population (2020)
  - Total: 561
  - Density: 702/sq mi (271/km^{2})
- Time zone: UTC-6 (Central (CST))
  - Summer (DST): UTC-5 (CDT)
- FIPS code: 48-72800
- GNIS feature ID: 1369870

Thorntonville is a town in Ward County, Texas, United States. The population was 561 according to the 2020 census.

== Geography ==
Thorntonville is located at 31°34′47″N 102°55′25″W (31.579803, –102.923722).

According to the United States Census Bureau, the town has a total area of 0.8 square mile (2.0 km^{2}), all land.

=== Climate ===
According to the Köppen Climate Classification system, Thorntonville has a semi-arid climate, abbreviated "BSk" on climate maps.

== Demographics ==
Historical population
Census	Pop.	Note	%±
1970	629		—
1980	717		14.0%
1990	693		−3.3%
2000	442		−36.2%
2010	476		7.7%
2020	561		17.9%
U.S. Decennial Census; 2020 Census

As of the census of 2000, there were 442 people, 187 households, and 137 families residing in the town. The population density was 564.7 inhabitants per square mile (218.0/km^{2}). There were 220 housing units at an average density of 281.1 per square mile (108.5/km^{2}). The racial makeup of the town was 85.97% White, 0.23% African American, 0.45% Native American, 0.23% Asian, 9.73% from other races, and 3.39% from two or more races. Hispanic or Latino of any race were 31.22% of the population.

There were 187 households, out of which 24.1% had children under the age of 18 living with them, 62.0% were married couples living together, 8.0% had a female householder with no husband present, and 26.7% were non-families. 23.5% of all households were made up of individuals, and 16.6% had someone living alone who was 65 years of age or older. The average household size was 2.36 and the average family size was 2.77.

In the town, the population was spread out, with 20.4% under the age of 18, 6.8% from 18 to 24, 21.9% from 25 to 44, 31.2% from 45 to 64, and 19.7% who were 65 years of age or older. The median age was 46 years. For every 100 females, there were 90.5 males. For every 100 females age 18 and over, there were 93.4 males.

The median income for a household in the town was $30,938, and the median income for a family was $40,078. Males had a median income of $30,156 versus $13,750 for females. The per capita income for the town was $17,210. About 10.2% of families and 14.8% of the population were below the poverty line, including 22.2% of those under age 18 and 11.6% of those age 65 or over.

== Education ==
The Town of Thorntonville is served by the Monahans-Wickett-Pyote Independent School District.

== See also ==
- List of municipalities in Texas
