= Joe Christie =

American politician (born 1933)

Member of the Texas Senate from the 29th district
- In office January 10, 1967 – January 9, 1973
- Preceded by: W. E. 'Pete' Snelson
- Succeeded by: H. Tati Santiesteban

Personal details
- Born: June 6, 1933 (age 93) Rising Star, Texas, U.S.
- Party: Democratic
- Education: University of Texas School of Law

Joe William Christie (born June 6, 1933) is an American politician. He served as a Democratic member for the 29th district of the Texas Senate.

== Life and career ==
Christie was born in Rising Star, Texas. He attended the University of Texas School of Law.

Christie was an assistant county attorney.

Christie served in the Texas Senate from 1967 to 1973, representing the 29th district.
