= Grandfalls, Texas =

Town in Ward County, Texas, United States

- Town
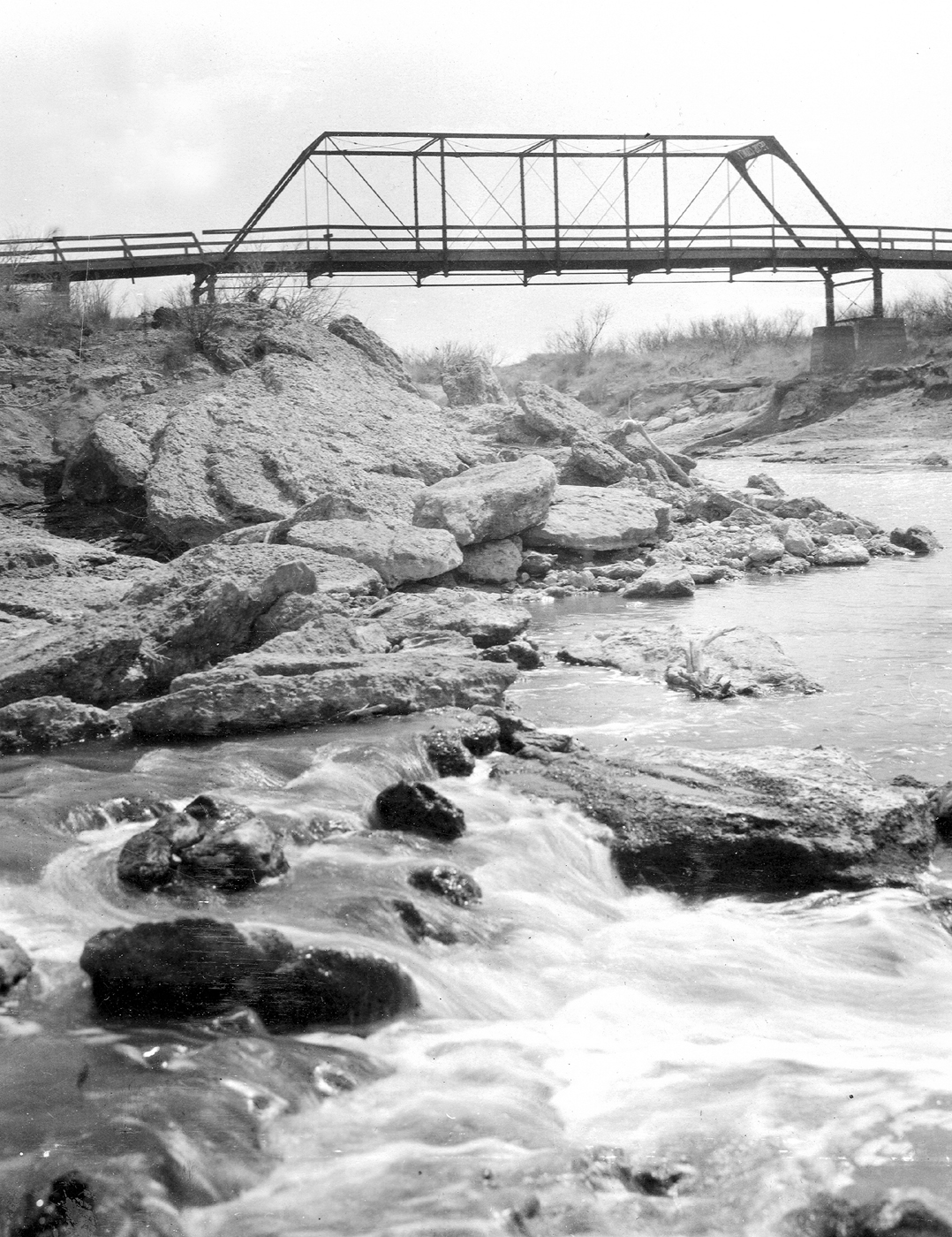
- Bridge across Pecos River near Grandfalls in 1910

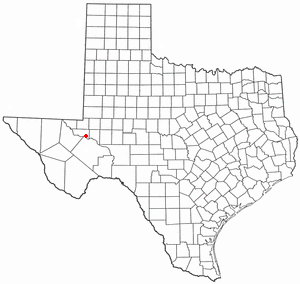
- Location of Grandfalls, Texas

- Coordinates: 31°20′27″N 102°51′17″W
- Country: United States
- State: Texas
- County: Ward

Area
  - Total: 0.54 sq mi (1.40 km^{2})
  - Land: 0.54 sq mi (1.40 km^{2})
  - Water: 0 sq mi (0.00 km^{2})
- Elevation: 2,434 ft (742 m)

Population (2020)
  - Total: 340
  - Density: 630/sq mi (240/km^{2})
- Time zone: UTC-6 (Central (CST))
  - Summer (DST): UTC-5 (CDT)
- ZIP code: 79742
- Area code: 432
- FIPS code: 48-30440
- GNIS feature ID: 1358254

Grandfalls is a town in Ward County, Texas, United States. It was named for its location near the "grand falls" of the Pecos River, located roughly 3 miles (4.8 km) to the west. Early settlers were attracted to the Grandfalls area in the late 1880s by the steady supply of water flowing in the Pecos River. Its population was 340 at the 2020 census.

== Geography ==
Grandfalls is located at 31°20′27″N 102°51′17″W (31.340779, –102.854785).

According to the United States Census Bureau, the town has a total area of 0.5 square mile (1.4 km^{2}), all land.

== Demographics ==
Historical population
Census	Pop.	Note	%±
1940	653		—
1950	995		52.4%
1960	1,012		1.7%
1970	622		−38.5%
1980	635		2.1%
1990	583		−8.2%
2000	391		−32.9%
2010	360		−7.9%
2020	340		−5.6%
U.S. Decennial Census

=== 2020 census ===
Grandfalls racial composition (NH = Non-Hispanic) (Note: Note: the US Census treats Hispanic/Latino as an ethnic category. This table excludes Latinos from the racial categories and assigns them to a separate category. Hispanics/Latinos can be of any race.)
Race	Number	Percentage
White (NH)	128	37.65%
Black or African American (NH)	9	2.65%
Mixed/Multi-Racial (NH)	9	2.65%
Hispanic or Latino	194	57.06%
Total	340	

As of the 2020 United States census, there were 340 people, 129 households, and 99 families residing in the town.

=== 2000 census ===
As of the census of 2000, 391 people, 146 households, and 100 families resided in the town. The population density was 729.1 inhabitants per square mile (281.5/km^{2}). The 203 housing units averaged 378.5 per square mile (145.1/km^{2}). The racial makeup of the town was 71.10% White, 0.26% African American, 1.28% Native American, 25.32% from other races, and 2.05% from two or more races. Hispanics or Latinos of any race were 49.87% of the population.

Of the 146 households, 43.2% had children under the age of 18 living with them, 51.4% were married couples living together, 13.0% had a female householder with no husband present, and 31.5% were not families. About 29.5% of all households were made up of individuals, and 14.4% had someone living alone who was 65 years of age or older. The average household size was 2.68 and the average family size was 3.34.

In the town, the population was distributed as 33.2% under the age of 18, 7.2% from 18 to 24, 26.6% from 25 to 44, 18.9% from 45 to 64, and 14.1% who were 65 years of age or older. The median age was 34 years. For every 100 females, there were 81.9 males. For every 100 females age 18 and over, there were 69.5 males.

The median income for a household in the town was $19,583, and for a family was $27,250. Males had a median income of $27,000 versus $12,188 for females. The per capita income for the town was $10,524. About 24.1% of families and 24.1% of the population were below the poverty line, including 28.3% of those under age 18 and 28.1% of those age 65 or over.

== Education and sports ==
The town of Grandfalls is served by the Grandfalls-Royalty Independent School District. In 2013, the Grandfalls-Royalty Cowboys won the U.I.L. 1A Division 2 six-man football state championship.

== Climate ==
This area has a large amount of sunshine year round due to its stable descending air and high pressure. According to the Köppen climate classification system, Grandfalls has a desert climate, Bwh on climate maps.

== Notable people ==
- Norman Lawrence Cox (1925–2008), was an American football quarterback who played two seasons with the Chicago Rockets of the All-America Football Conference; he attended Grandfalls-Royalty High School
- W. E. "Pete" Snelson, journalist turned businessman and member of both houses of the Texas State Legislature, was born in Grandfalls in 1923

== See also ==
- List of municipalities in Texas
