= Ward County, Texas =

County in Texas, United States

- County
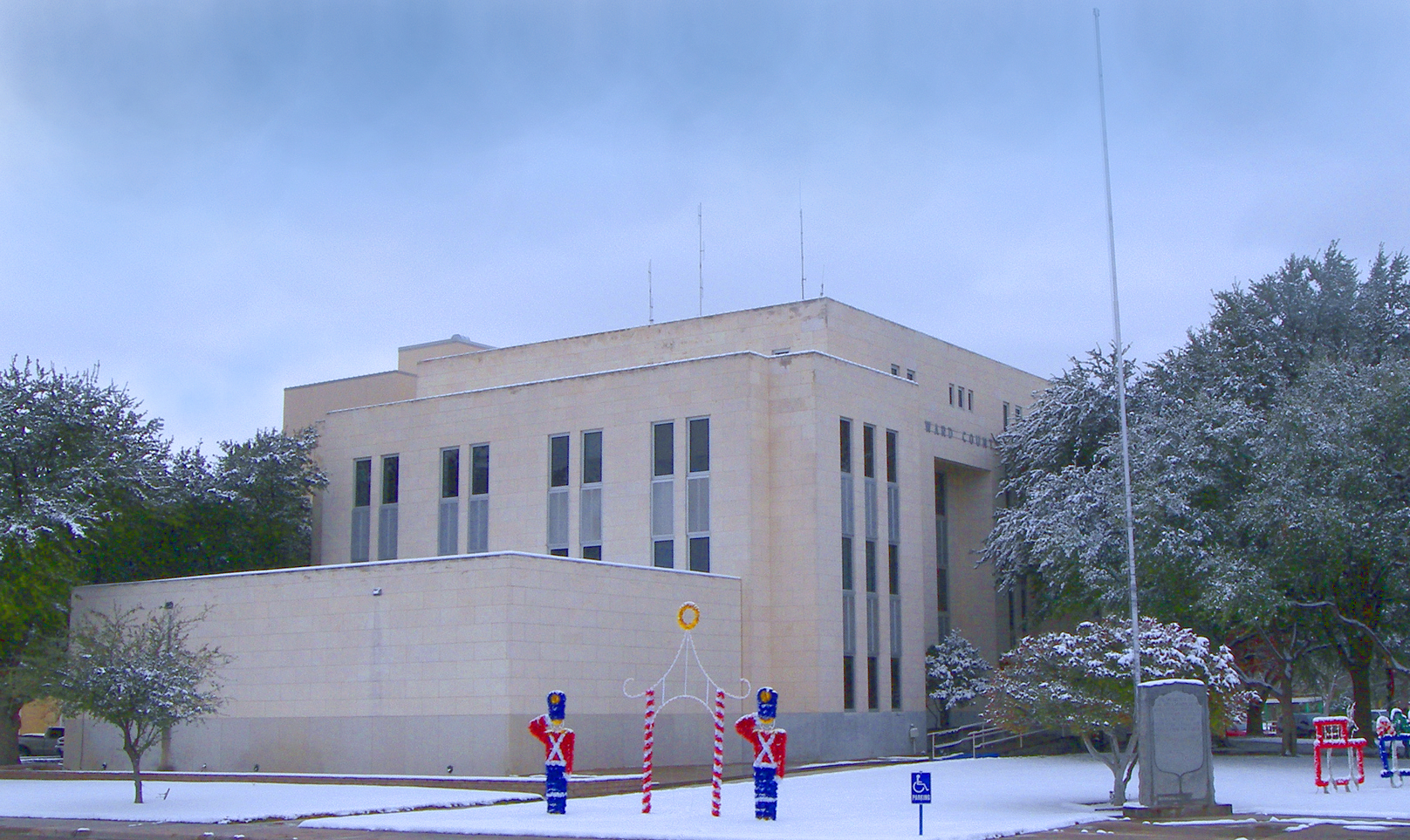
- The Ward County Courthouse in Monahans

- Flag

- Location within the U.S. state of Texas
- Coordinates: 31°31′N 103°06′W
- Country: United States
- State: Texas
- Founded: 1892
- Named for: Thomas W. Ward
- Seat: Monahans
- Largest city: Monahans

Area
  - Total: 836 sq mi (2,170 km^{2})
  - Land: 836 sq mi (2,170 km^{2})
  - Water: 0.2 sq mi (0.52 km^{2}) 0.03%

Population (2020)
  - Total: 11,644
  - Estimate (2025): 11,125 ▼
  - Density: 13.9/sq mi (5.38/km^{2})
- Time zone: UTC−6 (Central)
  - Summer (DST): UTC−5 (CDT)
- Congressional district: 23rd
- Website: www.co.ward.tx.us

Ward County is a county located in the U.S. state of Texas. As of the 2020 census, its population was 11,644. The county seat is Monahans. The county was created in 1887 and organized in 1892. It is named for Thomas W. Ward, a soldier in the Texas Revolution.

== History ==
=== Native Americans ===
Archeological investigations conducted in northwestern Ward County have found evidence of prehistoric man in the form of occupational debris, petroglyphs, and pictographs. Tribes occupying the area include Suma-Jumano, Apache, and Comanche. The sand hills have contained native artifacts.

=== Growth ===
The Butterfield Overland Mail in 1858 used Emigrant's Crossing, where exposed rocks afford one of the few places safe for fording the Pecos River. The stage line had an adobe station and a high-walled adobe corral there.

In 1881, the Texas and Pacific Railway crossed the region and established stations at Sand Hills, Monahans, Aroya, Pyote, Quito, Quito Quarry, and Barstow.

The Texas State Legislature carved Ward County from a portion of Tom Green County in 1887. The county was organized in 1892. Barstow became the county seat. Barstow became a farming and ranching trade center by 1904. Drought plagued the area in the early part of the 20th century.

Ward County benefitted from the opening of the Hendrick oilfield Winkler County in 1926. Pipelines and railroad loading tanks were constructed at Wickett, Pyote, and Monahans. Oil was discovered at Grandfalls in 1929, and the nearby community of Royalty was established. Shell Oil Company constructed an 8-acre (32,000 m^{2}) tank that would hold a million barrels. By January 1, 1991, 668,715,000 barrels (106,317,200 m^{3}) of oil had been produced in the county since 1928.

On May 10, 1938, Monahans won a contested election to move the county seat from Barstow. The election was upheld in 1939, and the county seat moved to Monahans that year.

Pyote Air Force Station opened in 1942, becoming the largest bomber installation in the United States. The plane Enola Gay, which dropped the atomic bomb on Hiroshima, was later stored here. The base became inactive during the Korean War.

Monahans Sandhills State Park opened in 1957. The Sealy-Smith Foundation leased much of the land to the state in 1956 until 2056. An additional 900 acres (3.6 km^{2}) were leased from the Williams family of Monahans.

== Geography ==
According to the U.S. Census Bureau, the county has a total area of 836 square miles (2,170 km^{2}), of which all but 0.2 sq mi (0.52 km^{2}) (0.03% or about 125 ac) are land.

=== Major highways ===
- Interstate 20
  - I-20 BL (Pecos)
  - I-20 BL (Monahans)
- State Highway 18
- State Highway 115
- State Highway 329
- Loop 464
- Spur 57
- Spur 65
- Spur 247

=== Adjacent counties ===
- Winkler County (north)
- Ector County (northeast)
- Crane County (east)
- Pecos County (south)
- Reeves County (west)
- Loving County (northwest)

== Demographics ==
Historical population
Census	Pop.	Note	%±
1890	77		—
1900	1,451		1,784.4%
1910	2,389		64.6%
1920	2,615		9.5%
1930	4,599		75.9%
1940	9,575		108.2%
1950	13,346		39.4%
1960	14,917		11.8%
1970	13,019		−12.7%
1980	13,976		7.4%
1990	13,115		−6.2%
2000	10,909		−16.8%
2010	10,658		−2.3%
2020	11,644		9.3%
2025 (est.)	11,125	▼	−4.5%
U.S. Decennial Census; 1850–2010 2010 2020

=== Racial and ethnic composition ===
Ward County, Texas – Racial and ethnic composition Note: the US Census treats Hispanic/Latino as an ethnic category. This table excludes Latinos from the racial categories and assigns them to a separate category. Hispanics/Latinos may be of any race.
Race / Ethnicity (NH = Non-Hispanic)	Pop 1980	Pop 1990	Pop 2000	Pop 2010	Pop 2020	% 1980	% 1990	% 2000	% 2010	% 2020
White alone (NH)	9,725	7,728	5,695	4,922	4,506	69.58%	58.92%	52.20%	46.18%	38.70%
Black or African American alone (NH)	436	432	476	474	415	3.12%	3.29%	4.36%	4.45%	3.56%
Native American or Alaska Native alone (NH)	45	64	48	48	41	0.32%	0.49%	0.44%	0.45%	0.35%
Asian alone (NH)	8	20	31	31	69	0.06%	0.15%	0.28%	0.29%	0.59%
Native Hawaiian or Pacific Islander alone (NH)	x	x	3	0	2	x	x	0.03%	0.00%	0.02%
Other race alone (NH)	11	41	3	9	22	0.08%	0.31%	0.03%	0.08%	0.19%
Mixed race or Multiracial (NH)	x	x	73	100	264	x	x	0.67%	0.94%	2.27%
Hispanic or Latino (any race)	3,751	4,830	4,580	5,074	6,325	26.84%	36.83%	41.98%	47.61%	54.32%
Total	13,976	13,115	10,909	10,658	11,644	100.00%	100.00%	100.00%	100.00%	100.00%

=== 2020 census ===
As of the 2020 census, the county had a population of 11,644. The median age was 35.7 years. 27.1% of residents were under the age of 18 and 13.9% of residents were 65 years of age or older. For every 100 females there were 103.6 males, and for every 100 females age 18 and over there were 102.9 males.

The racial makeup of the county was 56.4% White, 4.1% Black or African American, 1.0% American Indian and Alaska Native, 0.6% Asian, <0.1% Native Hawaiian and Pacific Islander, 18.0% from some other race, and 19.8% from two or more races. Hispanic or Latino residents of any race comprised 54.3% of the population.

78.7% of residents lived in urban areas, while 21.3% lived in rural areas.

There were 4,221 households in the county, of which 37.3% had children under the age of 18 living in them. Of all households, 50.5% were married-couple households, 20.6% were households with a male householder and no spouse or partner present, and 24.6% were households with a female householder and no spouse or partner present. About 24.9% of all households were made up of individuals and 9.8% had someone living alone who was 65 years of age or older.

There were 5,139 housing units, of which 17.9% were vacant. Among occupied housing units, 73.7% were owner-occupied and 26.3% were renter-occupied. The homeowner vacancy rate was 2.2% and the rental vacancy rate was 23.0%.

=== 2000 census ===
As of the 2000 census, 10,909 people, 3,964 households, and 2,929 families were residing in the county. The population density was 13 people per square mile (5.0 people/km^{2}). The 4,832 housing units averaged 6 units per square mile (2.3 units/km^{2}). The racial makeup of the county was 79.79% White, 4.61% African American, 0.66% Native American, 0.28% Asian, 12.55% from other races, and 2.11% from two or more races. About 41.98% of the population were Hispanics or Latinos of any race.

Of the 3,964 households, 36.6% had children under 18 living with them, 58.8% were married couples living together, 11.6% had a female householder with no husband present, and 26.1% were not families. About 23.6% of all households were made up of individuals, and 12.3% had someone living alone who was 65 or older. The average household size was 2.66, and the average family size was 3.15.

In the county, the age distribution was 30.6% under 18, 7.8% from 18 to 24, 25.1% from 25 to 44, 22.2% from 45 to 64, and 14.3% who were 65 or older. The median age was 36 years. For every 100 females, there were 99.8 males. For every 100 females age 18 and over, there were 92.3 males.

The median income for a household in the county was $29,386, and for a family was $36,014. Males had a median income of $31,373 versus $18,198 for females. The per capita income for the county was $14,393. About 15.80% of families and 17.90% of the population were below the poverty line, including 20.30% of those under age 18 and 20.10% of those age 65 or over.

== Government and infrastructure ==
An unincorporated area near Pyote is the site of the former Pyote Air Force Base. The facility housed the West Texas State School, operated by the Texas Youth Commission, until the youth detention facility closed in 2010.

=== Politics ===
United States presidential election results for Ward County, Texas
Year	Republican		Democratic		Third party(ies)	
Year	No.	%	No.	%	No.	%
1912	6	3.14%	147	76.96%	38	19.90%
1916	23	10.90%	178	84.36%	10	4.74%
1920	79	29.81%	181	68.30%	5	1.89%
1924	42	15.33%	206	75.18%	26	9.49%
1928	216	45.76%	256	54.24%	0	0.00%
1932	70	9.27%	678	89.80%	7	0.93%
1936	98	8.08%	1,113	91.76%	2	0.16%
1940	281	12.62%	1,931	86.71%	15	0.67%
1944	268	14.73%	1,448	79.60%	103	5.66%
1948	414	15.58%	2,119	79.72%	125	4.70%
1952	1,994	51.98%	1,840	47.97%	2	0.05%
1956	1,772	51.63%	1,638	47.73%	22	0.64%
1960	1,763	45.77%	2,018	52.39%	71	1.84%
1964	1,730	43.75%	2,221	56.17%	3	0.08%
1968	1,552	36.39%	1,331	31.21%	1,382	32.40%
1972	2,687	70.86%	1,049	27.66%	56	1.48%
1976	2,123	50.33%	2,046	48.51%	49	1.16%
1980	2,912	66.24%	1,405	31.96%	79	1.80%
1984	3,474	74.03%	1,188	25.31%	31	0.66%
1988	2,709	59.02%	1,858	40.48%	23	0.50%
1992	1,769	40.00%	1,695	38.33%	958	21.66%
1996	1,620	43.41%	1,644	44.05%	468	12.54%
2000	2,534	65.41%	1,256	32.42%	84	2.17%
2004	2,856	75.80%	901	23.91%	11	0.29%
2008	2,667	74.04%	899	24.96%	36	1.00%
2012	2,366	72.91%	841	25.92%	38	1.17%
2016	2,547	73.93%	783	22.73%	115	3.34%
2020	3,241	79.83%	764	18.82%	55	1.35%
2024	3,115	82.74%	627	16.65%	23	0.61%

United States Senate election results for Ward County, Texas1
Year	Republican		Democratic		Third party(ies)	
Year	No.	%	No.	%	No.	%
2024	2,931	78.64%	710	19.05%	86	2.31%

United States Senate election results for Ward County, Texas2
Year	Republican		Democratic		Third party(ies)	
Year	No.	%	No.	%	No.	%
2020	3,138	79.62%	725	18.40%	78	1.98%

Texas Gubernatorial election results for Ward County
Year	Republican		Democratic		Third party(ies)	
Year	No.	%	No.	%	No.	%
2022	2,065	82.01%	418	16.60%	35	1.39%

== Communities ==
=== Cities ===
- Barstow
- Monahans (county seat)

=== Towns ===
- Grandfalls
- Pyote
- Thorntonville
- Wickett

=== Census-designated place ===
- Southwest Sandhill

=== Unincorporated community ===
- Royalty

== See also ==
- Recorded Texas Historic Landmarks in Ward County
