= Monahans Sandhills State Park =

State park in Texas, United States

Monahans Sandhills
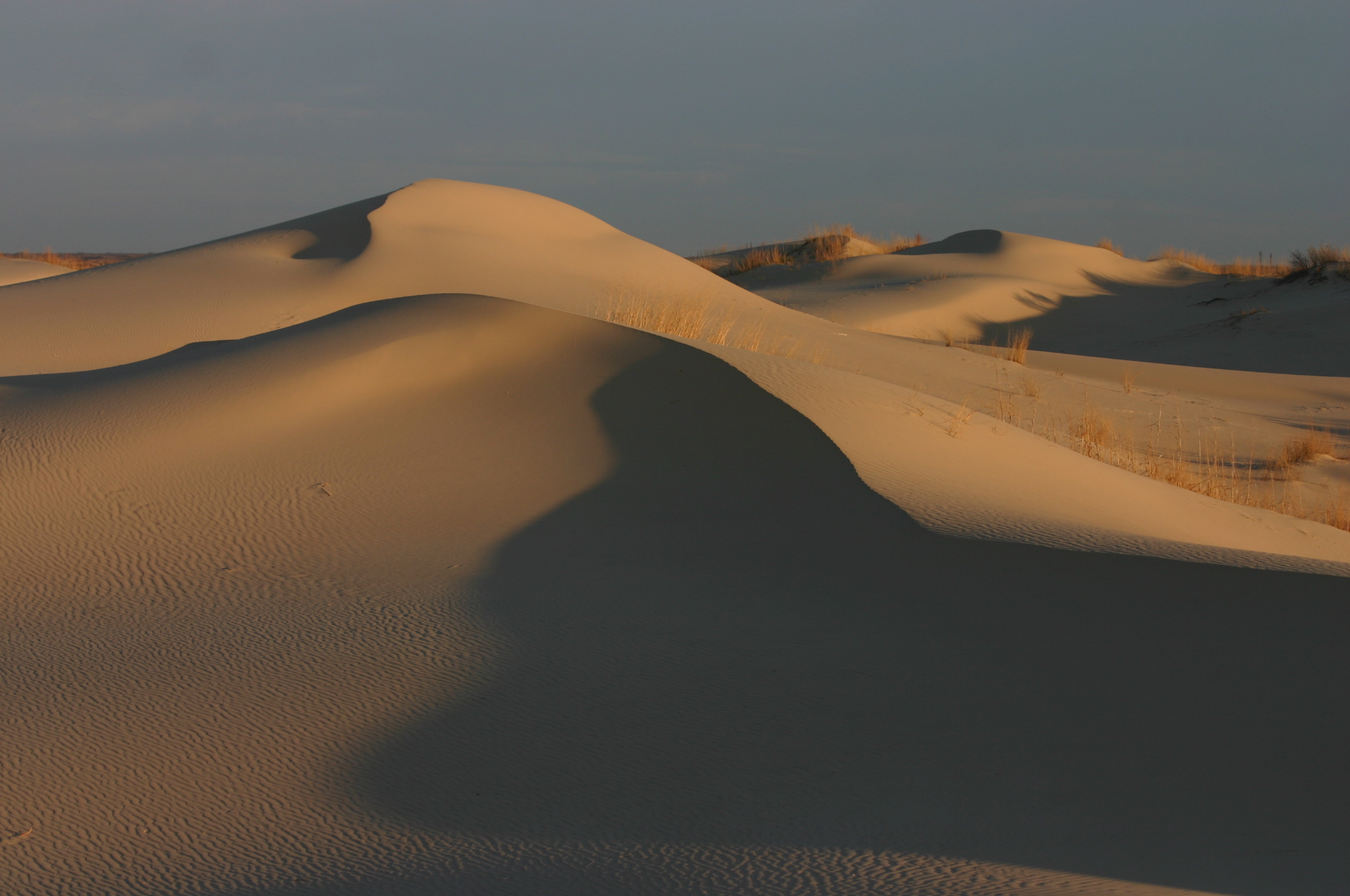
- Sandhills at sunrise

- Location within Texas Location within the United States
- Location: Ward / Winkler, Texas, United States
- Nearest city: Monahans
- Coordinates: 31°38′51″N 102°49′23″W
- Area: 3,840 acres (1,550 ha)
- Established: 1957
- Visitors: 55,336 (in 2025)
- Governing body: Texas Parks and Wildlife Department
- Website: Official site

Monahans Sandhills State Park is a 3,840-acre (1,550 ha) state park located in the southern Llano Estacado in Ward County and Winkler County, Texas, United States. The closest major town is Monahans, Texas. The park opened in 1957 and is managed by the Texas Parks and Wildlife Department.

Monahans Sandhills State Park is noted for the presence of sand dunes up to 70 feet (21 m) high. Although desert-like, the Monahans Sandhills are not a desert; they are a part of a semi-arid ecosystem (average annual rainfall 12.3 inches (310 mm)) characterized by the presence of both groundwater and relatively nutrient-poor windblown sand.

== History ==
Much of the Monahans Sandhills are privately owned property. The state of Texas is operating a 99-year lease with the Sealy-Smith Foundation for the ranch on which most of the land of the state park is located; the park opened to the public in 1957, and the state park has leasehold rights to this parcel of the sand hills until 2056.

The Monahans Sandhills are part of the Permian Basin of hydrocarbon formations, and some oil production continues in and around the state park.

== Geology ==
The Monahans Sandhills consist of a sand deposits 70 miles long and 20 miles wide from Crane County, Texas to Andrews County, Texas. The Llano Estacado escarpment to the east is a barrier to further wind transport of sediment. The sand probably reached its greatest areal extent in the Late Pleistocene, 16,000 years before the present, with an earlier period of dune building 25,000 years before the present. The dunes consist of almost pure quartz grains with an average diameter of less than 0.22 mm, which is fairly uniform for all of the grains. Dune types include coppice, wind-shadow, Akle, Barchan, and parabolic. Winds from the southeast in the summer, from the northwest in the winter, and the southwest during spring, influence dune shape. These changes in wind directions change the shapes of the dunes and their position, but in general the dunes don't migrate, retaining their position and form when measured year to year.

== Nature ==
=== Animals ===
Despite the sterility of the landscape, various animals such as mule deer, American badger, coyote, Ord's kangaroo rat, Jones' pocket gopher and Rio Grande ground squirrel are relatively common. Jerusalem cricket are often seen making their way across the sand.

=== Plants ===
The Havard oak is a local climax shrub, an unusual type of oak tree which because of local conditions often achieves full growth of only 4 feet (1.2 m) in height. Most of an oak's biomass exists in the form of a lengthy root system reaching down to groundwater. If a Monahans sand dune has become stabilized and has stopped blowing about in the wind, that is often because a small grove of Havard oaks has stabilized the dune with their extensive root systems.

== Activities ==
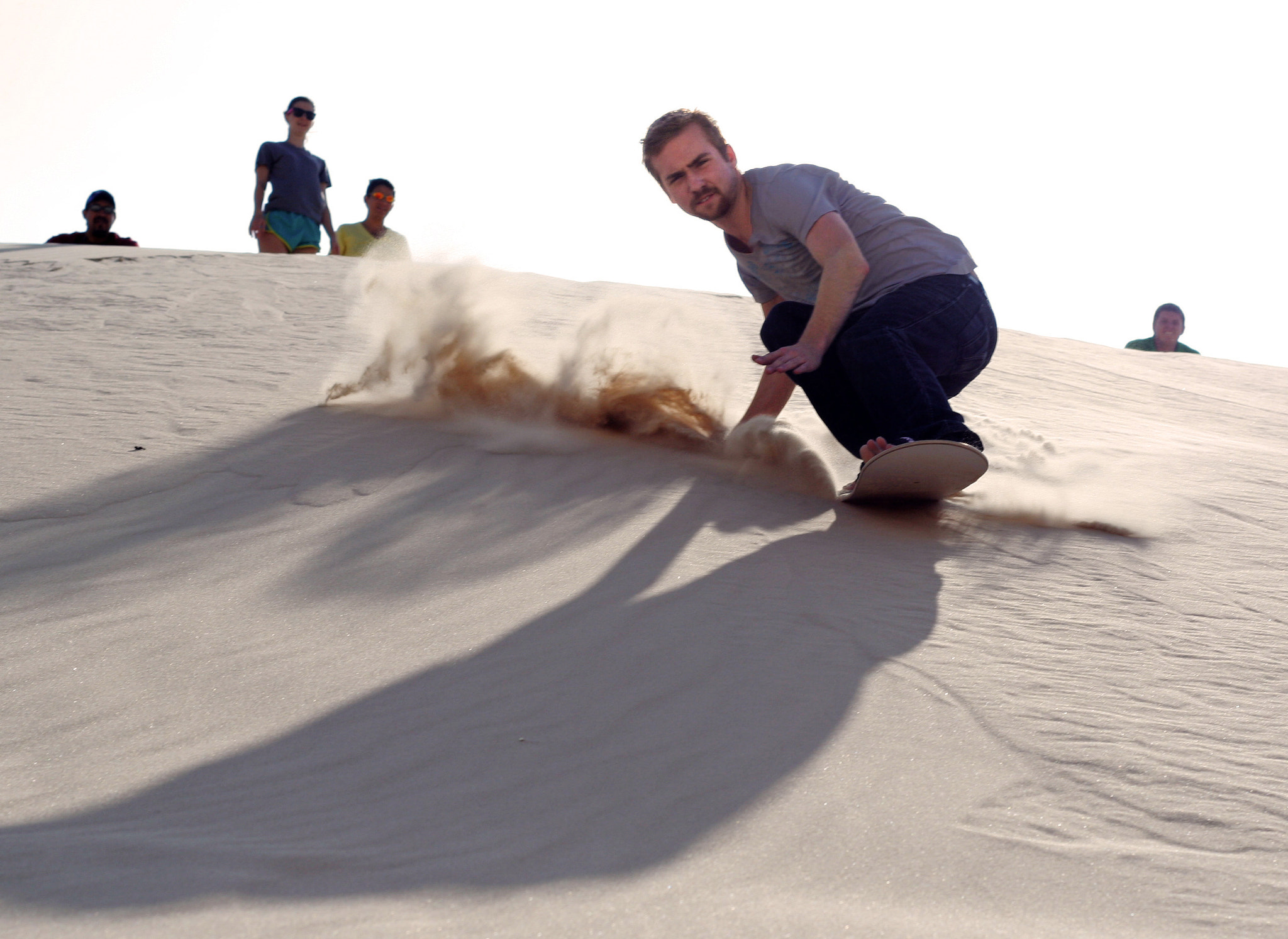
Sandboarding in the park

Visitors practice several local forms of recreation at the Monahans Sandhills, such as sandboarding, 'sand football', 'sand surfing', and sand tobogganing.

== See also ==
- List of Texas state parks
- Mescalero Ridge
- Odessa Meteor Crater
- Pecos River
