= Texas State School =

Texas State School or Texas state school may refer to:

== Australia ==
- Texas State School, a primary school in Texas, Queensland, Australia

== United States ==
- Texas state supported living centers, state-run residential facilities for people with intellectual disabilities in the US state of Texas, previously known as Texas state schools
- Juvenile detention facilities operated by the Texas Juvenile Justice Department (TJJD) and its predecessor, the Texas Youth Commission:
  - Crockett State School
  - Gainesville State Juvenile Correctional Facility – formerly Gainesville State School
  - Giddings State School
  - J.W. Hamilton Jr. State School – Bryan
  - Ron Jackson State Juvenile Correctional Complex – formerly Brownwood State School
  - Al Price State Juvenile Correctional Facility – formerly Jefferson County State School
  - John Shero State Juvenile Correctional Facility – formerly San Saba State School
- Public universities operated by the seven state university systems in Texas:
  - Texas A&M University System
  - Texas State University System
  - Texas Tech University System
  - Texas Woman's University
  - University of Houston System
  - University of North Texas System
  - University of Texas System

== See also ==
- Education in Texas
- Corsicana Residential Treatment Center – defunct TJJD juvenile detention center previously named the Corsicana State Home
