= Law enforcement officer =

Public-sector employee whose duties primarily involve the enforcement of laws

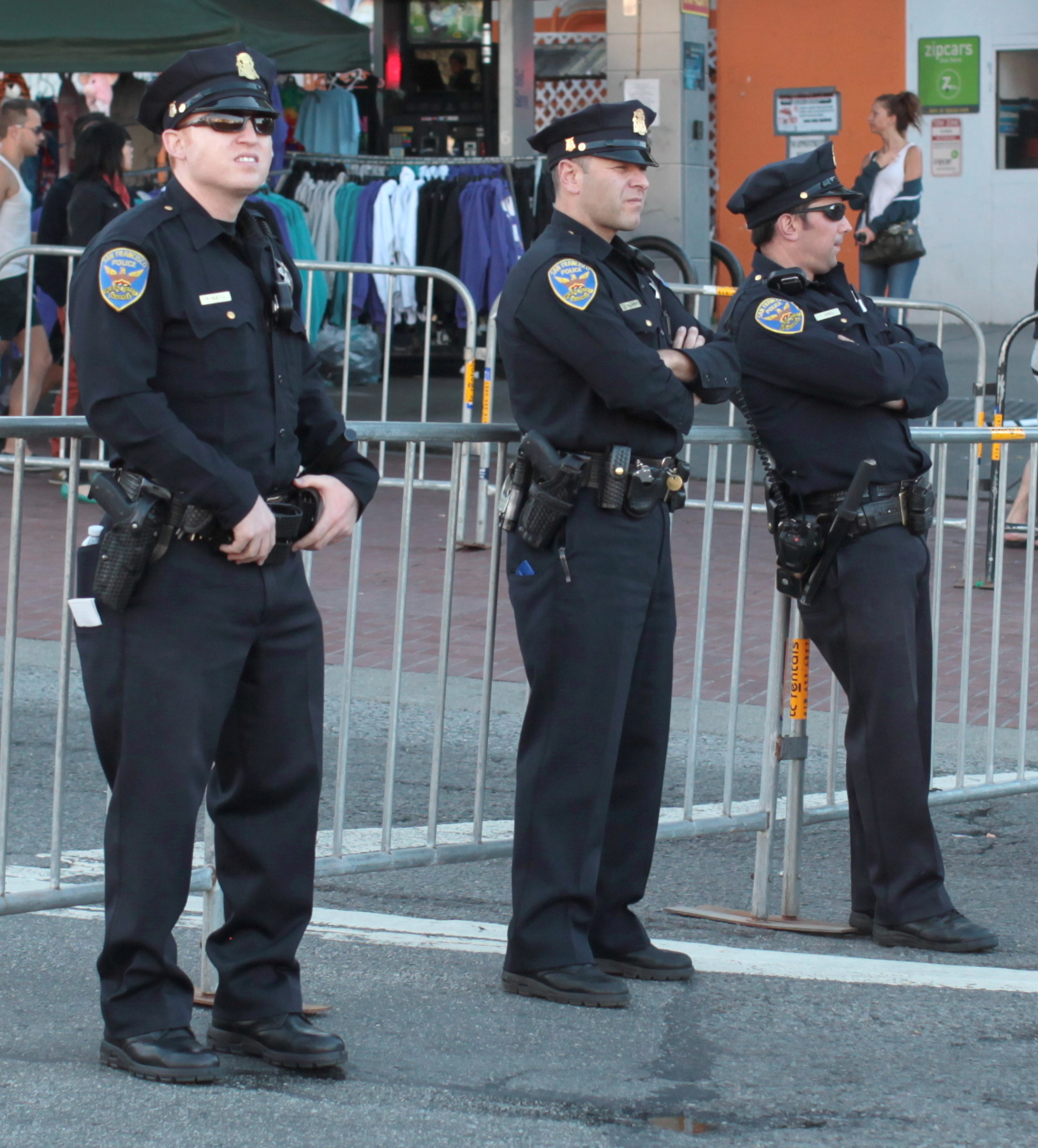
San Francisco Police Department officers overseeing a Pink Saturday event in 2012

A law enforcement officer (LEO), or police officer or peace officer in North American English, is a public-sector or private-sector employee whose duties primarily involve the enforcement of laws, protecting life & property, keeping the peace, and other public safety related duties. Law enforcement officers are designated certain powers & authority by law to allow them to carry out their responsibilities.

Modern legal codes use the term peace officer (or in some jurisdictions, law enforcement officer) to include every person vested by the legislating state with law enforcement authority. Traditionally, anyone "sworn, badged, and armable" who can arrest, or refer such arrest for a criminal prosecution. Security officers may enforce certain laws and administrative regulations, which may include detainment or apprehension authority, including arresting in some jurisdictions. Peace officers may also be able to perform all duties that a law enforcement officer is tasked with, but may or may not be armed with a weapon. The term peace officer in some jurisdictions is interchangeable with law enforcement officer or police officer, but in others peace officer is a totally separate legal designation with quasi-police powers.

== Canada ==
In Canada, the Criminal Code (R.S., c. C-34, s. 2.) defines a peace officer as:

Peace officer includes

- (a) a mayor, warden, reeve, sheriff, deputy sheriff, sheriff's officer, and justice of the peace,
- (b) a member of the Correctional Service of Canada who is designated as a peace officer pursuant to Part I of the Corrections and Conditional Release Act, and a warden, deputy warden, instructor, keeper, jailer, guard and any other officer or permanent employee of a prison other than a penitentiary as defined in Part I of the Corrections and Conditional Release Act,
- (c) a police officer, police constable, bailiff, constable, or other person employed for the preservation and maintenance of the public peace or the service or execution of civil process,
- (d) an officer within the meaning of the Customs Act, the Excise Act or the Excise Act, 2001, or a person having the powers of such an officer, when performing any duty in the administration of any of those Acts,
- (d.1) an officer authorized under subsection 138(1) of the Immigration and Refugee Protection Act,
- (e) a person designated as a fishery guardian under the Fisheries Act when performing any duties or functions under that Act and a person designated as a fishery officer under the Fisheries Act when performing any duties or functions under that Act or the Coastal Fisheries Protection Act,
- (f) the pilot in command of an aircraft
  - (i) registered in Canada under regulations made under the Aeronautics Act, or
  - (ii) leased without crew and operated by a person who is qualified under regulations made under the Aeronautics Act to be registered as the owner of an aircraft registered in Canada under those regulations, while the aircraft is in flight, and
- (g) officers and non-commissioned members of the Canadian Forces who are
  - (i) appointed for the purposes of section 156 of the National Defence Act, (Military Police) or
  - (ii) employed on duties that the Governor in Council, in regulations made under the National Defence Act for this paragraph, has prescribed to be of such a kind as to necessitate that the officers and non-commissioned members performing them have the powers of peace officers;

Section (b) allows for designation as a peace officer for a member of the Correctional Service of Canada under the following via the Corrections and Conditional Release Act:

*10. The Commissioner may in writing designate any staff member, either by name or by class, to be a peace officer, and a staff member so designated has all the powers, authority, protection and privileges that a peace officer has by law in respect of

- (a) an offender subject to a warrant or an order for long-term supervision; and
- (b) any person, while the person is in a penitentiary.

Also, provincial legislatures can designate a class of officers (i.e. Conservation Officers, Park Rangers and Commercial Vehicle Safety and Enforcement) to be peace officers.

== United States ==
United States federal law enforcement personnel include but are not limited to the following:

1. Bureau of Alcohol, Tobacco, Firearms and Explosives
2. Bureau of Diplomatic Security
3. Customs and Border Protection
4. Drug Enforcement Administration
5. Federal Air Marshal Service
6. Federal Bureau of Investigation
7. Federal Flight Deck Officers
8. Federal Reserve Police Department
9. United States Secret Service
10. Fish and Wildlife Service - Law Enforcement
11. Bureau of Land Management - Law Enforcement
12. Homeland Security Investigations
13. Immigration and Customs Enforcement
14. National Park Service - Law Enforcement
15. Federal Bureau of Prisons
16. United States Marshal Service
17. U.S. Coast Guard
18. United States Postal Inspection Service
19. United States Department of Veterans Affairs Police

In addition, many departments in the U.S. Federal Government contain Inspector Generals who are able to appoint criminal investigators to work under them.

For an exhaustive list of all federal law enforcement agents, you can find it on Federal law enforcement in the United States.

=== Arizona ===
Arizona Revised Statutes defines a peace officer in Title 13, Section 105, as "any person vested by law with a duty to maintain public order and make arrests and includes a constable." Title 1, Section 215(27) enumerates those who are peace officers in the State of Arizona. It includes:

1. sheriffs' deputies of counties
2. constables
3. marshals
4. SWAT teams and police officers of cities, towns, and villages
5. commissioned personnel of the department of public safety and state troopers
6. personnel who are employed by the state department of corrections and the department of juvenile corrections and who have received a certificate from the Arizona peace officer standards and training board
7. peace officers who are appointed by a multi-county water conservation district and who have received a certificate from the Arizona peace officer standards and training board
8. police officers who are appointed by community college district governing boards and who have received a certificate from the Arizona peace officer standards and training board
9. police officers who are appointed by the Arizona board of regents and who have received a certificate from the Arizona peace officer standards and training board
10. police officers who are appointed by the governing body of a public airport according to section 28-8426 and who have received a certificate from the Arizona peace officer standards and training board
11. peace officers who are appointed by a private post-secondary institution under section 15-1897 and who have received a certificate from the Arizona peace officer standards and training board
12. special agents from the office of the attorney general, or of a county attorney, and who have received a certificate from the Arizona peace officer standards and training board

Arizona Revised Statutes 41-1823 states that except for duly elected or appointed sheriffs and constables, and probation officers in the course of their duties, no person may exercise the authority or perform the duties of a peace officer unless he is certified by the Arizona peace officers standards and training board.

=== California ===
Sections 830 through 831.7 of the California Penal Code list persons who are considered peace officers within the State of California. Peace officers include, in addition to many others,

1. Police; sheriffs, undersheriffs, and their deputies. (§ 830.1[a])
2. Investigators of the California Department of Consumer Affairs. (§ 830.3[a])
3. Inspectors or investigators employed in the office of a district attorney. (§ 830.1[a])
4. The California Attorney General and special agents and investigators of the California Department of Justice. (§ 830.1[b])
5. Members of the California Highway Patrol. (§ 830.2[a])
6. Special agents of the California Department of Corrections and Rehabilitation. (§ 830.2[d])
7. Game wardens of the California Department of Fish and Wildlife (§ 830.2[e])
8. California State Park Peace Officers (§ 830.2[f])
9. Investigators of the California Department of Alcoholic Beverage Control. (§ 830.2[h])
10. Cal Expo Police Officers (§ 830.2[i])(§ 830.3[q])
11. Investigators of the California Department of Motor Vehicles. (§ 830.3[c])
12. The State Fire Marshal and assistant or deputy state fire marshals. (§ 830.3[e])
13. Fraud investigators of the California Department of Insurance. (§ 830.3[i])
14. Investigators of the Employment Development Department. (§ 830.3[q])
15. A person designated by a local agency as a Park Ranger (§ 830.31[b])
16. Members of the University of California Police Department, California State University Police Department or of a California Community College Police Department. (§ 830.2 [b]&[c]/ 830.32 [a])
17. Members of the San Francisco Bay Area Rapid Transit District Police Department. (§ 830.33 [a])
18. Any railroad police officer commissioned by the Governor. (§ 830.33 [e] [1])
19. Welfare fraud Investigators of the California Department of Social Services. (§ 830.35[a])
20. County coroners and deputy coroners. (§ 830.35[c])
21. Firefighter/Security Officers of the California Military Department. (§ PC 830.37)
22. Hospital Police Officers with the California Department of State Hospitals (used to be California Department of Mental Health) and the California Department of Developmental Services (§ 830.38)
23. County Probation Officers, County Deputy Probation Officers, Parole officers and correctional officers of the California Department of Corrections and Rehabilitation. (§ 830.5 [a]&[b])
24. A security officer for a private university or college deputized or appointed as a reserve deputy sheriff or police officer. (§ 830.75)

Most peace officers have jurisdiction throughout the state, but many have limited powers outside their political subdivisions. Some peace officers require special permission to carry firearms. Powers are often limited to the performance of peace officers' primary duties (usually, enforcement of specific laws within their political subdivision); however, most have power of arrest anywhere in the state for any public offense that poses an immediate danger to a person or property.

A private person (i.e., ordinary citizen) may arrest another person for an offense committed in the arresting person's presence, or if the other person has committed a felony whether or not in the arresting person's presence (Penal Code § 837), though such an arrest when an offense has not occurred leaves a private person open to criminal prosecution and civil liability for false arrest. A peace officer may:

- without an arrest warrant, arrest a person on probable cause that the person has committed an offense in the officer's presence, or if there is probable cause that a felony has been committed and the officer has probable cause to believe the person to be arrested committed the felony. (Penal Code § 836).
- Is immune from civil liability for false arrest if, at the time of arrest, the officer had probable cause to believe the arrest was lawful.

Persons are required to comply with certain instructions given by a peace officer, and certain acts (e.g., battery) committed against a peace officer carry more severe penalties than the same acts against a private person. It is unlawful to resist, delay, or obstruct a peace officer in the course of the officer's duties (Penal Code § 148[a][1]).

=== New York State ===
New York State grants peace officers very specific powers under NYS Criminal Procedure Law, that they may make warrantless arrests, use physical and deadly force, and issue summonses under section 2.20 of that law.

There is a full list of peace officers under Section 2.10 of that law. Below are some examples.

1. That state has law enforcement agencies contained within existing executive branch departments that employ sworn peace officers to investigate and enforce laws specifically related to the department. Most often, these departments employ sworn Investigators (separate from the New York State Police) that have statewide investigative authority under the department's mission.
2. The New York State Bureau of Narcotic Enforcement (BNE) is a state investigative agency housed under the State Department of Health. Narcotic Investigators with the Bureau of Narcotic Enforcement are sworn peace officers who carry firearms, make arrests, and enforce the New York State Controlled Substances Act, New York State Penal Law, and New York State Public Health Law.
3. The New York State Department of Taxation and Finance employs sworn peace officers as Excise Tax Investigators and Revenue Crimes Investigators. These State Investigators carry firearms, make arrests, and enforce New York State Penal Law related to tax evasion and other crimes. Excise Tax Investigators may execute Search Warrants.
4. The New York State Department of Motor Vehicles (DMV) Division of Field Investigation also employ sworn peace officers as State Investigators. All DMV Investigators carry Glock 23 firearms and enforce New York State Penal Law and New York Vehicle and Traffic Law. The DMV Division of Field Investigation investigates auto theft, odometer tampering, fraudulent documents, and identity theft crimes.

=== Texas ===
Texas Statutes, Code of Criminal Procedure, Art. 2.12, provides:

Art. 2.12, WHO ARE PEACE OFFICERS. The following are peace officers:

(1) sheriffs, their deputies, and those reserve deputies who hold a permanent peace officer license issued under Chapter 1701, Occupations Code;
(2) constables, deputy constables, and those reserve deputy constables who hold a permanent peace officer license issued under Chapter 1701, Occupations Code;
(3) marshals or police officers of an incorporated city, town, or village, and those reserve municipal police officers who hold a permanent peace officer license issued under Chapter 1701, Occupations Code;
(4) rangers and officers commissioned by the Public Safety Commission and the Director of the Department of Public Safety;
(5) investigators of the district attorneys', criminal district attorneys', and county attorneys' offices;
(6) law enforcement agents of the Texas Alcoholic Beverage Commission;
(7) each member of an arson investigating unit commissioned by a city, a county, or the state;
(8) officers commissioned under Section 37.081, Education Code, or Subchapter E, Chapter 51, Education Code;
(9) officers commissioned by the General Services Commission;
(10) law enforcement officers commissioned by the Parks and Wildlife Commission;
(11) airport police officers commissioned by a city with a population of more than 1.18 million that operates an airport that serves commercial air carriers;
(12) airport security personnel commissioned as peace officers by the governing body of any political subdivision of this state, other than a city described by Subdivision (11), that operates an airport that serves commercial air carriers;
(13) municipal park and recreational patrolmen and security officers;
(14) security officers and investigators commissioned as peace officers by the comptroller;
(15) officers commissioned by a water control and improvement district under Section 49.216, Water Code;
(16) officers commissioned by a board of trustees under Chapter 54, Transportation Code;
(17) investigators commissioned by the Texas Medical Board;
(18) officers commissioned by the board of managers of the Dallas County Hospital District, the Tarrant County Hospital District, or the Bexar County Hospital District under Section 281.057, Health and Safety Code;
(19) county park rangers commissioned under Subchapter E, Chapter 351, Local Government Code;
(20) investigators employed by the Texas Racing Commission;
(21) officers commissioned under Chapter 554, Occupations Code;
(22) officers commissioned by the governing body of a metropolitan rapid transit authority under Section 451.108, Transportation Code, or by a regional transportation authority under Section 452.110, Transportation Code;
(23) investigators commissioned by the attorney general under Section 402.009, Government Code;
(24) security officers and investigators commissioned as peace officers under Chapter 466, Government Code;
(25) an officer employed by the Department of State Health Services under Section 431.2471, Health and Safety Code;
(26) officers appointed by an appellate court under Subchapter F, Chapter 53, Government Code;
(27) officers commissioned by the state fire marshal under Chapter 417, Government Code;
(28) an investigator commissioned by the commissioner of insurance under Section 701.104, Insurance Code;
(29) apprehension specialists and inspectors general commissioned by the Texas Youth Commission as officers under Sections 61.0451 and 61.0931, Human Resources Code;
(30) officers appointed by the inspector general of the Texas Department of Criminal Justice under Section 493.019, Government Code;
(31) investigators commissioned by the Commission on Law Enforcement Officer Standards and Education under Section 1701.160, Occupations Code;
(32) commission investigators commissioned by the Texas Private Security Board under Section 1702.061(f), Occupations Code;
(33) the fire marshal and any officers, inspectors, or investigators commissioned by an emergency services district under Chapter 775, Health and Safety Code;
(34) officers commissioned by the State Board of Dental Examiners under Section 254.013, Occupations Code, subject to the limitations imposed by that section; and
(35) investigators commissioned by the Texas Juvenile Probation Commission as officers under Section 141.055, Human Resources Code.

== See also ==
- National Law Enforcement Officers Memorial
- Peace Officers Memorial Day
- Federal law enforcement in the United States
