= Faith Christian School (Texas) =

Coordinates: 32.9373°N 97.0703°W

Information
- Funding type: Private school
- Established: 1999; 27 years ago
- Grades: Pre-Kindergarten - Grade 12
- Enrollment: c.850
- Website: www.grapevinefaith.com

Grapevine Faith Christian School (GFCS) is a private Christian school in Grapevine, Texas, United States. It was established in the year 1999 and moved into the former Grapevine Middle School building in 2001. It currently has about 850 students from grades Pre-kindergarten to 12th.

== History ==
The first year of Grapevine Faith Christian School was in 1999 at Grapevine Baptist Church with around 300 students. In 2001, the school moved into the former campus of Grapevine Middle School on Worth Street. Then, in 2010, the Dallas Road high school campus was completed, which hosted grades 9-12. In 2014, a tunnel going under the railroad tracks was completed, allowing safe travel between the 2 campuses. 2 years later, the school redid its old football field and track to improve for sporting events. In 2023, a new high school baseball field was built on the Dallas Road campus.

== Athletics ==
GFCS participates as a member of TAPPS. Their Athletic teams are nicknamed The Lions. In December 2016, the varsity Lions football team claimed the state TAPPS title.

=== One Heart Bowl ===
GFCS previously maintained a "rivalry" with the Gainesville State School, a Texas Juvenile Justice Department maximum-security juvenile detention facility. (The "rivalry" was, from a competition standpoint, one-sided as FCS has won all of the matchups.)

The rivalry began when GFCS and Gainesville State were placed in the same district in 2008 for athletic competition.

After learning about how the Gainesville State program operated (the team plays all its games on the road, has no fan base outside of its coaches and the guards assigned to escort the team each week, and the roster – where players are identified only by their first name and first initial of their last name – is subject to significant turnover due to players being released from custody or removed from the team for disciplinary action), GFCS head football coach/athletic director Kris Hogan sent an unusual request to the team's fans – he asked them to form a spirit line and cheer for the Gainesville State players in their upcoming game. The game made national headlines.

The teams played again in district competition in 2009 (now renamed "One Heart Bowl"); the game featured (then) Cowboys coach Wade Phillips in attendance.

Gainesville State and GFCS were moved into different districts in 2010; however, GFCS and Gainesville State continued the annual football game. until Gainesville State elected to play six-man football instead.
