= Who Gets a Childhood? =

- Author: William S. Bush
- Publication date: 15 September 2010
- ISBN: 9-780-8203-3719-7

Who Gets a Childhood? Race and Juvenile Justice in Twentieth‐Century Texas is a 2010 book by William S. Bush, published by the University of Georgia Press. It discusses the juvenile corrections system of Texas and the cycles of attempts at reform and the failures of these attempts. The book chronicles conflicts between people wishing to reform the juvenile justice system and make it rehabilitate versus those who were favoring imprisonment. It also discusses how officials perceived non-Hispanic White prisoners to be reformable while African-Americans and Hispanic prisoners were viewed as un-reformable; they believed that only younger white persons were capable of reforming.

According to Diamond, Who Gets a Childhood?'s "most important innovation involves its handling of the social, political, and cultural forces—local, state, and national—that shaped the conditions within these institutions."

== Background ==
Sources used to write the book which originated from the Gatesville State School, the Texas Board of Control, and the Texas Youth Commission, include member files and annual reports. Summary statistics of internal narrative case files, newspaper articles, legal cases, Texas state legislation, and court testimony from defendants were also used. Jennifer Trost of Utica College wrote that the author does not "seem" to be in possession of the case files themselves.

== Content ==
The book is written chronologically. Most of the book's content discusses Texas's juvenile correctional facilities, with the content beginning with the Gatesville State School, first established in 1889. The book also discusses how theories on adolescence, penology and juvenile delinquency changed over time; the contrast between more and less innocuous media depictions of juvenile delinquents; statistics on the juvenile inmates, their crimes, and their attributes; and what David I. MacLeod of Central Michigan University described as "at least hinting at changing political climates in Texas." The book discusses how prisoners dealt with their sentences and time at the juvenile correctional facilities, illustrated by the use of personal papers and case studies. Deborah L. Blackwell of Texas A&M International University referred to this as "one of the most interesting elements" of Who Gets a Childhood? There are portions discussing community corrections programs for juveniles in Houston.

Andrew J. Diamond of the Center for International Studies and Research in Paris, France stated that book focuses on the 1910s through the 1920s and the 1940s through the 1970s. MacLeod described the book as being focused on the 1910s, 1940s, and 1960s through 1980s, "loosely structured around multiple cycles of tentative reform". Diamond stated that there is very little content about the 1980s and 1990s, and that the scope of the book is "more limited" than what the title would suggest.

According to MacLeod, many of the paragraphs come from "disparate" topics and are very long, and that a reader may be confused by "digressive passages" and "abrupt shifts of focus". In addition MacLeod stated "The level of detail can, however, overwhelm a reader at times."

According to Trost the juvenile justice analysis related to the 1930s-1950s was new, while there had been previous research related to 1890s-1920s and 1960s covered by previous books. According to Trost, the author "has lined up with the founders of the juvenile system in favor of treatment for individuals rather than punishment of crimes."

== Reception ==
Diamond concluded that "Bush’s multilayered analysis of some seven decades of Texas juvenile justice breaks new ground in a number of ways, and it should be required reading for anyone working at the intersection of race and juvenile justice in the twentieth century." Diamond stated that there were some "minor shortcomings" related to dealing with race and civil rights issues in a "schematic manner"; he argued that the book was too vague on the role of Mexicans and how they were treated as people unable to reform, and Diamond also stated that the book did not connect how the black power movement resulted in correctional authorities trying to imprison black juveniles in more restrictive facilities. He also stated that the book did not give enough attention to the role of prison gangs.

C. D. Wintz of Texas Southern University stated that he highly recommended the book and gave it three stars.

MacLeod concluded that "the book under review is an immensely informative account of the complexities of reform and repression within the training schools of a state known for its tough penal culture."
