= Gatesville State School =

Former juvenile correctional facility in Texas, United States

Coordinates: 31°28′07″N 97°44′19″W

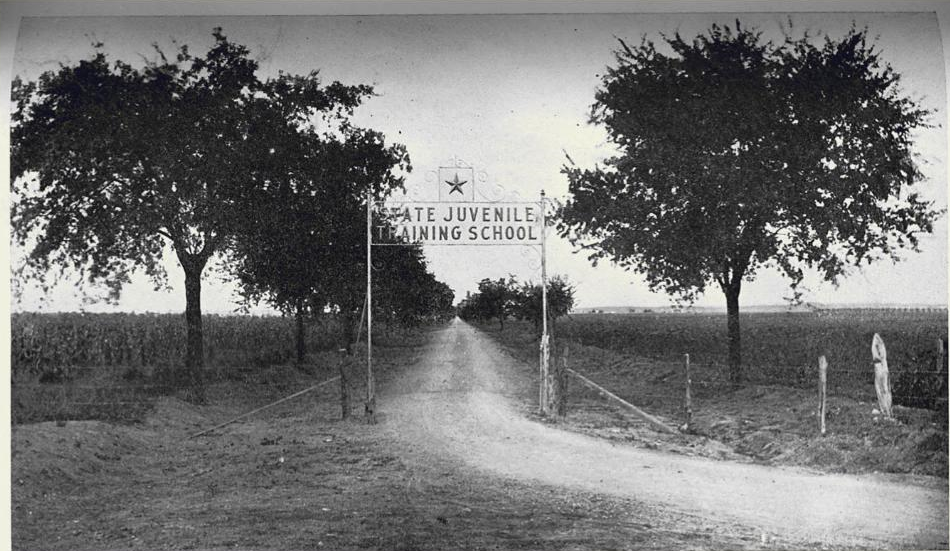
Gatesville State School (1921)

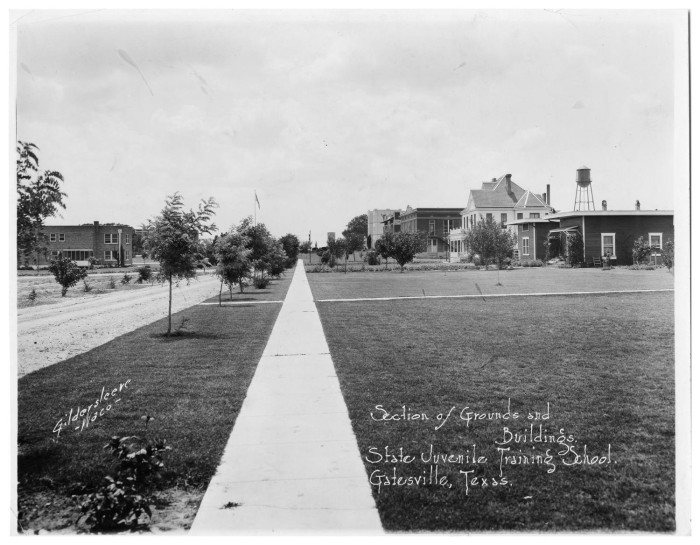
A photograph of the Texas State Juvenile Training School, date unknown - Photographed by Fred Gildersleeve (died 1958)

The Gatesville State School for Boys was a juvenile corrections facility in Gatesville, Texas. The 900-acre (360 ha) facility was converted into two prisons for adults, the Christina Crain Unit (formerly Gatesville Unit), and the Hilltop Unit.

== History ==
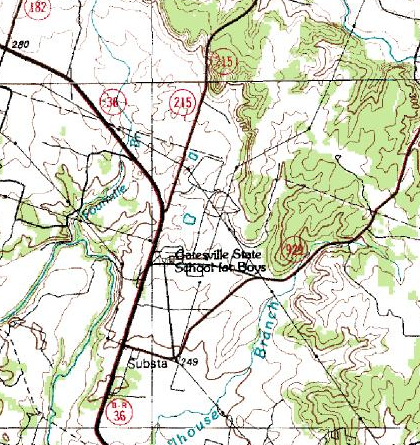
Topographic map, July 1, 1983, U.S. Geological Survey

The Texas Legislature established the House of Correction and Reformatory, the first rehabilitative juvenile correctional facility in the Southern United States, in 1887. The facility, operated by the Texas Prison System, opened in January 1889 with 68 boys who had previously been located in correctional facilities with adult felons. The Victorian reformers who opened the facility intended for the farmwork in the dry climate and the schooling to reform juvenile delinquents. At the beginning the institution also housed boys who did not commit any crimes but had no family and no other place to live in. Children were previously housed in the Huntsville Unit, a prison which also housed adults, in Huntsville.

Robert Perkinson, author of Texas Tough: The Rise of America's Prison Empire, said that the institution gained "a reputation for ruthlessness" as decades passed. Gatesville, which served as the main juvenile detention facility for Texas since its opening, had a focus on labor instead of rehabilitation. Throughout the state school's history the state government did not appropriate sufficient funds, and the dormitories became overcrowded. Before the state school first opened, the reformatory officials complained about an influx of non-White children who they believed were not capable of being rehabilitated. Michael Jewell, a former Gatesville state school student who attended the school in 1961, said that long periods in solitary confinement, stoop labor, fights between gangs, beatings perpetrated by staff members, and sexual assault occurred at the facility. Perkinson said that Gatesville, intended to resemble the Elmira Correctional Facility in Elmira, New York, instead had an attitude similar to that of the Texas prison farms for adults.

In 1909 the legislature changed the facility's name to the State Institution for the Training of Juveniles and placed it under the control of a five member board of trustees. In 1913 a law that was passed renamed the facility to the State Juvenile Training School.

The 1913 Juvenile Act stated that White boys at Gatesville would be separated from boys of other races. In 1913 the school opened the "Negroes' Institute," facilities for Black boys.

In 1919 the newly established State Board of Control began managing the state school. In 1939 the legislature named the juvenile correctional facility the Gatesville State School for Boys. In 1940 the Gatesville State School housed 767 boys who were under 17 at the time the state ordered them to attend the state school. At the time the boys conducted activities on a 900-acre (360 ha) tract of state-owned land and a 2,700-acre (1,100 ha) tract of leased land. In 1949 the State Youth Development Council began to operate the Gatesville State School. In 1950 the state school had 406 boys. In 1957 the Texas Youth Council, now the Texas Youth Commission, was established, replacing its predecessor agency. The Mountain View School for Boys opened on September 5, 1962, and chronic and serious juvenile delinquents were moved to Mountain View.

By 1970, the state school, with 1,830 boys, consisted of seven sub-schools: Hackberry, Hilltop, Live Oak, Riverside, Sycmore, Terrace, and Valley. Gatesville also housed the reception center for boys entering TYC. In 1971 a class-action lawsuit was filed against the Texas Youth Council on behalf of the children in TYC facilities. In 1974 the school had 1,500 boys over 250 staff members. During that year, federal judge William Wayne Justice ruled on Morales v. Turman. Justice said that the operations of the state schools consisted of cruel and unusual practices that violated the Eighth Amendment to the United States Constitution. Justice ordered TYC to close the Gatesville State School and the Mountain View State School and to redesign the agency's juvenile corrections system. Gatesville State School closed in 1979. The boys moved to smaller state schools, foster and group homes, halfway houses, and residential treatment centers. The state schools taking juvenile offenders included Brownwood State School (now Ron Jackson), Crockett State School in Crockett, Gainesville State School near Gainesville, Giddings State School near Giddings, and West Texas Children's Home of Pyote near Pyote.

The Texas Department of Corrections purchased the former state school lands. In 1980 the Live Oak, Riverside, Sycamore, Terrace, and Valley schools became the Gatesville Unit (now the Christina Melton Crain Unit), and the Hilltop and Hackberry schools became the Hilltop Unit, both of which are women's prisons.

== Education ==
In 1915 the Texas State Board of Education certified the state school as an independent school district, allowing it to get funding for school supplies and teacher salaries.

== Student culture ==
The school newspaper, State Boys, started in 1914. William S. Bush, author of Who Gets a Childhood?: Race and Juvenile Justice in Twentieth-Century Texas, said that the school newspaper's main purpose was to serve as a pro-prison administration propaganda organ.

== Legacy ==
The Hilltop Unit still uses many buildings that were a part of the original House of Correction and Reformatory. A graveyard with sixteen graves containing the remains of children in the state school who died during their stay is located on the Riverside Unit.

== Notable residents ==
- David Resendez Ruíz (plaintiff of Ruiz v. Estelle) - First arrived in 1954, had four sessions in Gatesville

== See also ==
- Texas Youth Commission

== Works cited ==
- Bush, William S. Who Gets a Childhood?: Race and Juvenile Justice in Twentieth-Century Texas University of Georgia Press, 2010. ISBN 0-8203-3719-6, ISBN 978-0-8203-3719-7.
