= Texas state supported living centers =

Residential facilities run by the state for people with intellectual disabilities

Texas state supported living centers (formerly state schools) are a collection of residential facilities run by the state for people with intellectual disabilities in Texas, United States. The schools, operated by the Texas Health and Human Services Commission operate under the Federal Intermediate Care Facilities for Individuals with Intellectual Disabilities (ICF/IID) program.

The 13 state facilities provide round-the-clock care for more than 4,500 Texans with mild, moderate, severe or profound developmental delays and people with developmental delays who are also medically fragile or who have behavioral issues. The average age of residents is 46, and 72 percent of residents have profound or severe developmental delays (i.e., IQ is below 40).

On May 20, 2009, the state reached an agreement with the U.S. Department of Justice on a comprehensive action plan to improve care and coordination of services for persons who reside at state supported living centers. The agreement outlines the state's plan to address issues identified by the Department of Justice in 2006 and 2008.

Scott Schalchlin was named assistant commissioner for the State Supported Living Centers (SSLC) in December 2013.

== Abilene State Supported Living Center ==
Abilene State Supported Living Center, located in Abilene, is home to approximately 240 people with developmental disabilities. Among amenities are a nature area and a large park and playground area.

The site that was to become Abilene State School was originally a State Epileptic Colony. The project was launched in 1897 when Governor Joseph D. Sayers appointed a commission to select the site. The institution was to be patterned after the Craig Colony in New York, and was originally intended to house five hundred people.

Citizens of Abilene were eager to have the state select a nearby site, for the boost it would provide to the local economy. Since the water supply was poor, residents banded together to purchase land to build Lytle Lake. Citizens also donated $3,200 for the city to purchase 640 acres (2.6 km^{2}) of land to be given to the state for the institution. The Texas legislature unanimously approved the site in February 1899.

Construction, coordinated by Dr. John Preston, cost $200,000. The project consisted of an administration building, a power plant, one hospital each for men and women, four cottages, and a residence for the superintendent. The State Epileptic Colony was officially opened on March 26, 1904, with a population of 104 patients. Some were admitted free, and others paid $5 a week for room, board, medication, and care. By August 1904, the population was 201.Dr. T.B.Bass served as superintendent from 1909 to 1943. During his tenure, droughts caused water shortages and hurt crop production. World War I siphoned off staff, and wartime inflation caused fiscal hardship. The institution faced outbreaks of flu, small pox, and measles.

In 1925, the State Epileptic Colony began admitting residents with mental illness as well as those with epilepsy. The name was changed to Abilene State Hospital.

The campus had expanded to sixty-three buildings by 1943, including officers' quarters, physicians' cottages, two hospitals, twenty-eight "wards", and a number of barns. The population of patients grew to 1,324.

Dr. Bass retired in 1943, and the institution went through a series of superintendents while the facility continued to expand. In 1949, the hospital began accepting African-American patients. Medical treatment was considered state-of-the-art, and the facility was self-sufficient. Mrs. May Corley, the hospital's first sociologist, said, "Everybody who lived and worked here had a job to do."

In 1957, the name of the facility was changed to Abilene State School, due to a shift in purpose to caring for people with developmental disabilities. This also allowed for the admission of children. M.J. Kelly, director for the State Board of Hospitals and Special Schools, said, "Instead of making these institutions places to retain patients, we intend to make them centers for curing patients and putting them on the road to recovery. We want all those children who can learn to receive the best of instruction." On October 31, 1963, President John F. Kennedy signed a bill providing federal aid for research, training, and rehabilitation for people with intellectual disability throughout the country, which allowed increases in staff-to-patient ratios.

== Austin State Supported Living Center ==
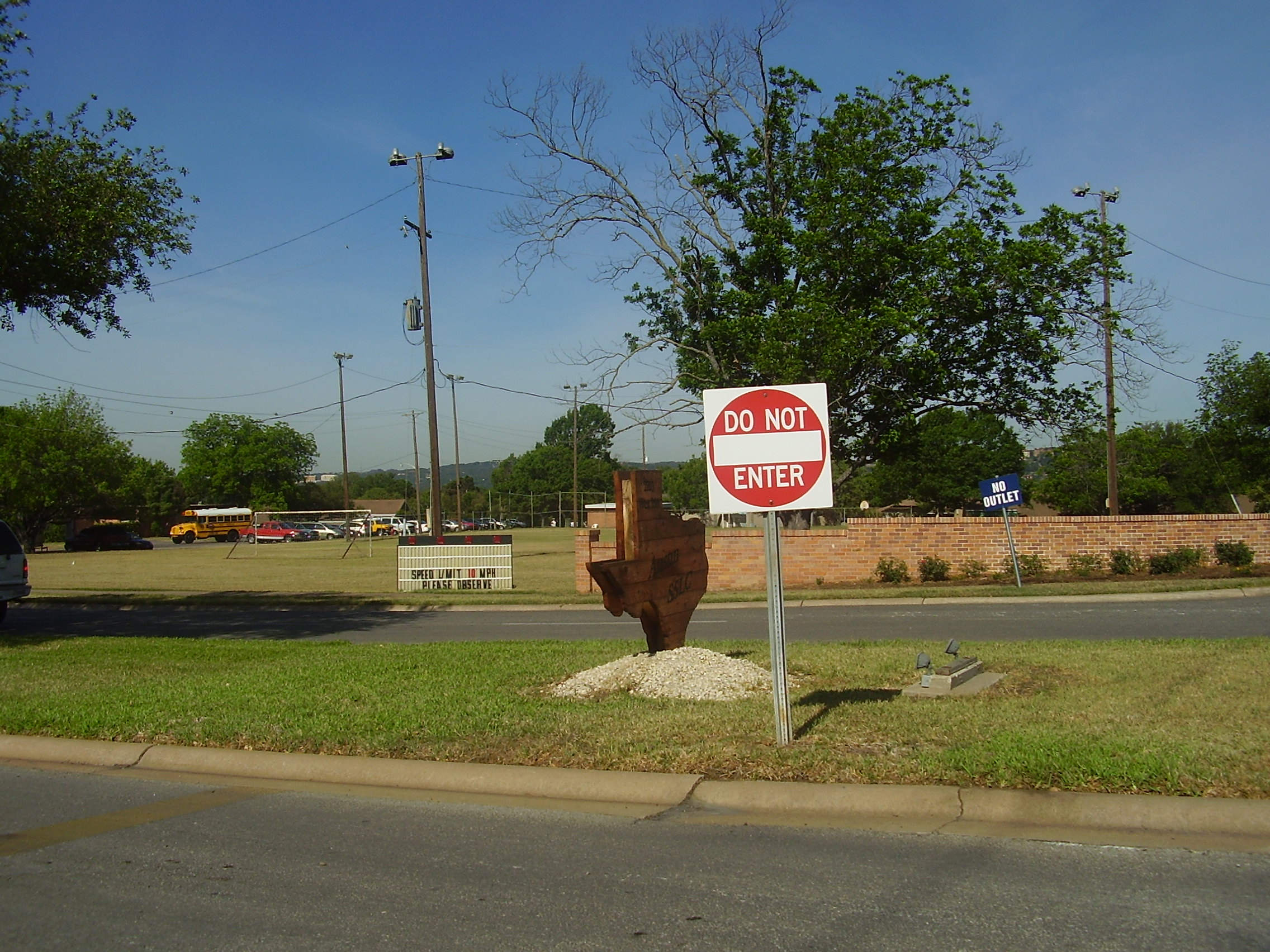
Austin State Supported Living Center (previously Austin State School)

Austin State Supported Living Center, located in Austin, is home to approximately 182 people with developmental and intellectual disabilities. The campus includes a canteen, infirmary, theater, nature trail, indoor pool, athletic field, an interfaith chapel with stained glass windows, and a guest house for visiting family members.

It was launched in 1915, when the Texas legislature passed House Bill 57, creating the State Colony for the Feebleminded, as the first facility specifically to house citizens with mental disabilities. It was renamed Austin State School in 1925. The initial census was 65 residents, mostly female. At its peak Austin State School had a census of 2,000 and included a working dairy farm.

In 1965, the Texas Mental Health and Mentally Challenged Act authorized county mentally challenged centers, with the aim of helping people with mild mental disabilities to live with their families. This caused a shift in the population of residents in State Schools to those with more profound mental challenges and multiple disabilities. By 1974, Austin State School's population had been reduced to 1,400.

In recent years, the Austin State Supported Living Center has come under scrutiny for a variety of serious health and safety violations. In 2009, a Department of Justice settlement agreement was reached in response to allegations of abuse, exploitation, and neglect.

The Austin SSLC has also had 6 immediate jeopardy findings from October 2010 to May 2013, including the death of a resident after staff failed to respond to health concerns. Residents did not bathe or have clean clothes for a week after a gas main broke. A resident was allowed to self injure until the removal of his eye was necessary by surgery.

== Brenham State Supported Living Center ==
Brenham State Supported Living Center houses approximately 400 residents in 11 residential buildings on 200 acres (0.8 km^{2}) in unincorporated Washington County, south of Brenham and between Austin and Houston. The state school serves a southeast Texas area including Brazos, Burleson, Grimes, Leon, Liberty, Madison, Montgomery, Robertson, Walker, and Washington counties. It is the largest employer in Brenham.

Brenham state school opened in January 1974, and was the first of the Texas State Schools to be certified as an ICF-MR (Intermediate Care Facility - Mentally/Intellectually Challenged).

Brenham State school features a nature area, primarily for use of residents and family members but also available on a limited basis to outside organizations and citizens. Facilities include a log cabin, picnic area, and restrooms. The campus also has a park with a picnic area and pavilion.

== Corpus Christi State Supported Living Center ==
Corpus Christi State Supported Living Center, located in western Corpus Christi, is on 104 acres (0.4 km^{2}) that was originally the city's Cliff Maus Airport.

It has 15 residential buildings serving approximately 370 residents ranging in age from 18 to 77 years. Specialized treatment units serve individuals with severe behavioral and/or emotional problems and more than 800 professionals and paraprofessionals are employed.

Corpus Christi State School opened in April 1970 as an independent school district for children with developmental disabilities. The original campus was 201 acres (0.8 km^{2}) in size.

== Denton State Supported Living Center ==
Denton State Supported Living Center, located in southeastern Denton 4 miles (6 km) south of Downtown Denton and 30 miles (50 km) north of Downtown Dallas, houses approximately 490 residents, many of whom are medically fragile and require constant medical care. Most have severe to profound intellectual and developmental disabilities and over half navigate the campus with wheelchairs or power chairs. The Denton State School employs about 1,500 staff and has a budget in excess of $44 million annually.

The campus has a central kitchen, 30-bed infirmary, canteen, cemetery, dental clinic, beauty shop, swimming pool, sheltered workshops, and central laundry. It also features one guest house and one guest apartment for visiting family members.

The Denton Chamber of Commerce learned in the late 1950s that the state was planning to build a intellectual disability facility in the Dallas–Fort Worth metroplex. Citizens donated money for the purchase of 200 acres (0.8 km^{2}) of land, and the land was donated to the state with the stipulation that it be used to provide services for people with mental intellectual challenges.

The Denton State School was established in 1960 by the legislature, and opened in July of that year. By the end of the year it was housing 1,700 residents.

== El Paso State Supported Living Center ==
Opened in 1974, the El Paso State Supported Living Center answered the community need for a long-term care facility for people with mental challenges in West Texas. The center is home to 150 people who live in eight cottages and three 16-bed units.

Located in the City of El Paso and serving El Paso County, the center employs approximately 300 people.

== Lubbock State Supported Living Center ==
Opened in June 1969, the Lubbock State Supported Living Center, located in Lubbock, serves 54 counties in the Texas Panhandle. The campus is home to approximately 310 individuals, of whom 66 percent are male and 34 percent female. The average age is 45.

The school employs approximately 790 people.

== Lufkin State Supported Living Center ==
Opened in 1962, the Lufkin State Supported Living Center is located in the heart of East Texas. The facility serves 28 counties and is home to approximately 330 people who have Intellectual Disabilities and varying degrees of disability.

The average age is 46.

Lufkin State Supported Living Center is the fourth-largest employer in Angelina County, with a workforce of approximately 1,100.

== Mexia State Supported Living Center ==
Opened in 1946, the Mexia State Supported Living Center in unincorporated Limestone County is located west of Mexia and serves 12 counties. It was the first school for persons with intellectual developmental disabilities opened outside the immediate Austin area.

The 215-acre (0.9 km^{2}) campus serves approximately 260 people. The average age is 37.

The facility includes five residential units, a gym and aquatics center, a sheltered workshop, centralized dietary services, maintenance and transportation services, laundry, canteen, sewing room, all-faith chapel, guest house and camping facilities at nearby Lake Mexia.

There are two specialized treatment units that serve individuals with severe behavioral and/or emotional mental issues.

The center employs approximately 1,400 people.

The Mexia State Supported Living Center Sunshine Group released a record titled "Dedicated to the Glory of God and to the Work and Study of Mental Retardation" in the 1970s with the cooperation of music therapist Mrs. Tom Eubanks and Superintendent Malcolm Lauderdale. A second album, "Sunshine in my Heart" was recorded and dedicated to earning money for the construction of a chapel which was eventually built. The music therapists were Miss Ada Conner and Mrs. W. B. Hammond.

Mexia State supported living center was originally the World War 2 Prisoner of War camp and some of the original Homes for that time period still remain on the campus but are used as storage units.

== Richmond State Supported Living Center ==
Opened in 1968, the Richmond State Supported Living Center is a community of more than 500 adults situated on 241 acres (1.0 km^{2}) on the banks of the Brazos River in unincorporated Fort Bend County, adjacent to and not within the city limits of Richmond.

The campus serves a 13-county area, which includes Harris County. Approximately 1,200 employees staff the facility.

A program at Richmond, the Therapeutic Riding Center, offers individuals equine and pet-assisted activities.

== Rio Grande State Supported Living Center ==
Opened in 1962, the Rio Grande State Supported Living Center in Harlingen answered the community need for a long-term care facility in the Rio Grande Valley. The center serves Cameron, Hidalgo and Wallacy counties and is home to approximately 75 people.

== San Angelo State Supported Living Center ==
Opened in 1969 as the San Angelo Center, and renamed San Angelo State School in 1983, the facility in San Angelo originally operated as a tuberculosis hospital. The campus encompasses 1,031 acres (4 km^{2}), and includes 79 buildings.

The facility serves more than 300 individuals from 38 counties and is the ninth-largest employer for the city of San Angelo, with 710 employees. There are specialized treatment units that serve individuals with severe behavioral and/or mental problems/issues.

San Angelo State School Regional Recreation Park is located across U.S. 87 from the main campus, and features wilderness cabins, a petting zoo, and a low-ropes course along the banks of the Concho River. This area provides daytime and overnight camping to state school residents, as well as recreation sites for area nonprofit, civic, and religious organizations throughout the Concho Valley.

== San Antonio State Supported Living Center ==
Opened in 1978, the San Antonio State Supported Living Center shares a 40-acre (160,000 m^{2}) campus with the San Antonio State Hospital and the Texas Center for Infectious Disease. San Antonio State School serves 10 counties surrounding Bexar County.

The school has a staff of approximately 600, and is home to 300 people with intellectual disabilities.

The average age is 45 years and the population is 59 percent male and 41 percent female.

== Former state schools ==
The State of Texas closed the Fort Worth State School in Fort Worth in 1995. The Travis State School was closed in 1999.

Since the Travis State School's closure, several buildings have been reopened. Two charters schools, KIPP and Austin Discovery School, currently utilize buildings for their respective campuses.

== See also ==
- Corsicana Residential Treatment Center – served as a state-run home for minors with intellectual disabilities from 1983–2013
