= Giddings State Juvenile Correctional Facility =

Juvenile correctional facility in Texas, USA

Coordinates: 30°10′16″N 96°53′58″W

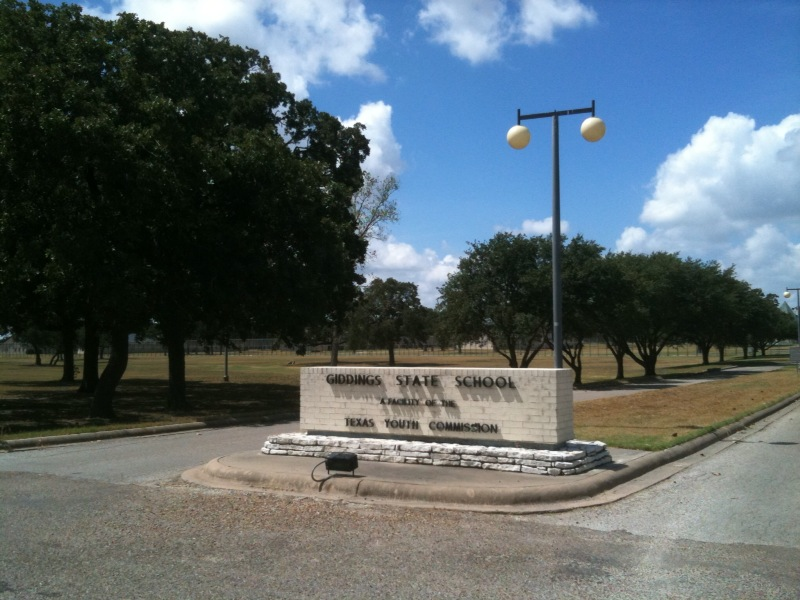
Giddings State School Entrance

Giddings State Juvenile Correctional Facility, formerly Giddings State School, is a juvenile correctional facility of the Texas Juvenile Justice Department located in unincorporated Lee County, Texas, near Giddings. In 2004, the state school was Lee County's largest employer.

== History ==
The Giddings State Home and School for Boys opened in September 1972, serving younger boys who were runaways and/or were adjudicated. In 1979 the Gatesville State School closed, and Giddings took some students previously at Gatesville. In 1980 Giddings was designated as the state's maximum security juvenile facility. In 1997 the school's students had mostly committed violent crimes.

At one time the state school had boys and girls. In 2007, the Texas Youth Commission (TYC) announced that Giddings would become male only. As of 2010 Giddings is classified as a high security facility.

In January 2012 115 inmates took a survey from Benet Magnuson, a juvenile justice analyst, and his team of researchers from the Texas Criminal Justice Coalition. Most of the prisoners reported that they felt hopeful about their futures and that they felt safe in the facility. Some stated that fights among inmates had occurred and that they had negative interactions with employees.

As of September 2015 the facility has about 200 inmates.

On Friday, September 25, 2015, 60 prisoners engaged in a fight that left three people injured.

== Location, operations and composition ==
Giddings State School is 55 miles (89 km) from Austin, and between Austin and Houston.

The 58 acres (23 ha) Giddings State School has a classroom building, a cafeteria, a chapel, vocational shops, dormitories, a gymnasium, an office complex and a security unit with individual cells. The state school has a 14-foot (430 cm) fence with motion detectors. Since 1997, guards patrol the property in unmarked vans 24 hours per day; at nighttime the guards do not use headlights so potential escapees cannot see them. John Ed Bradley of Sports Illustrated said, "People of a certain sensitivity like to call Giddings a "home" for juvenile delinquents. In truth, it's as much a pen as the one a couple of hours up the road in Huntsville, where the state keeps adult offenders." Bradley explained that the Giddings State School facility, "even in the dark before dawn, resembles a small, carefully planned college sprung up somewhere on the prairie between Austin and Houston."

The facility houses the Juvenile Capital Murderers Program.

The in-house school is Lone Star High School Southeast.

== Athletics ==
Giddings State School students may play American football. A student may join the team if he has served at least half of his sentence and is not classified as "high risk". Giddings does not have any home games, and any student classified as "high risk" is not permitted to leave campus under normal circumstances. Giddings students play when it is dark outside, because they are not able to practice after classes; the after school hours are dedicated times to meet with case workers, engage in therapy sessions and work.

In 1997, 50 of the state school's 340 students were eligible to play on the team. The team is known as the Indians. In 1997, most members of the team were African-Americans, but significant numbers of Hispanic and non-Hispanic Whites were on the team. The members originated from communities throughout Texas. John Ed Bradley of Sports Illustrated said "what makes Giddings remarkable is that its athletic program competes off campus in the Texas Association of Private and Parochial Schools (TAPPS), and it consistently wins with teams made up of some of the worst kids in the state." Because Texas state courts transfer Giddings inmates to halfway houses and Texas Department of Criminal Justice (TDCJ) adult prisons, and because some students become ineligible after committing behavior violations, the team roster may change from week to week, and the American football team often loses players in the middle of a season. In 1997, Gainesville State School, then a TYC facility for non-violent offenders, was the main rival of Giddings State School. For a 15-year period ending in 1997, Giddings never had a homecoming event. Bradley said "Who gets sentimental about returning to the place where he was locked up?" Bradley added "Giddings doesn't draw fans in droves. The families of a fair number of boys show up this evening, but they've come less to cheer for Giddings than to see their children engaged in a positive activity and wearing something other than prison-issue dungarees and T-shirts." During sports games involving Giddings, cheerleaders, fans and parents do not appear to cheer for the team.

== Controversy ==
The Giddings State School has been home to many controversies during its existence. Some children are left in isolation for up to 22 hours per day. Reports also state that suicide and self harm are also serious issues. A significant surge in self-harm incidents was observed during the COVID-19 pandemic, with an average of 11 instances per month between 2018 and January 2020. August 2020 saw the highest number of occurrences, with 91 reported cases. These issues are not unique to the Giddings State School, across all of the children under TJJDs care 45% were deemed to be suicide risks. There have also been reports of children being sexually abused by guards.

== Literature ==
The book Last Chance in Texas by John Hubner presents an in-depth look into the juvenile corrections aspect of the school.

== See also ==
- Youth incarceration in the United States
