= Texas Juvenile Probation Commission =

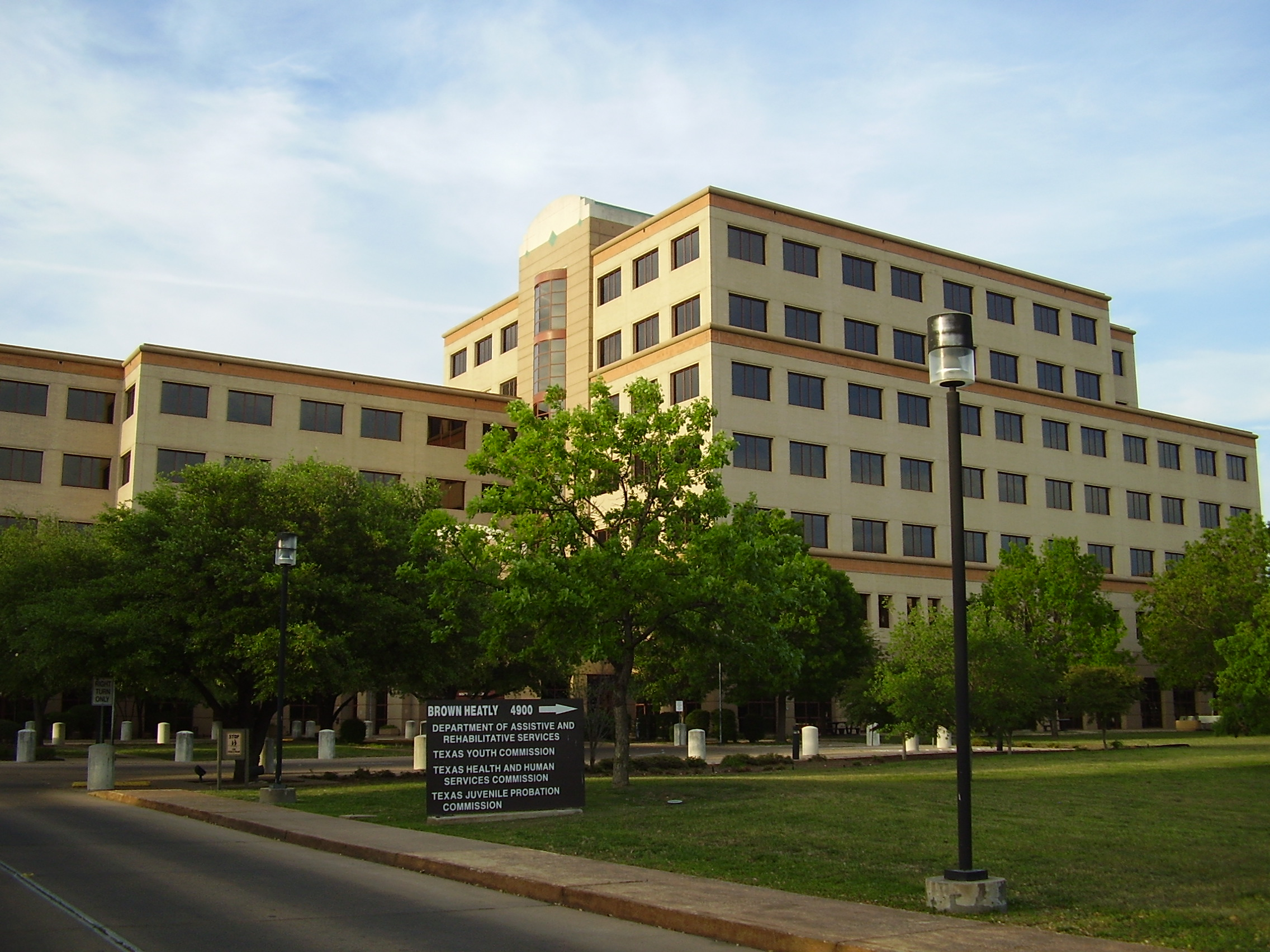
The Commission was headquartered in the Brown-Heatley Building, Austin

The Texas Juvenile Probation Commission (TJPC) was a state agency of Texas, headquartered in the Brown-Heatley Building in Austin. As of December 1, 2011, the agency was replaced by the Texas Juvenile Justice Department.

The TJPC oversaw county-operated youth detention facilities and partners with area juvenile boards and probation departments to serve youth probation services throughout Texas.

== See also ==
- Texas Youth Commission
