= Crockett State School =

Former juvenile correctional facility in Texas, United States

Coordinates: 31°17′51″N 95°28′17″W

The Crockett State School (CSS) was a Texas Youth Commission juvenile correctional facility in Crockett, Texas. The students at the state school had committed various crimes, including truancy, property crimes and crimes against persons. The Crockett State School, located on what was a 125-acre (51 ha) farm, is about 115 miles (185 km) north of Houston.

== History ==
In 1918, the Texas Federation of Colored Women's Clubs (TFCWC) began to petition the state of Texas to create a "state-sponsored home for delinquent girls" and the club would donate the land. A member of the club, Carrie Adams, was very vocal in the need to create a training school for "delinquent black girls." In 1920, the land was purchased by TFCWC. In 1927 the Texas Legislature authorized the establishment youth correctional facility for black girls by the Texas State Board of Control. However, despite the approval, no money was appropriated for the school until 1945. In 1945 the legislature provided funds to build the state school which was first called the Brady State School for Negro Girls. In August 1946 the State Board of Control entered into a lease agreement with the Federal Government of the United States so the State of Texas could use a former prisoner of war camp in McCulloch County, near Brady. In February 1947 the Brady State School for Negro Girls opened; until the opening of Brady, there were no correctional facilities that admitted black girls. In 1949 the State Youth Development Council took control of the Brady facility.

In 1950 the State of Texas moved the black girls' state school to a former farm in Houston County, near Crockett, establishing the Colored Girls Training School at Crockett. The state moved the girls so the state could cut costs and so the girls could be closer to an African-American population. In 1957 the state school was placed under the control of the Texas Youth Council (now the Texas Youth Commission). The state school was integrated in 1966, and so its name changed to Crockett State School for Girls. The juvenile facility closed in 1972. The facility, renamed to the Crockett State Home on December 13, 1973, was then used as a house and educational center for dependent and neglected children. In 1975 the youth home operations stopped, and the Crockett State School re-opened as a juvenile correctional facility for boys. In 1979 the Gatesville State School closed, and Crockett took some students previously at Gatesville.

On Monday March 16, 2009, a 14-year-old boy incarcerated in Crockett hanged himself with his underwear in his room.

On June 3, 2011, the TYC announced that the facility would close by August 31, 2011, due to budget cuts.
