= Texas Juvenile Justice Department =

State agency in Texas, United States

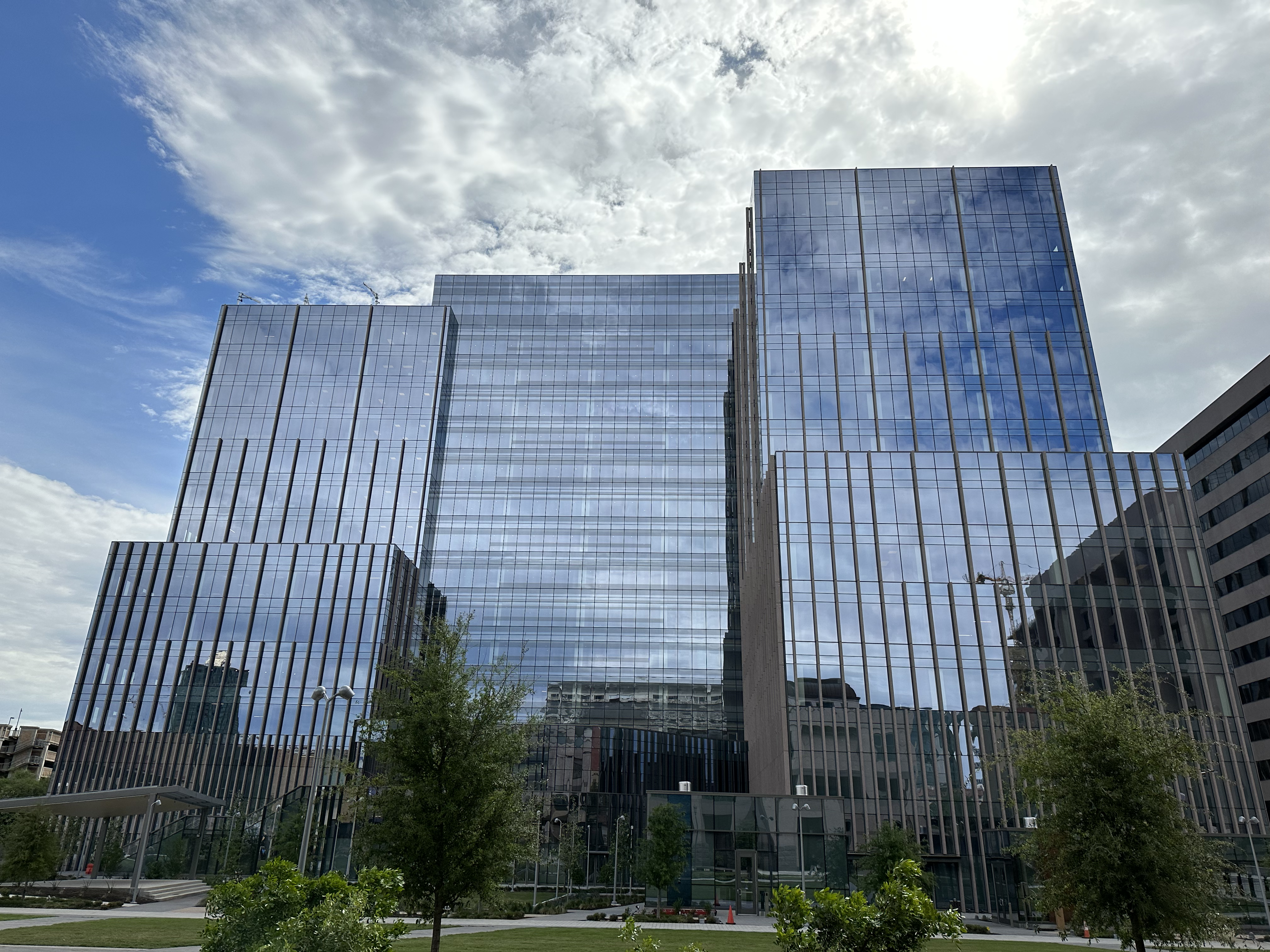
The George H. W. Bush State Office Building, which houses the TJJD headquarters

The Texas Juvenile Justice Department (TJJD) is a state agency in Texas, headquartered in the George H. W. Bush State Office Building in Austin.

It was created on December 1, 2011, replacing the Texas Youth Commission and the Texas Juvenile Probation Commission.

== History ==
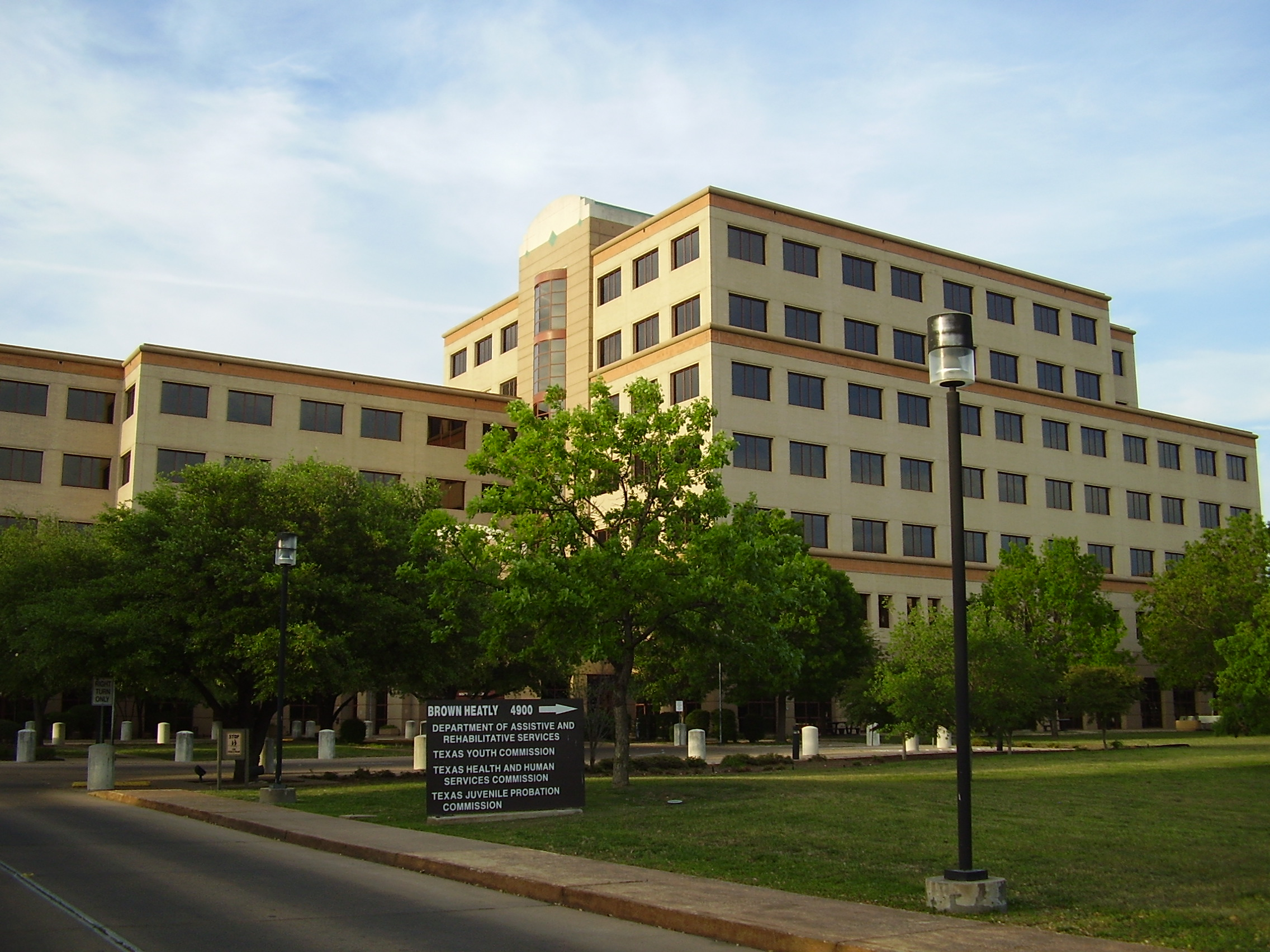
Former TJJD headquarters, Brown-Heatly Building, Austin

The implemented changes occurred after the 82nd Texas Legislature abolished the Texas Youth Commission due to the scandals surrounding this agency that was responsible from 1957 to 2011. The Texas Juvenile Justice Department was established by the legislature to manage and oversee the agencies that were abolished. There is a board that includes 11 members that are responsible for overseeing juvenile justice services from entry to the discharge of the youth; the board was selected by the Governor of Texas with Texas Senate approval.

== Criticism ==
The TJJD has gone through several iterations of major and moderate reform following scandals marked by sexual abuse and violence, including a full rebranding from the Texas Youth Commission in 2011.

In 2021, the United States Department of Justice announced that it would examine whether children detained in the Texas Juvenile Justice Department’s five lockups are reasonably protected “from physical and sexual abuse by staff and other residents, excessive use of chemical restraints and excessive use of isolation.” The investigation followed an incident reported in July when a detention officer was arrested for allegedly touching the breast of an 18-year-old detainee.

In August 2022, The Texas Tribune reported on severe understaffing in the prisons that routinely left children inside cells alone for up to 23 hours a day, forcing them to use water bottles and food trays as toilets. Almost half of the nearly 600 kids in the prisons had been on suicide watch. In response, a youth-led criminal justice reform group, Finish the 5, spent the next five months at the Texas state Capitol, urging lawmakers to close Texas’ five remaining juvenile prisons. The Finish the 5 campaign, led by the Texas Center for Justice and Equity, proposes phasing out the five prisons by 2027.

== Facilities ==
TJJD Secure Facilities

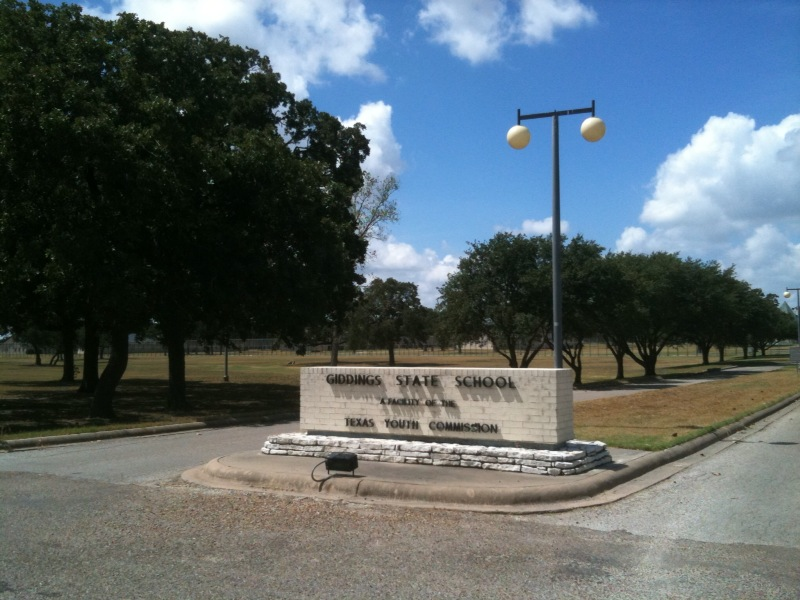
Giddings State School in unincorporated Lee County

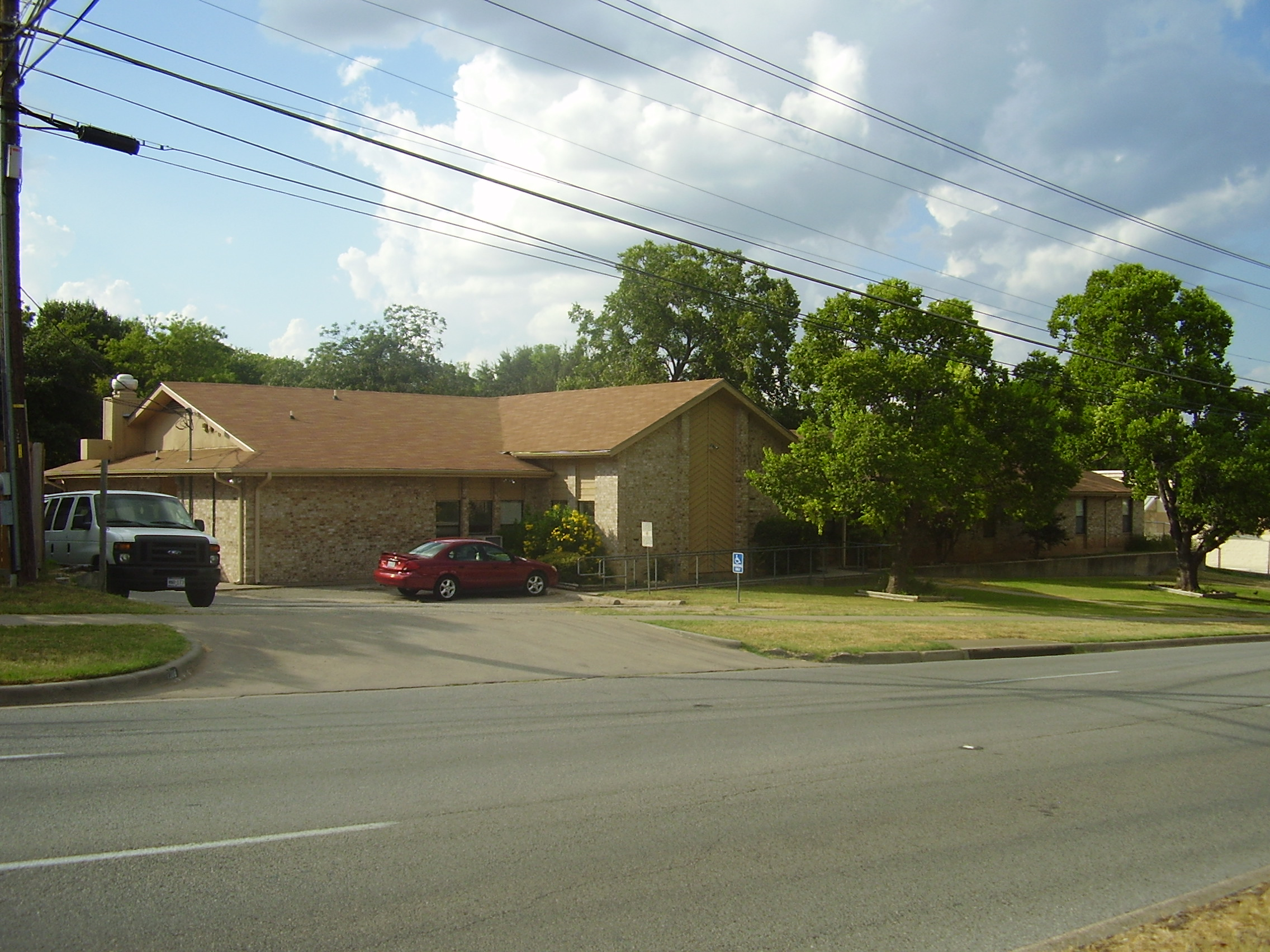
The Turman Halfway House in Austin

Juvenile offenders are court ordered to reside in Texas Juvenile Justice Department facilities. The detained individuals must be at least 10 years of age and no older than their 19th birthday. Most juvenile records are sealed as this will allow the youth to gain a second opportunity, but there are exceptions to sealing records as those individuals that commit serious crimes may be required to complete their sentence in an adult system, therefore unable to get their records sealed.

Texas Juvenile Justice Department operates and maintains institutions and halfway houses statewide. Several of the juvenile detention centers are public and privately operated facilities. Texas Juvenile Justice Department maintains records and registry of the registered facilities in operation. Detained young offenders can only be placed in detention centers that are registered by the Texas Juvenile Justice Department, under the Texas Family Code.

Registered facilities house, educate, train and rehabilitate young offenders, the treatment and programs are based on the needs of the individual within the facility. The Texas Juvenile Justice Department includes high, medium and low security facilities. A high security facility is fenced and the majority of juvenile offenders that are placed in a high security facility tend to complete their sentence in a correctional institution. The medium to low facilities are not fenced and consist of houses that the Texas Juvenile Justice Department operates or contracts with outside organizations to provide low to medium treatment for the juvenile offender.

According to the Texas Juvenile Justice Department report of 2011, the total amount of secure facilities registered include "34 post-adjudication, 31 public and 3 privately operated; 49 pre-adjudication facilities, 47 public and 2 privately operated".

Institutions:

- Evins State Juvenile Correctional Facility - Edinburg
- Gainesville State Juvenile Correctional Facility - unincorporated Cooke County
- Giddings State Juvenile Correctional Facility - unincorporated Lee County
- Ron Jackson State Juvenile Correctional Facility - Formerly Brownwood State School - partially in Brownwood
  - Serves as the admissions and orientation center for the TJJD inmates. All girls in secure residential care remain at Ron Jackson. In addition boys who are younger are in the Ron Jackson young offenders program. Most male students stay at Ron Jackson for orientation for about four to six weeks.
  - A public road separates Units I and the former Ron Jackson Unit II, which operated independently from Unit I under the Texas Youth Commission. The facility is named after former TYC director Ron Jackson.
  - Unit I houses the gateway program for females entering the TYC system. Most females in TYC remain at Ron Jackson SJCC I. Some girls may be placed in the WINGS mother-child and pregnant girl program and contract facilities. Unit I has been a female-only complex since it opened in September 1970.
- Mart State Juvenile Correctional Facility (Unit I and Unit II) - Partially in Mart, mostly inunincorporated McLennan County
  - As of 2011 units I and II were combined into one facility. The TYC governing board's original agenda had plans to close both McLennan County units, but the board changed its plans. The units are about 20 miles (32 km) south of Waco.
  - It formerly housed admissions and orientation for male TJJD inmates.

Halfway houses:

- Ayres House - San Antonio
- Schaeffer House - El Paso
- Edna Tamayo House - Harlingen

Former facilities:

- Corsicana Residential Treatment Center - Corsicana
  - The center was for youth with mental illnesses or severe emotional disturbances - Closed in 2013
- Beto House - McAllen
- Turman Halfway House - Austin
- Brownwood Halfway House - Brownwood
- Cottrell House - Dallas
- McFadden Ranch - Roanoke
- Willoughby House - Fort Worth
- York House - Corpus Christi
- Karen's House - Willis, Texas

== Programs ==
CoNEXTions CoNEXTions is an integrated, system-wide rehabilitative program offering various therapeutic techniques and tools that are used to help individual TJJD youth. The name, CoNEXTions, stems from the basic goal of the program – to prepare youth to take the NEXT step, to connect youth to healthy, law-abiding relationships with their peers, families, and communities".

Educational Programs' TJJD has year round education for incarcerated youth in each of their institutional schools. The faculty at these schools are TJJD employees. The students also participate in all state required assessments as well as the national test, Test of Adult Basic Education (TABE) The school district of the TJJD is the Lone Star School District. The following correspond with each unit:

- Central: McLennan County
- North: Gainesville
- South: Evins Regional
- Southeast: Giddings State School
- West: Ron Jackson

Workforce Development Program A program to help prepare the youth to successfully enter the workforce and maintain employment.

PAWS (Pairing Achievement With Success) In the PAWS program, TJJD youth are assigned a canine for a minimum of 12 weeks. The TJJD youth are completely responsible at all times for their dog. At the end of the 12-week program, there is an Adoption Day held where the youth helps show the dog and its new tricks to new owners looking to adopt a pet.

== Demographics ==
As of 2016, of the children under TJJD jurisdiction, including confinement in secure facilities, youth parole, contract facilities, and halfway houses, 3,925 (93.68%) were U.S. citizens and 224 (5.35%) were Mexican citizens. Other countries include Australia, Canada, Colombia, Costa Rica, Cuba, El Salvador, Guatemala, Honduras, Indonesia, Iraq, Korea, Pakistan, Russia, Venezuela, and Vietnam.

== Funding ==
TJJD gets its funding from the Texas Legislature in grant form. TJJD got its funds through the State Financial Assistance Contract that encompasses grants to each of the 164 local juvenile probation departments. Most of the funding comes from the local county government. The TJJD grants goes toward operating juvenile probation departments, juvenile detention and correctional facilities and providing basic and special services to children in the juvenile probation system. According to the TJJD's State of Juvenile Probation Activity in Texas report for calendar year 2024, county commissioners' courts contributed approximately 73% of total juvenile probation funding in fiscal year 2024, while state funds channeled primarily through TJJD accounted for the remaining 27%. In fiscal year, 2014: Border Project got a contract for $100,000.00. Commitment Reduction Program got a contract for $19,883,584.00. Family Preservation got a contract for $2,243,007.66. The Harris County Leadership Academy receives $1 million each fiscal year, as directed by rider in the Texas General Appropriations Act. The program provides a residential, cognitive-based intervention for male juveniles to redirect behavior and support their transition back to their families and communities. IV-E Contracts got a contract for $1,253,620.54. JJAEP Start-up Operations got a contract for $3,718,896.00. Mental Health got a contract for $12,783,403.29. Special Needs Diversionary got a contract for $1,974,034.00. State Aid got a contract for $108,337,312.00. Total Fiscal Year 2014 Contracts got a contract for $151,586,485.49. For fiscal years 2026 and 2027, the Texas Legislature authorized $167.1 million annually in State Aid Formula Funding (SAFF) for local juvenile probation departments, an increase of $4.1 million per year over the previous two-year appropriation cycle. The SAFF is distributed across five component grant categories mandated by the Texas General Appropriations Act: Basic Probation Supervision, Community Programs, Pre/Post Adjudication placements, Commitment Diversion, and Mental Health Services. Truancy Prevention got a contract for $292,628.00.

== Headquarters ==
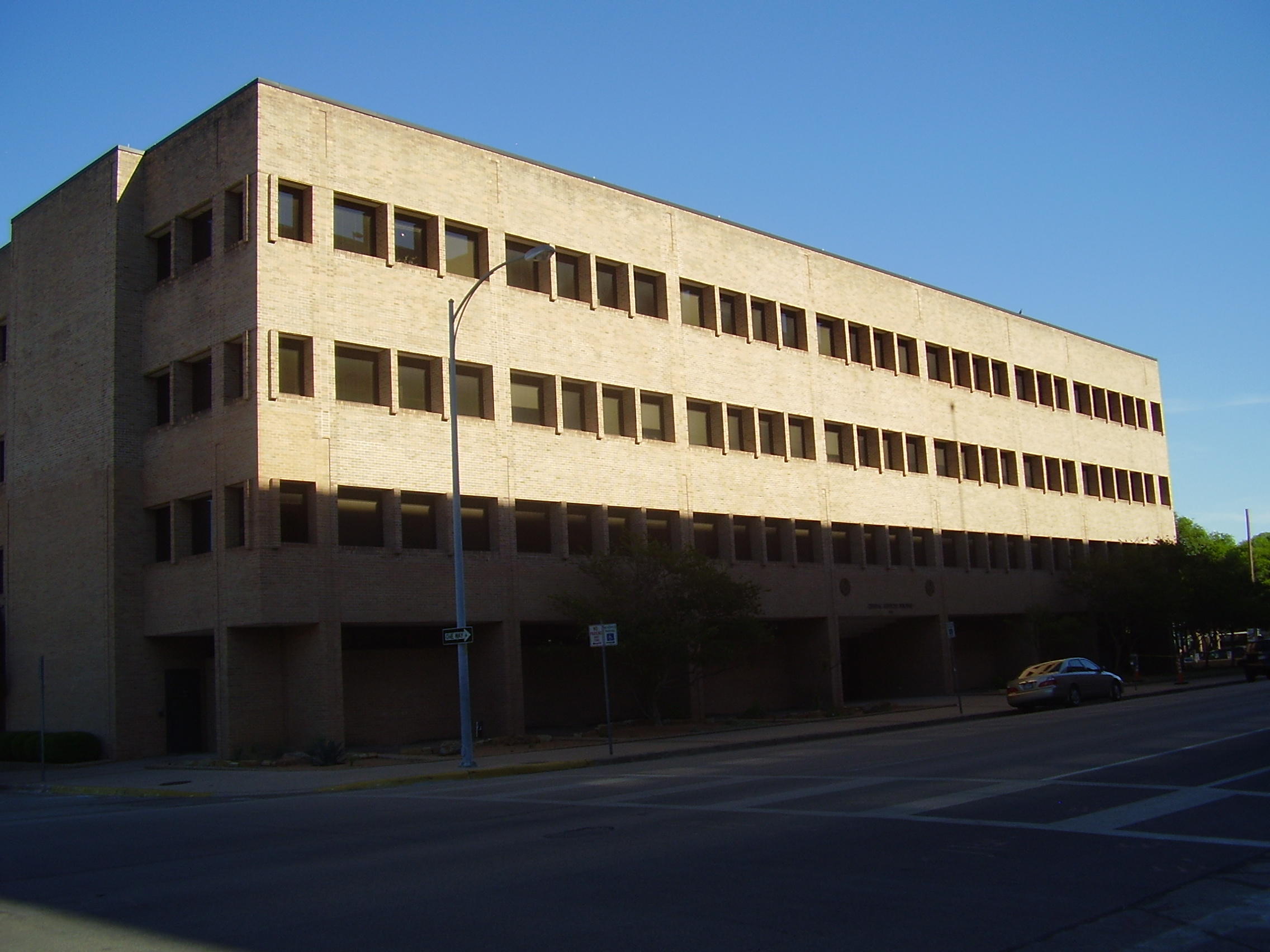
Central Services Building (CSB), the former TJJD headquarters

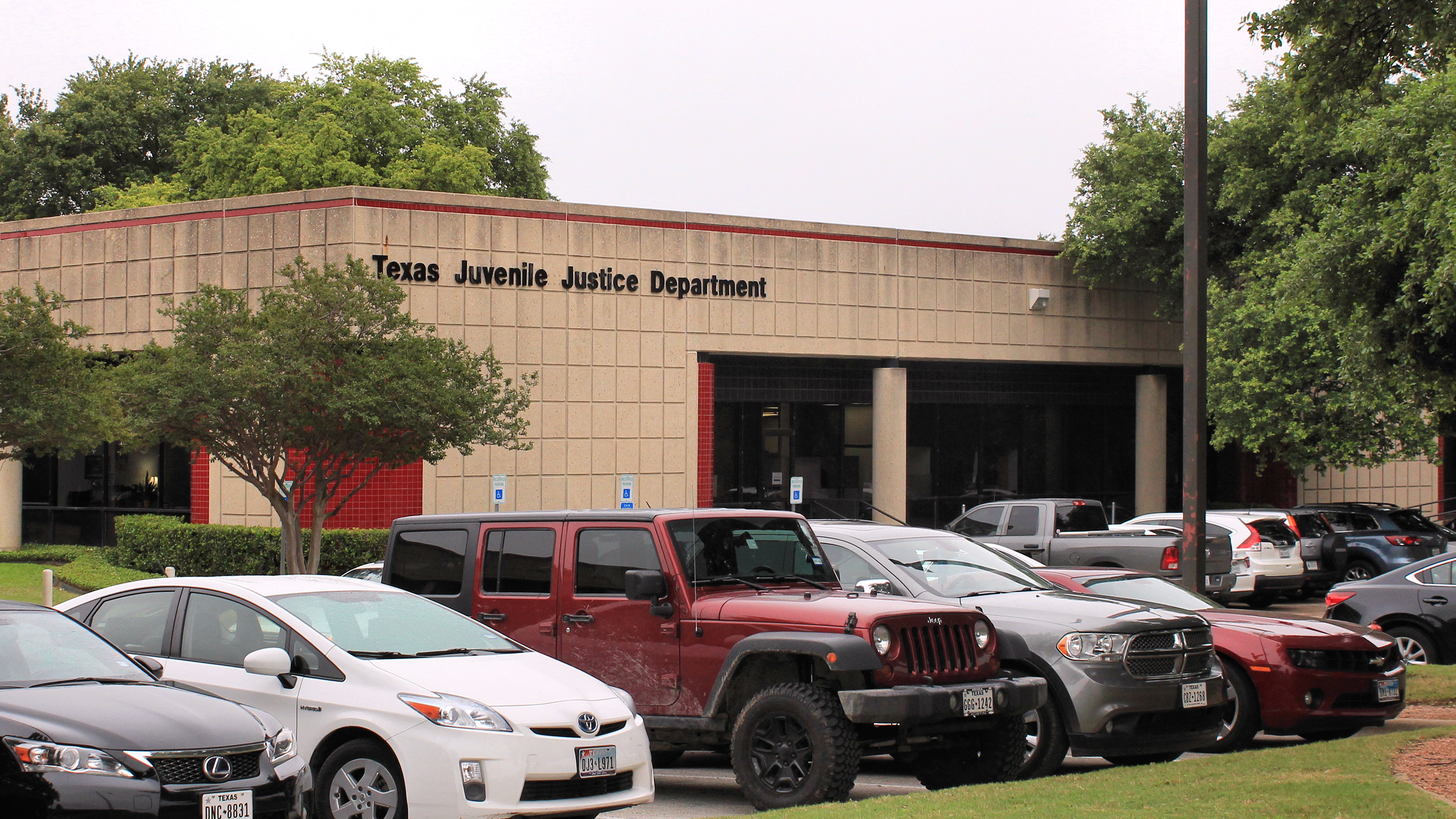
Braker H Complex, the former TJJD headquarters

The agency is headquartered in the George W. Bush State Office Building in Austin.

The TJJD was previously headquartered in the Brown-Heatly Building in Austin. Brown-Heatley, a seven story, 276,000 square feet (25,600 m^{2}), has a six story, 343,000 square feet (31,900 m^{2}) parking garage. DSG Austin provided the facility's fire alarm system.

At the end of April 2013, as part of a building space swap with the Texas Health and Human Services, the TJJD was scheduled to relocate to Braker H Complex, a 67,323-square-foot (6,254.5 m^{2}) private leased space in north Austin. It includes two loading docks, an IT training room, warehouse space, open office landscapes (OOLs), hard-wall offices, 11 conference rooms with capacities ranging from 8 to 110 persons, an employee break room, secure OIO, OIG, and IT areas, and an exterior deck. The Braker H facility had more space than the current Brown-Heatley area. The groups moving into the new facility included TJJD central office staff members previously on the second, third, and fifth floors of the Brown-Heatly building, the Office of the Independent Ombudsman, and the TJJD Austin District Parole Office.

In 2022, the TJJD moved from Braker H to the Central Services Building (CSB), which became its headquarters.
