= Corsicana Residential Treatment Center =

Former juvenile correctional facility in Texas, United States

Coordinates: 32.09312°N 96.46751°W

Originally founded in 1887 as the Texas Orphan Asylum by a bill in the Texas legislature.The Corsicana Residential Treatment Center or the Corsicana State Home was a juvenile correctional facility in Corsicana, Texas. Operated by the Texas Youth Commission (TYC), and later the Texas Juvenile Justice Department (TJJD), it housed juvenile offenders with severe mental illnesses, emotional disturbances, and developmental delays. It closed in 2013. When open, it had over 200 offenders from all over the state at varying security levels including General Offenders, Sentenced Offenders, Level A & B Violent Offenders, Firearms Offenders, Controlled Substance Dealers, and Chronic Serious Offenders.

The facility was secured by a singular 12 ft high curved top "Anti-Climb” style security fence with fine wire mesh at the top. Razor wire was omitted due to fears of youth intentionally entangling themselves in it to commit self-harm. A Gatehouse with 2 sliding security gates monitored entry in and out of the facility. Youth were housed in dormitory style buildings known as "Cottages". When open the facility consisted of a Cafeteria, Gymnasium, Infirmary, Living Quarters (Cottages), Educational Buildings, Swimming Pool, Recreation Buildings, Administrative Facilities, Segregation Unit, and Maintenance Facilities.

The facility also operated a special 14 bed unit, the CSU, or Crisis Stabilization Unit. Colocated within the same building as the facility's Infirmary, this high-security unit housed youth with particularly severe mental health issues, emotional disturbances, and those who constantly posed a serious risk of harm to themselves. While providing round-the-clock hospital level care to its residents, they would receive comprehensive psychiatric treatment, case management, educational, and therapeutic services.

The facility fell under scrutiny many times due to a number of serious instances of self-harm. The demolishing of old buildings on the land left glass and debris littered on the grounds of the facility. In turn, these objects were picked up by youth who used them to seriously harm themselves. Many of these injuries would require serious medical care outside of the facility. Shortly before closing, a June 2013 TJJD report stated that: The facility, “continues to pose a risk to the vulnerable youth population it serves as hazardous debris and glass are continually unearthed after rain or strong winds.” It was eventually closed for good in December 2013.

The TJJD board, in 2016, rejected a plan which would have converted the facility into an immigration detention center for youth; the City of Corsicana had signed an agreement with Cayuga Home for Children to obtain the title for the facility for free, house illegal immigrant minors there, and rent it to Cayuga for a monthly fee of $3,000.
