= Gainesville State Juvenile Correctional Facility =

Juvenile correctional facility in Texas, United States

Coordinates: 33°37′33″N 97°05′26″W

The Gainesville State Juvenile Correctional Facility, formerly Gainesville State School, is a juvenile correctional facility of the Texas Juvenile Justice Department in unincorporated Cooke County, Texas, near Gainesville. The fenced, maximum security state school is located on a 160-acre (65 ha) tract east of Gainesville, 75 miles (121 km) north of Dallas, along Farm to Market Road 678 and near Interstate 35. Gainesville is a maximum security facility and is fenced. As of 2012 it is the largest juvenile correctional facility in Texas. As of 2012 it houses 270 teenagers. Many of them are 17 and 18 years old.

== History ==
The facility, originally the Texas State Training School for Girls, was established in 1913 and opened in September 1916. The 33rd Texas Legislature authorized the establishment of the state school and dedicated $35,000 to its construction. In 1948 the state school was renamed the Gainesville State School for Girls. The state school's size increased from 100 acres (40 ha) to 160 acres (0.65 km^{2}). The 55th Texas Legislature transferred the Gainesville State School to the Texas Youth Council (now Texas Youth Commission) from the Texas Board of Control. In 1974 the school became a coeducational juvenile correctional facility. In 1979 the Gatesville State School closed, and Gainesville took some students previously at Gatesville. In 1988 the facility began to only house boys. In 1997 Gainesville was a TYC facility for nonviolent offenders.

On October 8, 2012 a group of boys gained access to two security panels. They unlocked several doors, climbed on rooftops, and broke windows, causing thousands of dollars in damages. Pepper spray was used to bring the situation to an end.

== Education ==
The school program is Lone Star High School North.

== Athletics ==
The school has an American football sports team, the Tornadoes, which accepts low-risk juvenile delinquents. The team uses old equipment. Of the players, many had convictions for assault, drugs, and robbery. Some team members had families who had disowned them.

In 1997 Gainesville's main rival was Giddings State School. In one game about half of the members of the community of the Faith Christian School in Grapevine, Texas were placed on the Gainesville side to cheer for Gainesville. Kris Hogan, the head coach of Faith, had created the idea.

== Artwork ==
The facility includes the Gainesville State School Fine Arts Academy. In 1999 the state school received a two year, $198,000 grant from the Office of Juvenile Justice and Delinquency Prevention of the United States Department of Justice so the juvenile detention center could provide art instruction to state school students.

Gainesville State School students Orlando Contreras and Felipe O'Campo, under the supervision of professional artist Tina Blytas, created a multicultural mural posted within the state school facility. The mural depicts the Statue of Liberty, an Aztec calendar, a leopard symbolizing Africa, and chained hands breaking free that represent the emancipation of slaves. The people depicted in the mural include Bessie Coleman, John F. Kennedy, Martin Luther King Jr., Selena, and Emiliano Zapata. The bottom of the mural depicts the six flags over Texas.

In addition Gainesville students, under the direction of Judy Peele, the fine arts coordinator, created a Hispanic Culture Mural to depict Hispanic culture in the past and present. The mural includes an Aztec warrior in ceremonial headdress, Emiliano Zapata, and "El Castillo," a temple representing the architecture of the Aztecs.
