= Texas Youth Commission =

Texan state agency

The Texas Youth Commission (TYC) was a Texas state agency which operated juvenile corrections facilities in the state. The commission was headquartered in the Brown-Heatly Building in Austin. As of 2007, it was the second largest juvenile corrections agency in the United States, after the Florida Department of Juvenile Justice. As of December 1, 2011, the agency was replaced by the Texas Juvenile Justice Department.

== History ==
The Gilmer-Aikin Laws in 1949 established the Texas Youth Development Council. In 1957 the state reorganized the agencies, placing the juvenile corrections system and homes for dependent and neglected children into the Texas Youth Council. In 1983 the Texas Legislature gave the agency its current name, the Texas Youth Commission.

In September 2008 the TYC had 2,200 inmates, half the number it had 18 months previously.

On June 3, 2011, the TYC announced that it was closing three facilities by August 31, 2011, affecting 700 employees and 400 prisoners, due to state budget cuts. The governing board selected the three facilities that would close. After the closings the TYC will have six secure facilities remaining.

On December 1, 2011, the Texas Juvenile Justice Department was formed, replacing TYC and the Texas Juvenile Probation Commission.

=== Child sexual abuse scandal ===
On 23 February 2007, The Texas Observer published a news story detailing allegations of child sexual abuse by staff members at the West Texas State School near Pyote. Following an investigation by the Texas Rangers and the FBI in February and March 2005, two of the highest-ranking officials at the school, assistant superintendent Ray Brookins and principal John Paul Hernandez had been accused of having sexual relations with several students over an extended period. On February 28 Republican Governor Rick Perry dismissed chairman Pete C. Alfaro, who had been named to the commission in 1995 by then Republican governor George W. Bush, and called for the dismissal of acting executive director Neil Nichols.

On March 2, more allegations surfaced of sexual abuse at the Ron Jackson State Juvenile Correctional Facility in Brownwood, leaving McAllen Democrat Juan Hinojosa to state that the situation at Pyote "is not an isolated incident." The same day, the Austin American-Statesman reported its possession of an internal report on the sexual abuse misconduct investigations, with four extra paragraphs that were redacted in the final public version detailing involvement of several top officials in 2005. Also on the same day, Gov. Rick Perry appointed Jay Kimbrough as "Special Master".

As the scandal gained public attention, more allegations were uncovered. The TYC admitted that at least 10 teenage boys were victimized at the West Texas State School, and newspapers reported on some 750 complaints of sexual misconduct against correctional officers and other TYC employees since January 2000. TYC Inspector General Ray Worsham was later implicated in the alteration of the misconduct investigations report. On 28 March, Gov. Perry appointed Kimbrough conservator of the TYC.

=== ACLU lawsuit ===
On 13 June 2008, the American Civil Liberties Union filed a class action lawsuit, K.C. v. Nedelkoff, against the TYC on behalf of five girls and "all girls and young women who are now or in the future will be confined in Brownwood State School". The ACLU charged that girls were "regularly placed in punitive solitary confinement," that "[u]pon entering or exiting solitary confinement and on other occasions when they have not left the facility - for example, when they finish a work assignment within the prison - girls are subject to invasive strip searches. When girls resist, guards regularly use physical force, pepper spray, handcuffs and leather straps to force them to comply," and that the "treatment the girls have suffered violates their constitutional rights under the Fourth, Fifth, Eighth, and Fourteenth Amendments" as well as articles 3, 19, 23, 34, 37, and 39 of the Convention on the Rights of the Child and articles 7 and 10 of the International Covenant on Civil and Political Rights.

In an official press release, Conservator Nedelkoff responded to the lawsuit saying he was "disappointed" and that he "look[s] forward to working with the ACLU, along with our Texas advocacy partners, to address all concerns mentioned in this lawsuit," and Ombudsman Will Harrell stated that he was also "disappointed" and that "most of the allegations mentioned are being addressed." Deputy Commissioner for Programs and Treatment Dianne Gadow, ultimately responsible for Youth Rights, made no comment on the matter.

== Operations ==
In Texas a juvenile offender is a person who is at least 10 years of age but has not yet turned 17 while committing an act referred to as "delinquent conduct" (an act that, if committed by an adult, would result in confinement in a jail or imprisonment) or "conduct in need of supervision" or a "CINS violation" (an act that refers to conduct that, if committed by an adult, would result in a fine, or conduct that may only be committed by children such as truancy). If a juvenile received an "adjudication," it is a finding that the juvenile committed "delinquent conduct" or a "CINS violation," equivalent to a conviction in an adult court system. Among the possible outcomes for youth adjudicated for "delinquent conduct" is being sent to a TYC institution.

Juvenile court judges sentence youth offenders to the custody of the TYC. Juveniles in TYC can be classified as either General Offenders, Level A or B Violent Offenders, Firearms Offenders, Controlled Substance Dealers, or Chronic Serious Offenders. They either receive a determinate or indeterminate sentence. Most offenders receive indeterminate sentences, meaning there is no set end date to the sentences. The commission defines a minimum stay or period of confinement, between 9 and 24 months, (known as a minimum length of stay or MLOS) or (Minimum Period of Confinement or MPOC) for each offender with an indeterminate sentence, and the prisoner may be released from custody depending on his or her participation in the program. The child may stay in TYC custody until reaching 19 years of age. Some courts set specific sentences for TYC offenders; the sentences may be up to 40 years. If TYC officials determine that the offender satisfactorily completed the TYC program while in TYC custody, the offender may serve the rest of his or her court-defined sentence while on adult parole instead of serving time in a Texas Department of Criminal Justice (TDCJ) adult prison. A child committed to the TYC system on or before June 7, 2007, may be held by the agency until the age of 21. Offenders with determinate sentences occupy about 20% of the slots at high restriction facilities.

Upon admittance to the TYC system, offenders undergo orientation and are placed in assessment units before being sent to their final assignments. Boys are sent to the McLennan County State Juvenile Correctional Facility in unincorporated McLennan County, near Mart. Girls are sent to the Ron Jackson State Juvenile Correctional Complex in Brownwood. The Marlin Orientation and Assessment Unit, located in Marlin, served as the place of orientation for children of both sexes being committed into TYC from the facility's opening in 1995 to its transfer out of TYC in 2007. In the 1960s TYC's reception center for boys was in Gatesville and its reception center for girls was in Brownwood.

TYC offenders may use the internet while working on certain projects for school; they are never allowed to access e-mail accounts and social networking sites like Facebook, MySpace, and Twitter.

== Demographics of offenders ==
In the fiscal year of 2009, of the children incarcerated at TYC facilities, 48% of new arrivals had committed violent offenses. Of the population, 91% were male and 9% were female. 45% were Hispanic, 40% were African-American, and 20% were White. According to the TYC, 43% of the inmates admitted to being members of gangs during intake. 16 was the median age of commitment.

As of 2010 of the children with known citizenships who were in secure facilities, in halfway houses, in contract programs, and on parole, 3,925 (93.68%) were Citizens of the United States. 224 (5.35%) were citizens of Mexico. Other countries represented included Australia, Canada, Colombia, Costa Rica, Cuba, El Salvador, Guatemala, Honduras, Indonesia, Iraq, South Korea, Pakistan, Russia, Venezuela, and Vietnam.

== Facilities ==
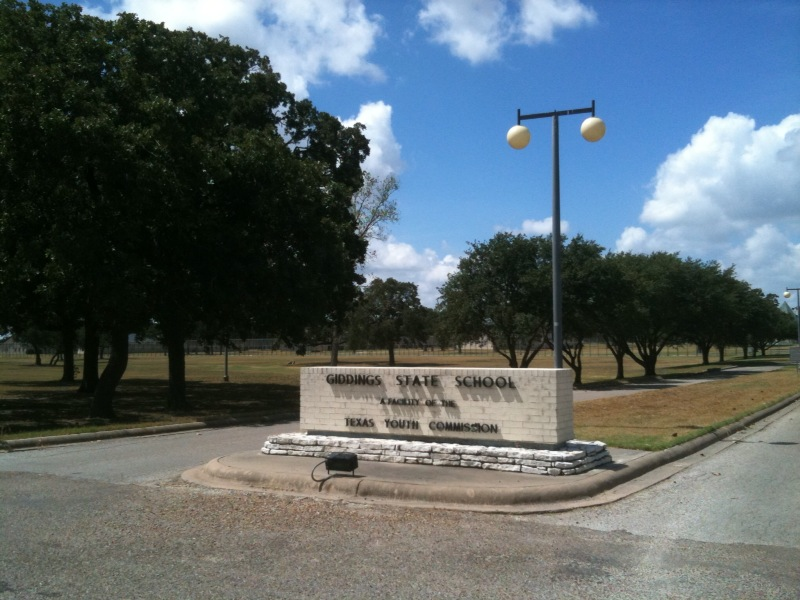
Giddings State School in unincorporated Lee County

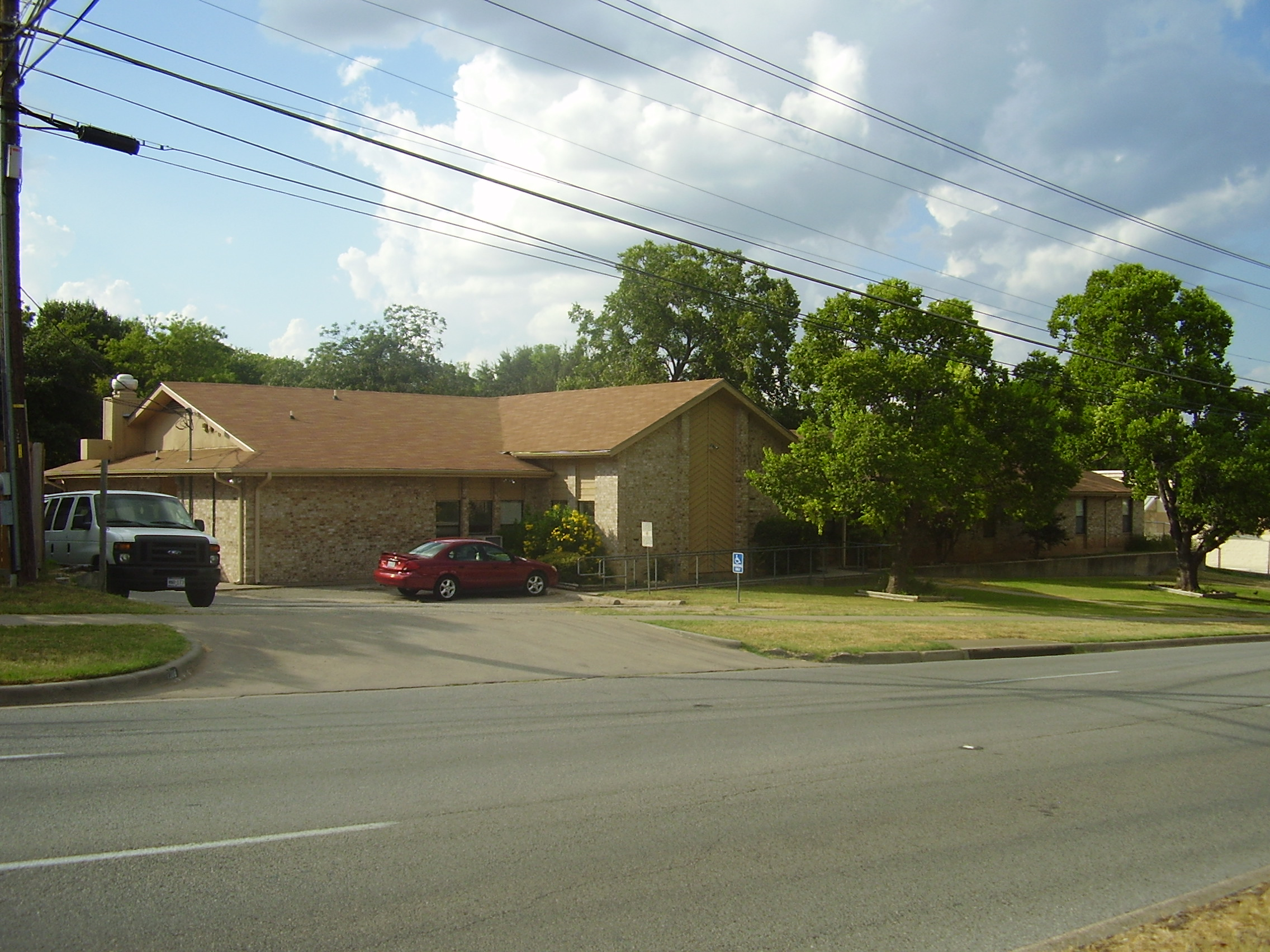
The Turman Halfway House in Austin

At the time of its closure, the TYC operated correctional institutions and halfway houses.

Institutions:

- Corsicana Residential Treatment Center - Corsicana
  - The center was for youth with mental illnesses or severe emotional disturbances
- Evins Regional Juvenile Center - unincorporated Hidalgo County
- Gainesville State School - unincorporated Cooke County
- Giddings State School - unincorporated Lee County
- Ron Jackson State Juvenile Correctional Complex (Unit I) - Formerly Brownwood State School - Brownwood
  - A public road separates Units I and the former II, which operated independently from Unit I. The facility is named after former TYC director Ron Jackson. The renaming ceremony was held in Unit II on Tuesday, September 16, 2003. Ron Jackson II closed by August 31, 2011.
  - Unit I houses the gateway program for females entering the TYC system. Most females in TYC remain at Ron Jackson SJCC I. Some girls may be placed in the WINGS mother-child and pregnant girl program and contract facilities. Unit I has been a female-only complex since it opened in September 1970.
  - Unit II was for male offenders who violated the terms of their juvenile paroles. In May 1970 Unit II opened as a reception center for girls. In 2007 TYC announced that it planned to convert Unit II into a female unit to avoid complications between boys and girls.
- McLennan County State Juvenile Correctional Facility (Unit I and Unit II) - unincorporated McLennan County, near Mart
  - As of 2011 units I and II were combined into one facility. The TYC governing board's original agenda had plans to close both McLennan County units, but the board changed its plans. The units are about 20 miles (32 km) south of Waco.

Halfway houses:

- Ayres House
- Beto House
- Cottrell House
- McFadden Ranch
- Schaeffer House
- Edna Tamayo House
- Turman House
- Willoughby House
- York House

== Former facilities ==
In 1974 federal judge William Wayne Justice ruled on Morales v. Turman. He ordered the Texas Youth Council to close the Gatesville State School and the Mountain View State School and to redesign the agency's juvenile corrections system. The Mountain View school closed in 1975, and the Gatesville school closed in 1979.

The Sheffield Boot Camp, which opened in 1995, closed on March 31, 2008. The West Texas State School in unincorporated Ward County closed in 2010. The West Texas State School and the Victory Field Correctional Academy in unincorporated Wilbarger County will officially close by August 31, 2010.

The following former TYC facilities were transferred to the Texas Department of Criminal Justice (TDCJ):

- J.W. Hamilton Jr. State School (Bryan) - Opened in 1997, transferred on June 15, 2003, now the Hamilton Unit.
  - Hamilton was originally an adult prison facility. It was renovated for juveniles and reopened in mid-1997.
- Marlin Orientation & Assessment Unit (Marlin) - Opened in 1995, transferred on August 31, 2007, now the Marlin Unit.
- John Shero State Juvenile Correctional Facility, formerly San Saba State School (unincorporated San Saba County) - Opened in 1996, transferred on August 31, 2007, now the San Saba Unit.

The Coke County Juvenile Justice Center, located in unincorporated Coke County, south of Bronte, was a 200-bed secure facility operated by the GEO Group (formerly Wackenhut Corrections Corp.) and contracted by the TYC. Originally designed for girls, it was changed into an all boy facility in 1998. In 2006, 19-year-old Robert Schulze, an inmate incarcerated at Coke who had earlier said that he felt unsafe at the facility, hanged himself in his cell. In 2007, after the TYC inspected the facility, the TYC moved the approximately 200 youth it contracted to the center out of the Coke County facility and caused it to close. During the life of the Coke County facility, Wackenhut received criticism from the media for how it operated the center.

The following closed in 2011:

- Crockett State School - Crockett
  - Was to be closed by August 31, 2011
- Ron Jackson State Juvenile Correctional Complex Unit II - Formerly Brownwood State School Unit II - Brownwood
- Al Price State Juvenile Correctional Facility - unincorporated Jefferson County, in the Mid County area.
  - Originally the Jefferson County State School (JCSS), Al Price opened in August 1995, with the first 14 delinquents arriving on the 14th of that month. The second phase was completed in March 1997. The state school received its current name on October 5, 2001. Joe Deshotel, a state representative from Beaumont, proposed renaming the facility after former Texas politician Al Price. Price will close by August 31, 2011. When it closed, it had 130 prisoners and 270 employees.
  - Al Price was the closest juvenile correctional facility to the City of Houston.

== Contract placements ==
As of 2010 the Texas Youth Commission contracted with 12 third party facilities for contract placement:

- Abraxas Youth and Family Services (San Antonio)
- Alliance Children's Services E.A. Intermediate (Houston)
- Alliance Children's Services S.O. Intermediate (Austin)
- Associated Marine Institutes (unincorporated Cameron County)
- Brookhaven Youth Ranch (unincorporated McLennan County)
- Byrds Therapeutic Youth Home (Houston)
- Garza County of Juvenile Center (Post)
- Gulf Coast Trades Center (unincorporated Walker County)
- Mel Matthews Vocational Center (Cisco)
- Southwest Key West(Houston)
- Specialized Alternatives for Youth (SAFY) (Arlington)
- Women In Need of Greater Strengths (WINGS) for Life (unincorporated Guadalupe County, near Marion)

== Special programs ==
The TYC includes the Mother-Baby Program, which cares for teenage mothers and their children. The 76th Texas Legislature passed the Senate Bill 1607, a bill written by state senator John Whitmire and co-sponsored by state representative Ray Allen, in 1999, establishing the Mother-Baby Program. The Women In Need of Greater Strengths (WINGS) program is located near Marion, north of San Antonio. The facilities can house 14 mothers and their children.

Girls at the Ron Jackson youth facility may participate in the Pairing Achievement With Service (PAWS) program; in the program girls take care of dogs from local animal shelters. The girls research the dog breeds and write autobiographies and community success plans for their dogs.

== Headquarters ==
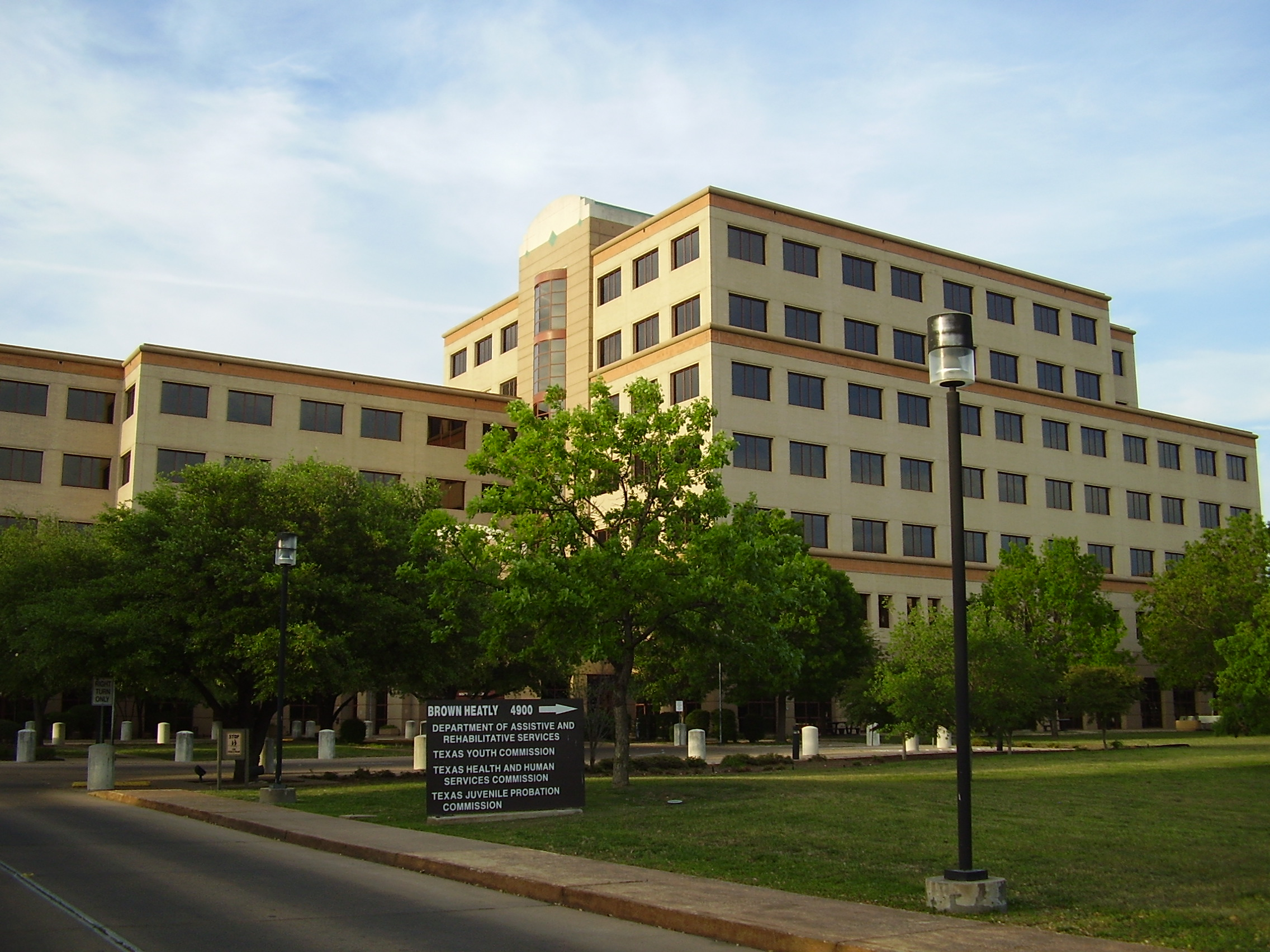
TYC headquarters, Brown-Heatly Building, Austin

The Texas Youth Commission is headquartered in the Brown-Heatly Building in Austin. Brown-Heatley, a seven-story, 276,000 square feet (25,600 m^{2}), has a six-story, 343,000 square feet (31,900 m^{2}) parking garage. Brown-Heatley, in addition to being the headquarters of TYC, also serves as the headquarters of another state agency.

== See also ==
- Texas Juvenile Probation Commission
- Youth incarceration in the United States
